= Borgo Panigale =

District of Bologna, Italy

- Borgo Panigale Neighborhood
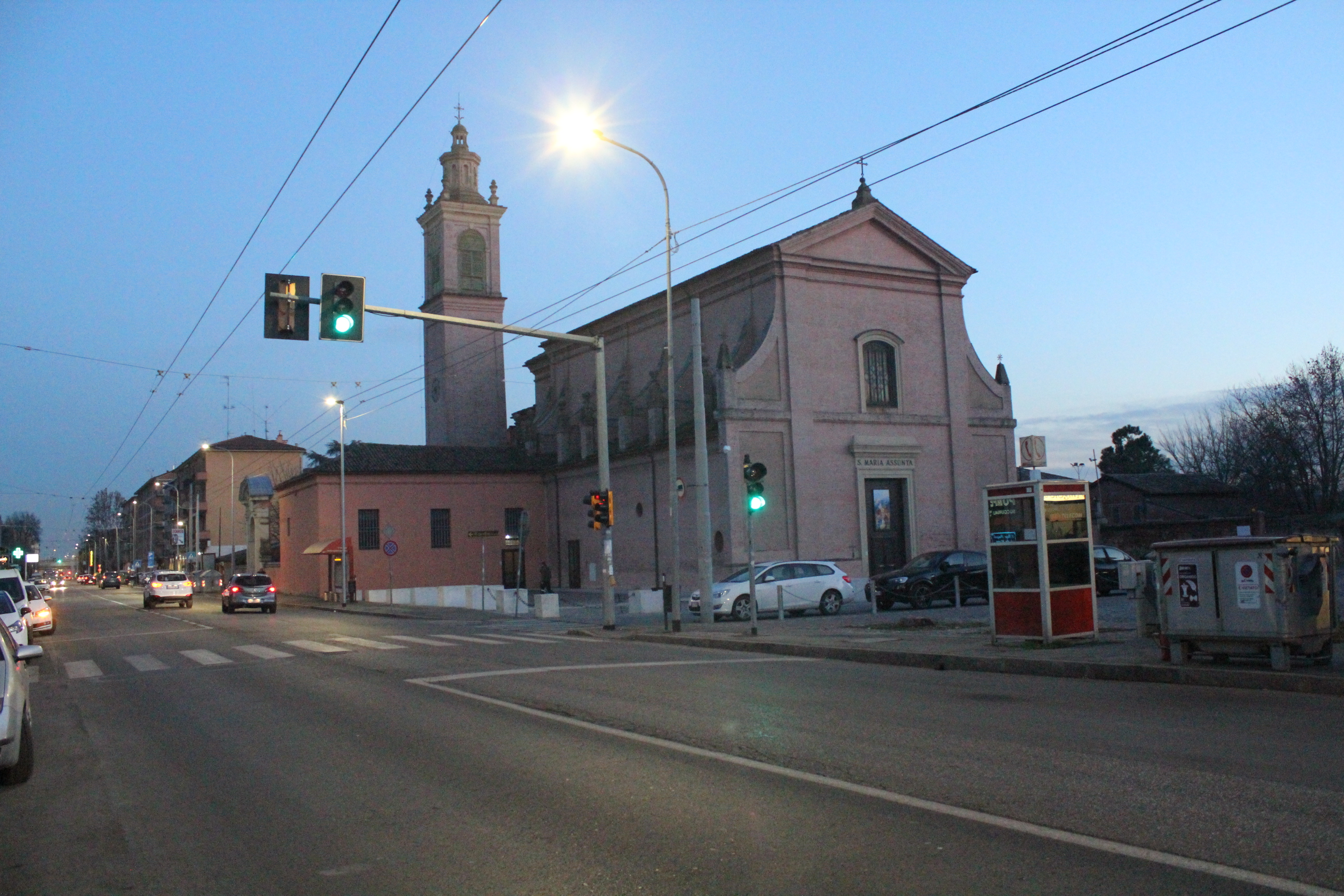
- The parish church of Santa Maria Assunta
- Interactive map of Borgo Panigale
- Coordinates: 44.5177°N 11.2744°E
- Neighborhood: Borgo Panigale-Reno
- Country: Italy
- Region: Emilia-Romagna
- Province: Metropolitan City of Bologna
- City: Bologna
- Established: 1962

Area
  - Total: 22.9 km^{2} (8.8 sq mi)

Population
  - Total: 26,610 (2,023)

Borgo Panigale (Al Båurg or Båurg Panighèl in Bolognese dialect) is a district of Bologna, Italy.

An independent municipality until December 1937, when it was incorporated into the city, it has been part of the Borgo Panigale-Reno neighborhood since the administrative reform of 2016, alongside the adjacent areas of Barca and Santa Viola.

The neighborhood is home to Bologna's airport (Bologna Guglielmo Marconi Airport) and the industrial facilities of the motorcycle manufacturer Ducati.

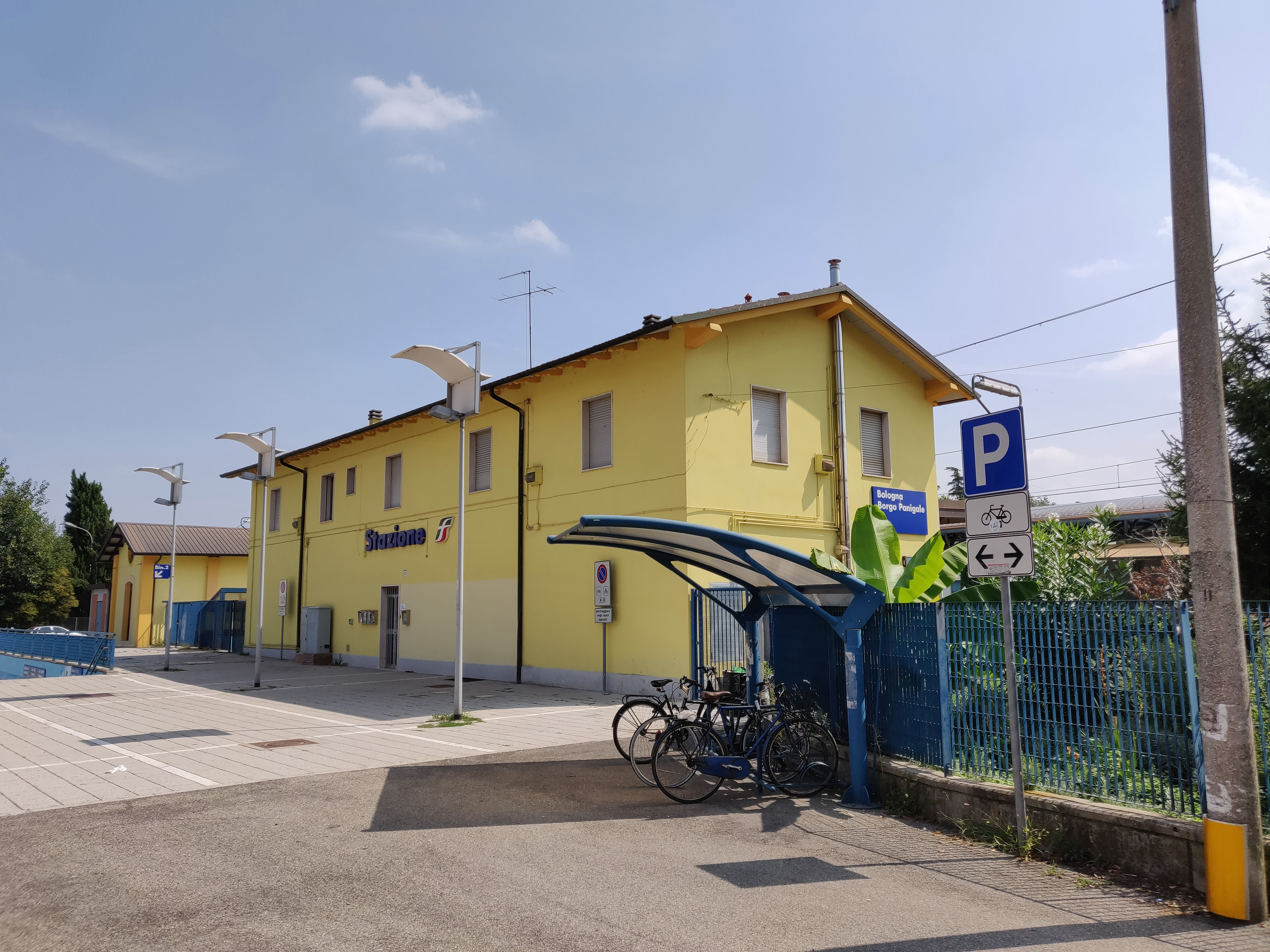
Borgo Panigale railway station

== Geography ==
=== Territory ===
The neighborhood's boundaries are defined by the Reno and Lavino rivers to the west and east, respectively, the city's airport to the north, and the Via Caduti di Casteldebole road to the south, which separates it from the neighboring municipality of Casalecchio di Reno. Once a center with an agricultural focus, the neighborhood is now primarily residential and industrial.

== History ==
=== Prehistory ===
==== Stone Age ====
Evidence of a village dating back to the Mesolithic period was uncovered during excavations at the Due Portoni site between 1983 and 1984.

==== Bronze Age ====
Artifacts, including ceramic, bronze, and gold fragments, were discovered at the Sant'Agnese site during excavations beginning in 1950.

=== Ancient history ===
==== Etruscan period ====
Numerous Etruscan-era tombs were found at the Bassi excavations in the early 20th century.

==== Roman period ====
When the Romans defeated the Boii, they named the new colony Bononia. The urban layout of the city dates to 189 BC, predating the construction of the Via Aemilia in 187 BC. Even then, the Borgo Panigale area had a mixed character, serving residential, productive, artisanal, and commercial purposes.

In 42 BC, the Second Triumvirate met on an island in the Reno River to restore unity and peace to Rome. The road along the left bank of the Reno River, named "Via del Triumvirato," commemorates this event.

Roman generals assigned conquered lands to their former legionaries, who established the settlements of Vicus Panicalis and Vicus Olmetolae, the two oldest vici in Borgo Panigale.

=== Medieval history ===
The city was surrounded by villages known as vici. Documents from the 8th and 9th centuries mention the Vicus Panicalis (or Panicale). Due to its strategic location and direct connection to Bologna via the bridge over the Reno River, it quickly gained prominence, becoming known as Burgus Panicalis (a name used before 1117), later called Borgo Panigale. This village was involved in all historical events that unfolded along the Via Aemilia.

The area between the Reno and Lavino rivers was marshy due to frequent flooding. It was reclaimed and equipped with canals, enhancing its reputation as fertile land. The main crops were minor cereals, particularly panicum, similar to millet, well-suited for cultivation in very humid environments.

Ears of panicum appear in an ancient decoration inside the Santa Maria Assunta church in Borgo Panigale. Three ears of panicum later became the symbol of the municipality and the neighborhood.

=== Modern history ===
During this period, four communities existed:

- Borgo Panigale
- Medola
- Spirito Santo
- Rigosa

This division into communities was likely intended for tax collection purposes at the time.

=== Contemporary history ===
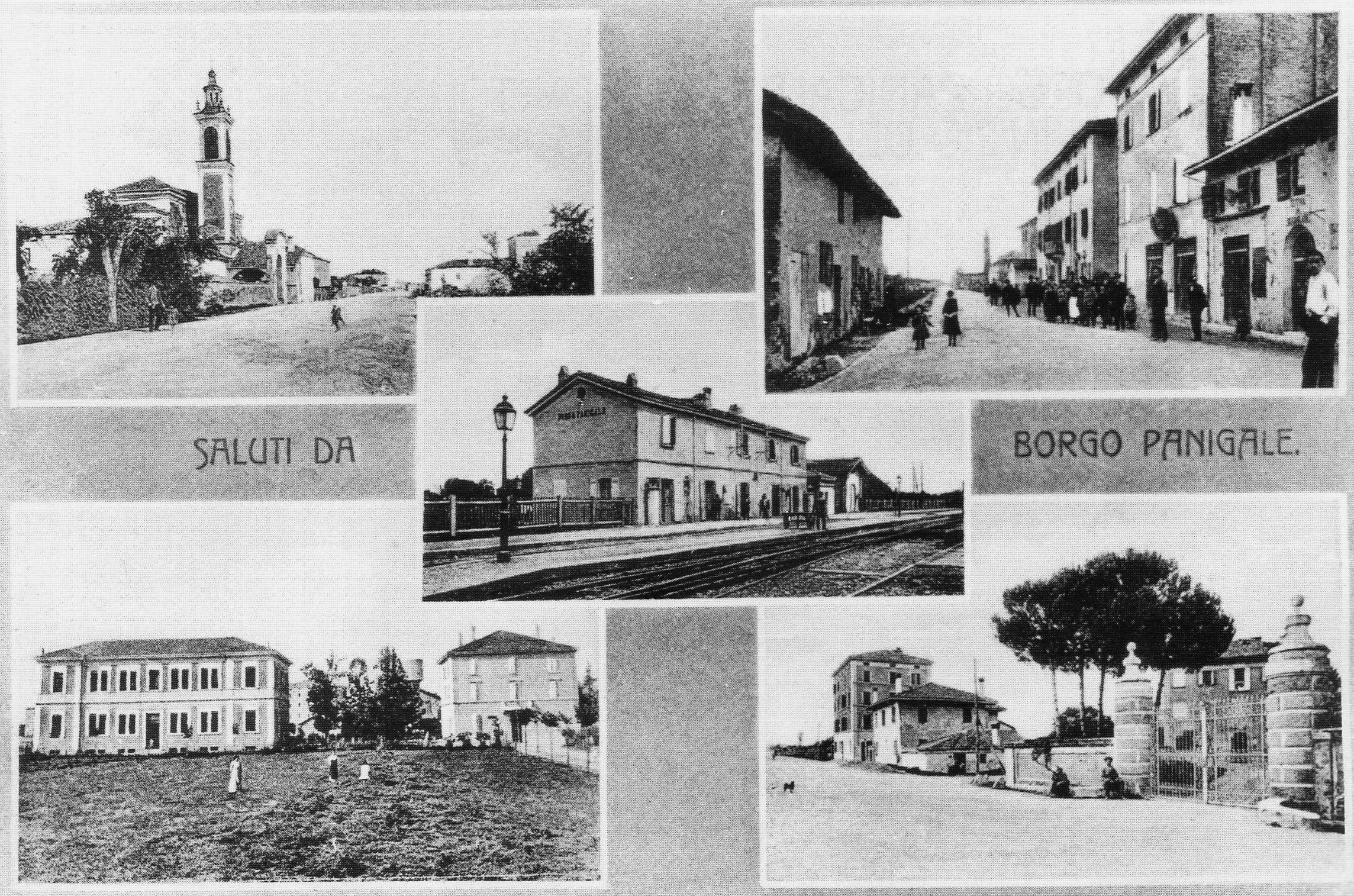
Historical postcard from the early 20th century with greetings from Borgo Panigale. Top left: Santa Maria Assunta Church. Bottom left: Municipal schools and Town Hall. Top right: Via Provinciale (now Via Marco Emilio Lepido) at the Osteria del Bersagliere. Center: Borgo Panigale railway station. Bottom right: Villa May (on present-day Via Panigale)

In 1832, Borgo Panigale became an independent municipality.

Upon Italy's unification in 1861, it was assigned the ISTAT code 037801 and the cadastral code B027. These were used until its incorporation into Bologna on November 5, 1937, when the fascist government decided to merge it with the city via Royal Decree No. 1793.

At the time of incorporation, it had 7,657 inhabitants.

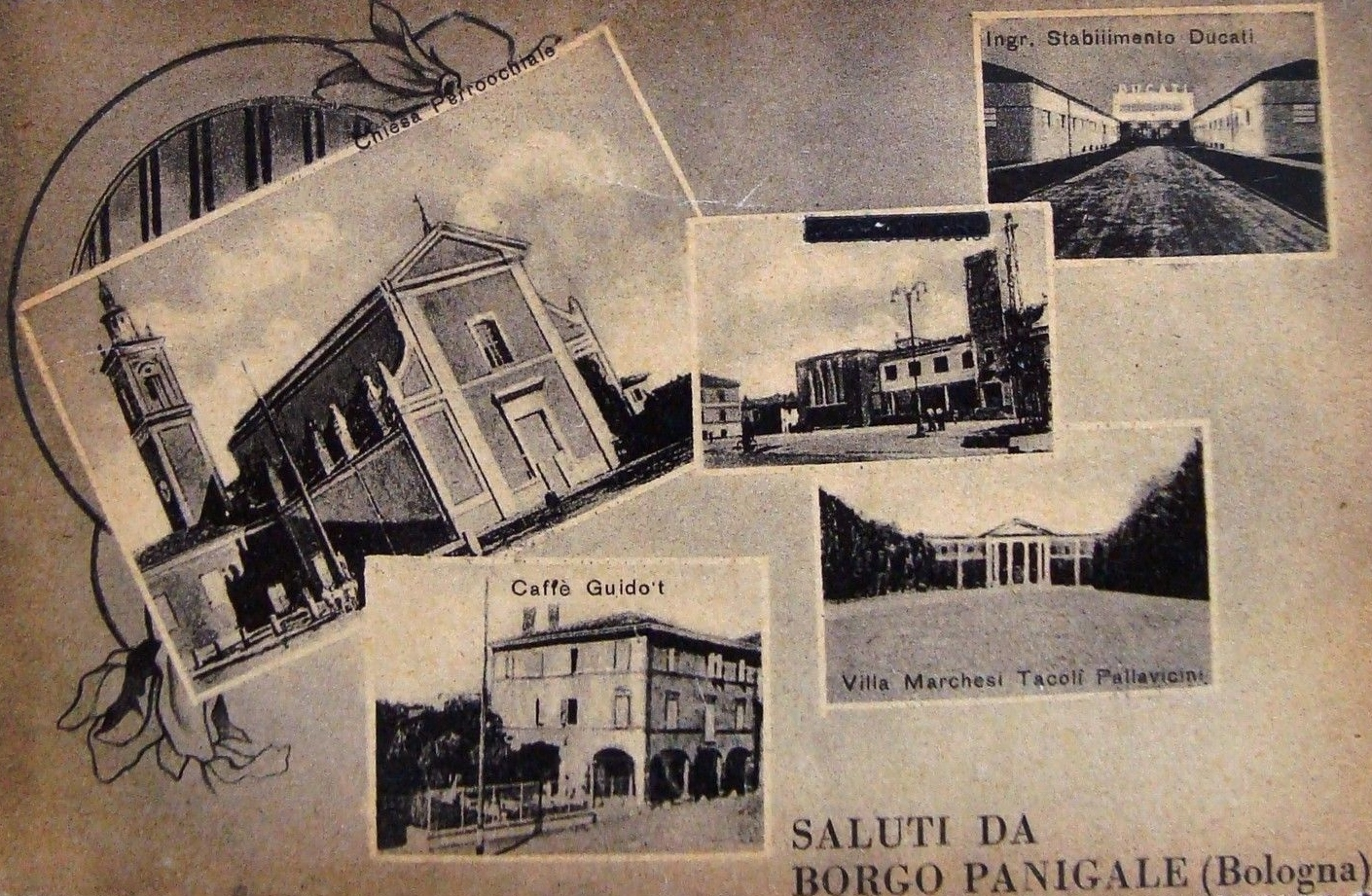
Historical postcard from the World War II period. Left: Santa Maria Assunta parish church. Center: Casa del Fascio. Top right: Entrance to the Ducati factory. Bottom right: Villa of the Marchesi Tacoli Pallavicini (today Villa Pallavicini). Bottom left: Caffe Guido't (in the center of Borgo Panigale).

From 1859 to 1927, it belonged to the Mandamento of Bologna II, within the Circondario of Bologna.

The Borgo Panigale area was heavily bombed by the Allies in 1943 due to the presence of factories, the airport, railway infrastructure, and the bridge over the Reno River.

On September 21, 1960, Bologna's municipal council decided to grant Borgo Panigale its own council, organizing it as a neighborhood.

In the administrative division in effect from 1964 to 1985, it was the neighborhood with the largest territorial extent.

In the administrative division effective from 1985, it became the second largest neighborhood by territorial extent, after the newly established Santo Stefano neighborhood.

Map of Bologna neighborhoods after 2016, with Borgo Panigale merged with the former Reno neighborhood.

Since June 2016, it has been merged with the Reno neighborhood to form the new Borgo Panigale-Reno neighborhood.

On August 6, 2018, the area was the site of a severe highway accident: a rear-end collision involving a truck carrying flammable liquid caused a powerful explosion, partially destroying the highway overpass on the Via Aemilia. The explosion resulted in two deaths—the truck driver and one person who was initially injured and later died after spending several days in the hospital—and over 100 injuries. The shockwave also damaged nearby buildings.

== Monuments and places of interest ==
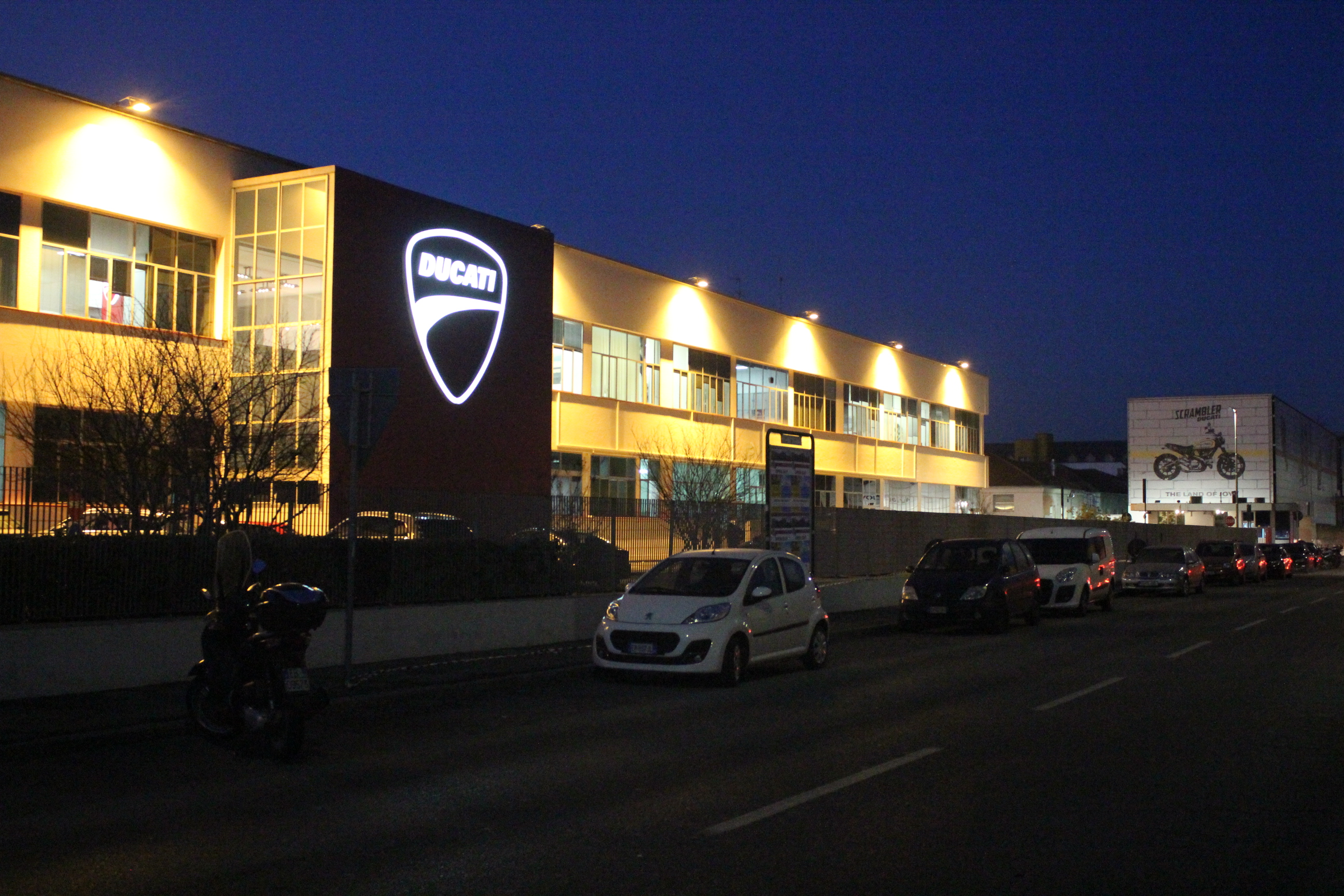
Headquarters of Ducati Motor Holding S.p.A., which houses the Ducati Museum

Unique among Bologna's neighborhoods for its history as an independent municipality, Borgo Panigale retains a historic center with a distinct 19th- and 20th-century character (on the left side of the Via Aemilia between Via della Pietra and Via Cavalieri Ducati), alongside more modern areas developed primarily during the construction boom of the 1950s, 1960s, and 1970s.

=== Religious architecture ===
==== Historic churches ====
- Santa Maria Assunta Church, located in the neighborhood's center, dating to the 13th century;
- Santa Maria del Carmine Church in Rigosa, located in the namesake hamlet, built in 1103 with its facade rebuilt in 1912;
- Santo Spirito Church in Lavino di Mezzo, located in Bologna's territory before the Lavino stream, though the hamlet of Lavino di Mezzo belongs to the municipality of Anzola dell'Emilia;
- Church of San Giovanni Battista di Medola, administratively linked to the Casteldebole hamlet, now used by the Bologna West Orthodox community ("Biserica Ortodoxă Bologna Vest");

Churches built as part of the "New Churches" initiative led by Cardinal Giacomo Lercaro:

- San Pio X Church, built in 1969, designed by architect Giorgio Trebbi;
- Nostra Signora della Pace Church in La Birra, with the original small church dating to 1955 and the current structure built in 1962, designed by engineer Pietro Bolognesi;
- Cuore Immacolato di Maria Church, with the original prefabricated wooden church dating to 1955 and the current structure built in 1969, designed by architects Giuseppe Vaccaro and Pier Luigi Nervi; it was inaugurated on September 18, 1971, by Cardinal Giacomo Lercaro;
- Santi Giovanni Battista e Gemma Galgani Church in Casteldebole, with the original structure dating to 1957 and the current building constructed in 1967, designed by architect Vittorio Martinuzzi.

=== Civil architecture ===
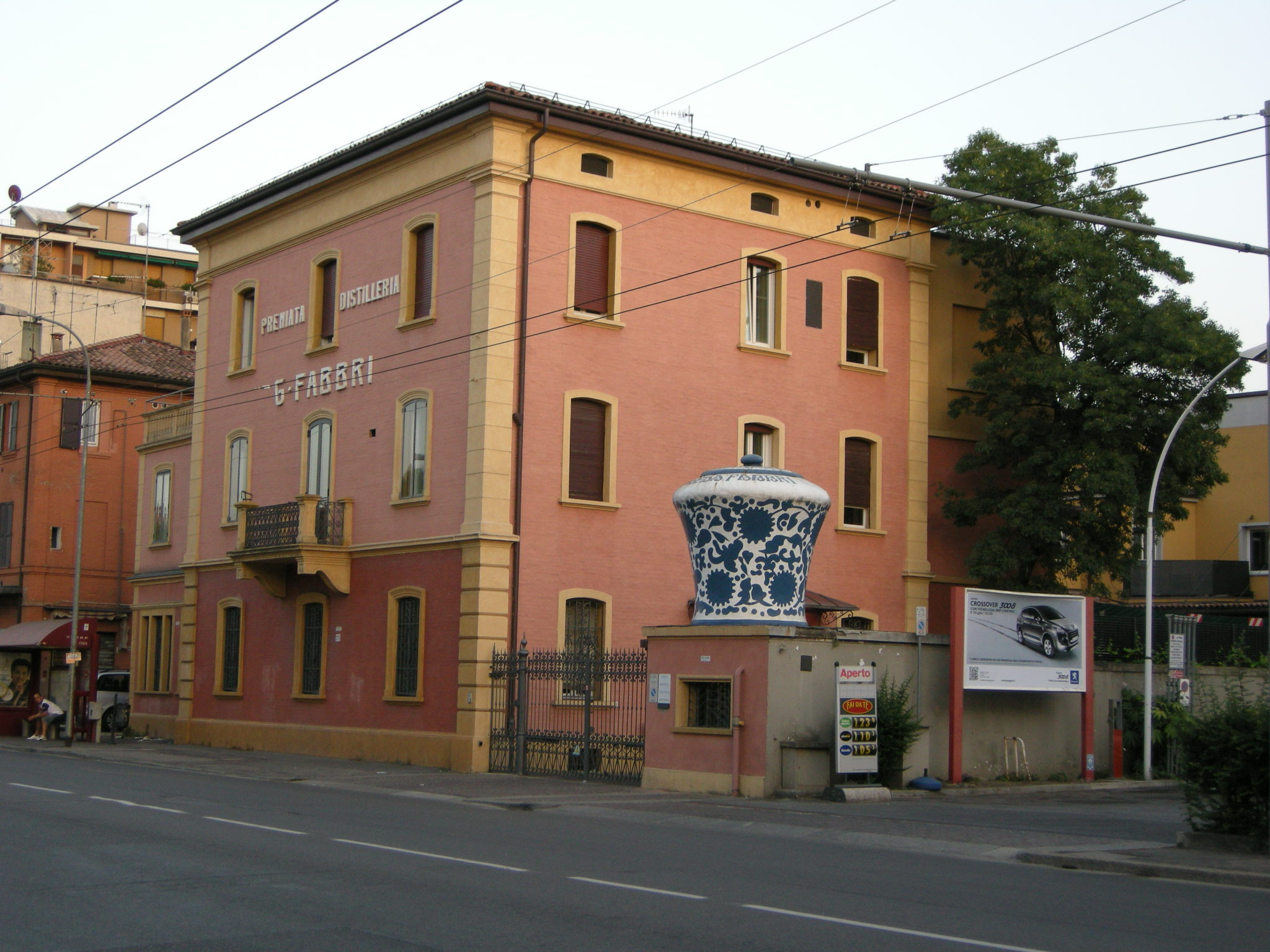
Historic headquarters of the Fabbri 1905 company

==== Historic villas ====
The neighborhood is characterized by countryside villas built by prominent Bolognese families in the 18th and 19th centuries. Notable examples include Villa Gina, in Liberty style, Villa May (on Via Panigale), Villa Pallavicini, and Villa Valmy.

===== Villa Pallavicini =====
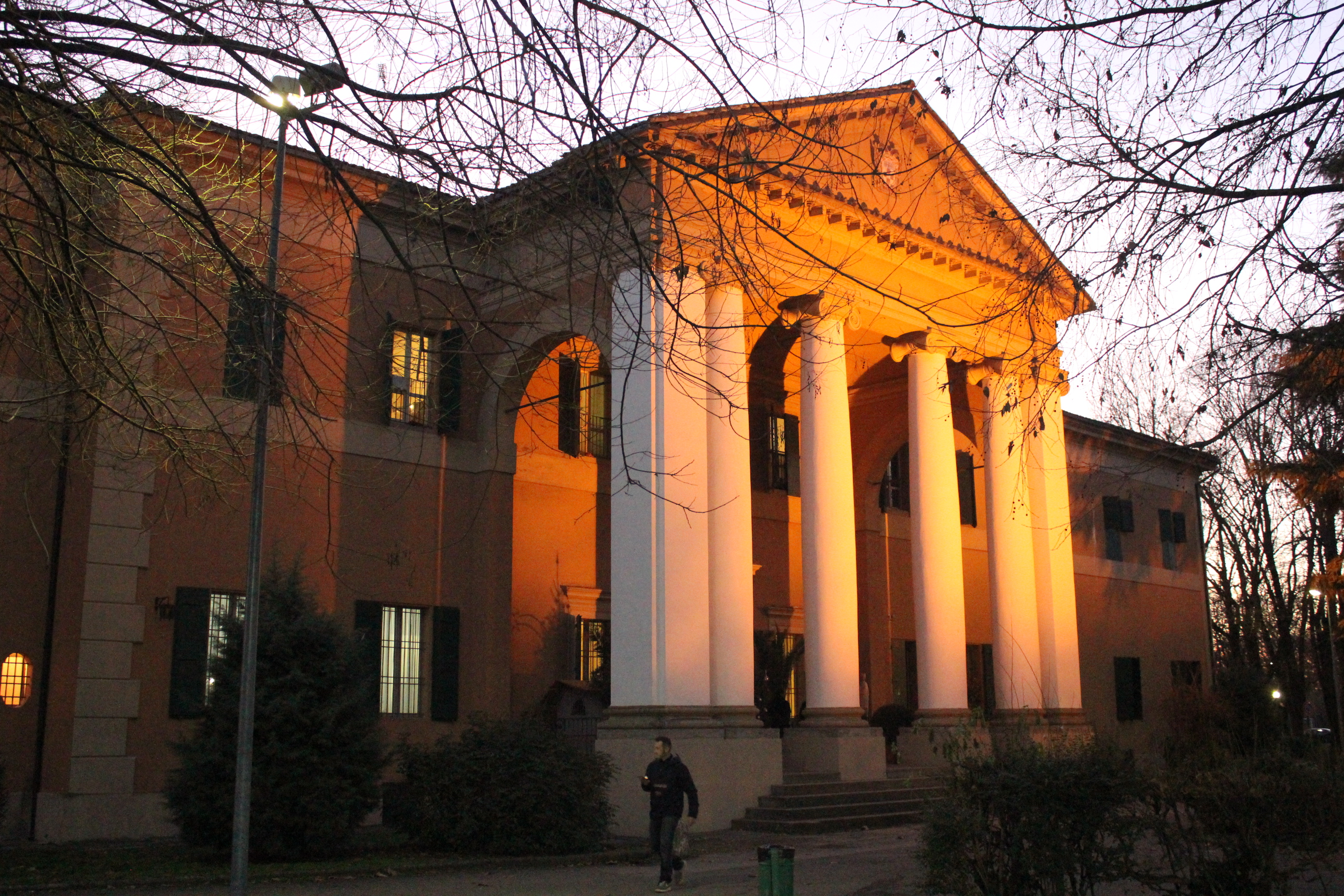
Neoclassical villa from the 18th century, with a majestic colonnade and triangular pediment, formerly owned by the Pallavicini counts of Bologna

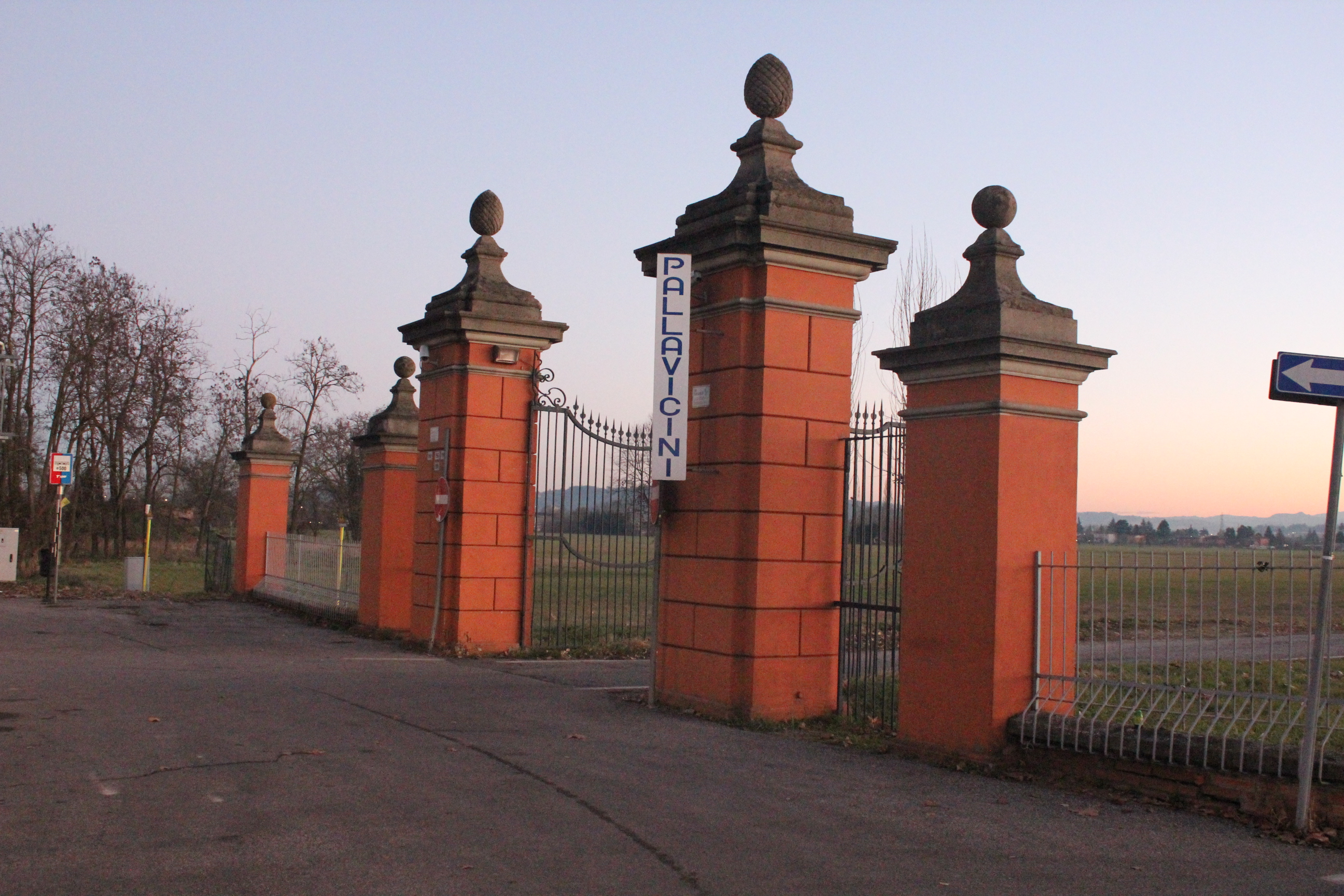
Entrance gate to the tree-lined avenue of Villa Pallavicini

The villa, once owned by the Pallavicini counts and known as Villa dei Marchesi Tacoli Pallavicini in the early 20th century, features decorations by:

- Domenico Pedrini (1728-1801), Bolognese painter, student of Bigari;
- Petronio Fancelli (1734-1800), quadraturist and ornamentalist, student of Mauro Tesi;
- Emilio Manfredi, painter and engraver, student of Ubaldo Gandolfi;
- Vincenzo Martinelli (1737-1807), painter in oil, tempera, and fresco, student of C. Lodi;
- Gaetano Caponeri, decorator and painter.

The villa's interior spaces include:

- Billiard Room
- Ballroom
- Dining Room (first on the left)
- Column Room
- Chinese Salon
- Pompeian Room
- Music Room
- Chapel

=== Pontelungo ===
Also noteworthy is the so-called "Pontelungo," the historic bridge connecting Borgo Panigale to Santa Viola along the Via Aemilia. Inaugurated in 1880, it inspired the novel by Riccardo Bacchelli, "The Devil at Pontelungo."

=== Parks and gardens ===
- Parco dei Pini
- Parco Città Campagna
- Giardino degli Olmi
- Giardino dei Pioppi
- Giardino Jerzy Popiełuszko
- Giardino dei Tassi
- Giardino dei Tigli
- Giardino dei Platani
- Giardino Imre Nagy
- Giardino dei Noci
- Giardino dei Bambù

== Culture ==
=== Education ===
==== Libraries ====
- Borgo Panigale Library

==== Collegio Superiore - Institute of Advanced Studies ====
The Collegio Superiore is an institution of excellence at the University of Bologna. One of the residences is located in Borgo Panigale. Eligible applicants include Erasmus students, exchange program students, and scholars.

== Society ==
=== Demographic evolution ===
Census population
| Year | Pop. | ±% |
|---|---|---|
| 1986 | 27,652 | — |
| 1991 | 25,774 | −6.8% |
| 1996 | 24,628 | −4.4% |
| 2001 | 24,171 | −1.9% |
| 2006 | 24,407 | +1.0% |
| 2011 | 25,350 | +3.9% |
| 2016 | 26,229 | +3.5% |
| 2021 | 26,589 | +1.4% |
Source: Resident population by age, neighborhood, and zone as of December 31 - historical series URL accessed on May 14, 2022

== Economy ==
=== Industry ===
- Ducati Energia Spa, with its foundation stone laid in 1935 for the new Ducati facilities
- Ducati Motor Holding Spa
- SNAM Rete GAS, Bologna district
- Fabbri 1905

== Human geography ==
=== Urban planning ===
The urban area of the neighborhood primarily develops along the Via Aemilia and the banks of the Reno River. The Via Aemilia alternative route (Viale Alcide De Gasperi) separates the residential neighborhood to the south from a large agricultural area (localities of Olmetola and Rigosa) that extends to the borders with the municipalities of Casalecchio di Reno and Zola Predosa, while to the north, the boundary is marked by the Bologna Ring Road.

==== Borgo Panigale Centro ====
The central area of Borgo, corresponding to the oldest part of the neighborhood, develops along the left side of the Via Aemilia (here named Via Marco Emilio Lepido), while the right side features mostly newer housing and the city's second cemetery. Among the most characteristic places are the Santa Maria Assunta Church (dating to the 12th century but significantly remodeled in its current form in the late 18th century), the former Casa del Fascio (now a Carabinieri barracks), the overpass on the Porrettana railway (with Art Nouveau-style refinements), and Villa May with the Oratory of Saint Thomas the Apostle.

La Scala

A suburban settlement from the second half of the 19th century, now fully integrated into the urban fabric. The locality, whose name's origin is uncertain, was located on the north side of Via Emilia Ponente near the Porrettana railway. At the intersection with the road to San Giovanni in Persiceto, now Via Marco Celio, there was historically an "Osteria della Scala," whose building still stands today. The settlement gave its name to the Borgo Panigale Scala railway station.

La Birra

A locality on the left bank of the Reno River, north of the railway tracks, along Via del Triumvirato, which connects the Via Aemilia to the airport. It takes its name from the former "Birra Bologna" brewery. The area saw significant urban expansion after World War II, and in 1955, the parish of Our Lady of Peace was established, separated from Santa Maria Assunta.

==== Villaggio INA ====
A public housing neighborhood built between 1953 and 1954, designed by Bolognese architect Giuseppe Vaccaro. It is now a green residential area near the Ducati factories. In 1989, the "Centro Borgo" shopping center was inaugurated nearby.

==== Casteldebole ====
A residential area south of Borgo Panigale's historic core, separated by Viale Palmiro Togliatti. It is home to the Casteldebole railway station and the training center for Bologna Football Club.

== Infrastructure and transport ==
=== Roads ===
Since Roman times, the Vicus Panicalis was the western entrance to Bologna along the Via Aemilia. The Via Aemilia is a state road, designated as SS 9. Within the neighborhood, it takes the following names:

- Westward: Via Marco Emilio Lepido, named after the Roman consul who built it;
- Eastward: Via Emilia Ponente.

In the early 1950s, a variant of the Via Aemilia was constructed, consisting of Viale Alcide de Gasperi, which continues as Viale Palmiro Togliatti.

==== Pontelungo ====
The bridge over the Reno River was originally built by the Romans about 130 meters downstream from the current bridge. It had 18 arches, was 200 meters long, and 11.5 meters wide. Frequent floods caused its collapse by the end of the 8th century. A new bridge is mentioned in the 12th century, subject to a toll. Frequent floods (in 1650 and 1771) damaged its structure, leading to the construction of a third bridge between 1878 and 1880.

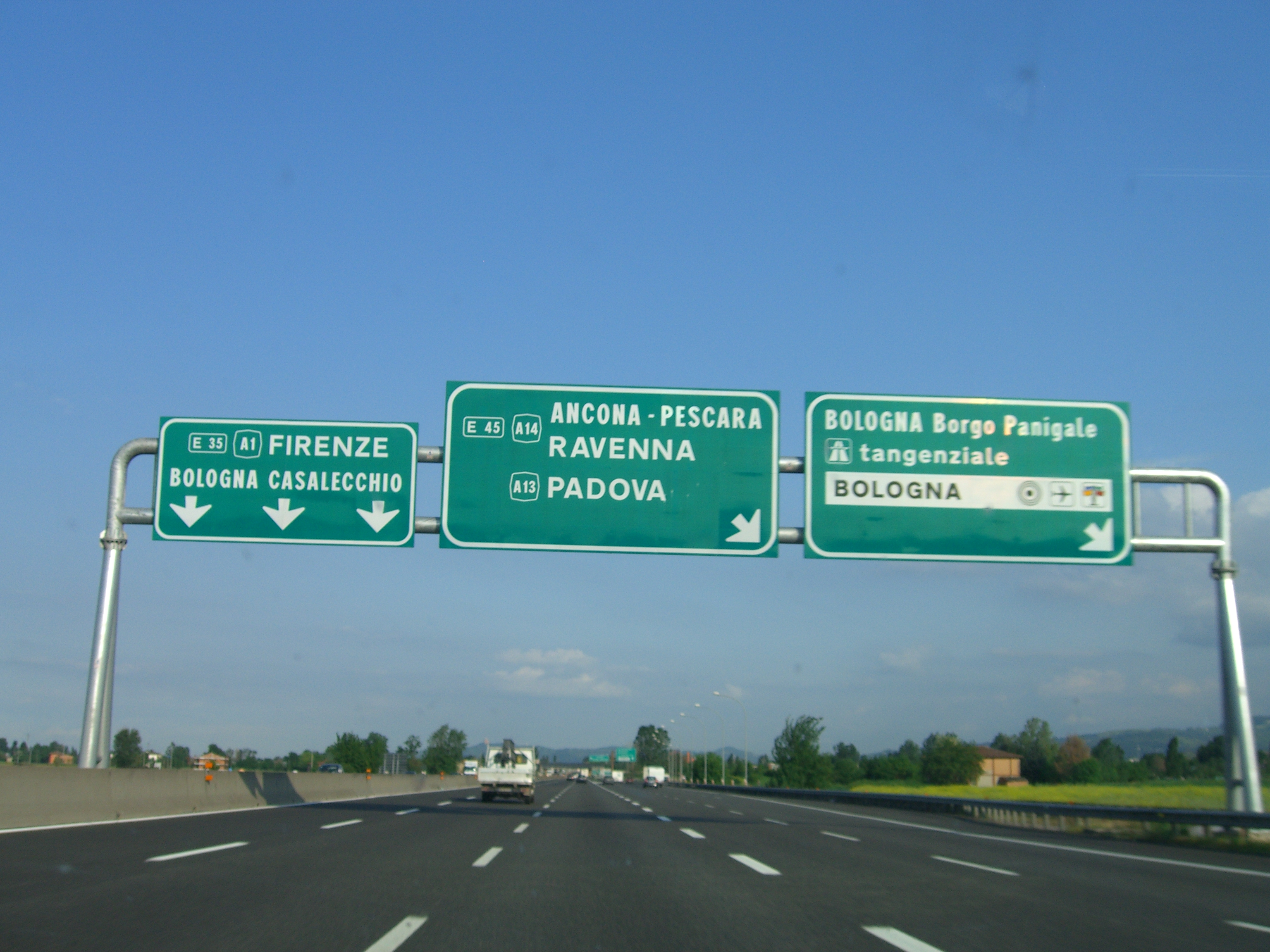
Branch of the A1 that leads to the Borgo Panigale highway toll booth

==== Highways ====
Borgo Panigale is a major highway hub for Bologna, served by the Bologna-Borgo Panigale toll booth and crossed by the two initial branches of the A14 motorway, built in the early 1960s:

- Original branch or Green Branch
- Casalecchio Branch

=== Railways ===
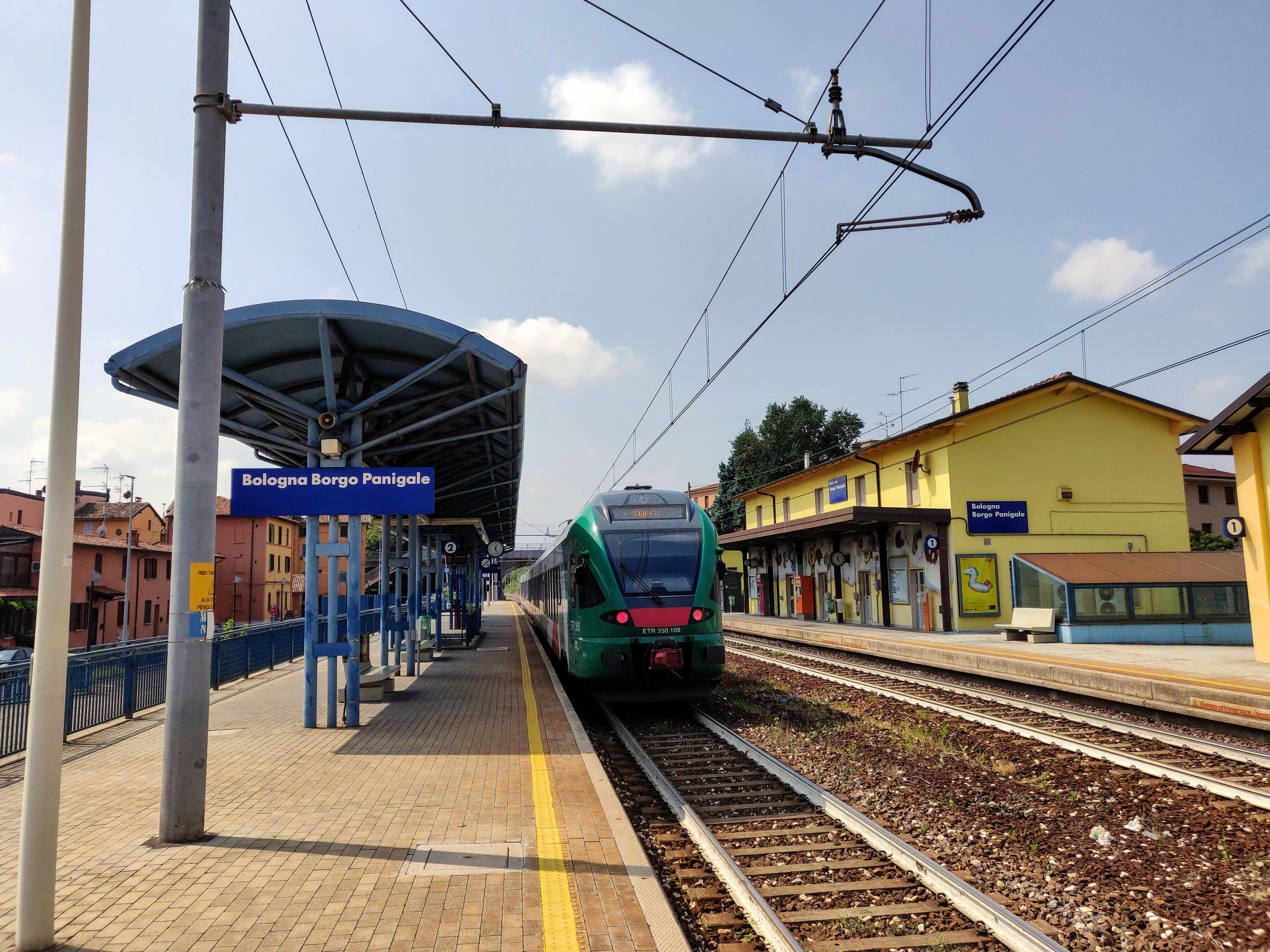
Bologna Borgo Panigale railway station

Borgo Panigale is served by the Bologna Borgo Panigale railway station and the Casteldebole railway station, both on the Porrettana railway. Both stations are served by lines S1A (Bologna Centrale-Porretta Terme) and S2A (Bologna Centrale-Vignola) of the Bologna metropolitan railway service.

The Borgo Panigale Scala railway station was located near the current La Birra area, along Via del Triumvirato. Another station with the same name is under construction along Via Bencivenni (an alternative name, Bologna Airport, has been proposed to avoid confusion).

=== Airport ===
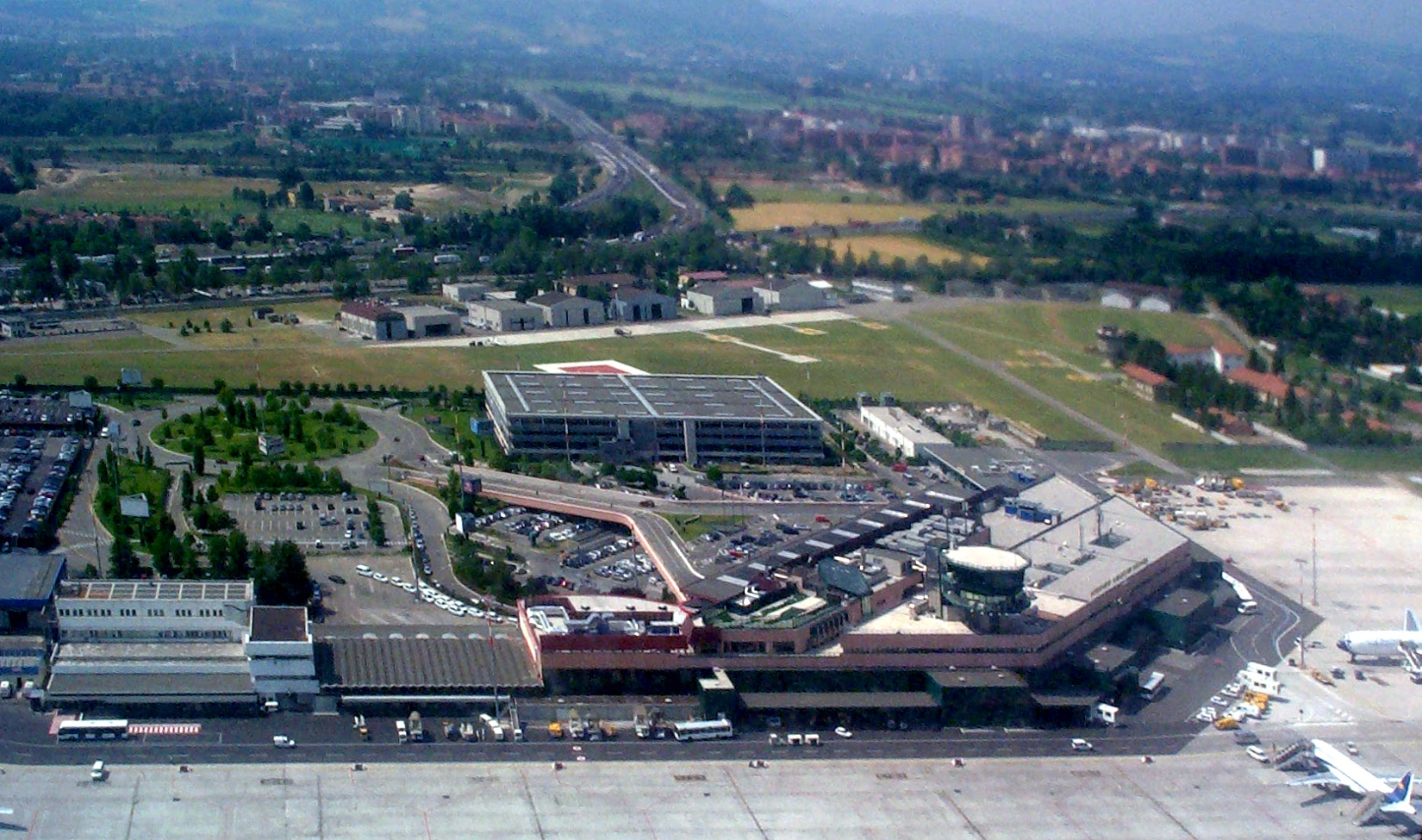
Guglielmo Marconi Airport in Borgo Panigale

One of Italy's major airports, the only one in Bologna, is located in the northern part of Borgo Panigale and is named after Guglielmo Marconi. It also is home to the Bologna Borgo Panigale weather station, managed by the Italian Air Force. In 1931, the Fausto Pesci military airport was relocated from Prati di Caprara to Borgo Panigale. The first scheduled service began in 1933, and the airport was inaugurated in 1936.

The airport is connected to Bologna Centrale railway station by the Marconi Express, a people mover system.

=== Urban mobility ===
Bologna's public transport service, managed by TPER, connects Borgo Panigale to the city center with line 23 (along the Via Aemilia) terminating at Via Normandia and Lavino di Mezzo, and line 19 terminating at Casteldebole railway station.

The neighborhood will also be the terminus of the "red line" of the Bologna tramway, with planned stops in Borgo at Fiorini, Borgo Panigale SFM, Manuzio, Ducati, Villaggio INA, and Emilio Lepido.

== Administration ==
=== Consulates ===
As of January 12, 2019, the "General Consulate of the Kingdom of Morocco in Bologna" is present.

== Sports ==
=== Sports organizations and clubs ===
Polisportiva Atletico Borgo Panigale

- Atletico Basket
- Atletico Borgo 1993
- Atletico Euroskate
- Atletico H
- Podistica Atletico Bolognese
- Atletico Volley

Polisportiva Antal Pallavicini

- Basketball
- Football
- Artistic gymnastics
- Karate
- Power hockey
- Muay Thai

Italian Union of Sports for All (UISP)

- Cavina Swimming Center

Bologna FC 1909

Italian Sports Center (CSI)

In association football, the neighborhood was historically represented by Panigale Calcio, which reached Prima Divisione and Serie C in the 1940s. Its successor is now A.S.D. Casteldebole Panigal 1919.

Borgo Panigale is also home to the motorcycle racing team Ducati Corse.

=== Sports facilities ===
The following sports facilities are located in the Borgo Panigale area:

- Cavina Sports Center
- Cavina Swimming Pool
- Cardinal Giacomo Lercaro Gymnasium, named after the cardinal in 1976
- Villa Pallavicini Sports Center
- Casteldebole Sports Center
- Niccolò Galli Technical Center, home of Bologna FC 1909
- Airport Tennis Club
- Lavinese Bowling Club
- Baldini Bowling Club
- Polisportiva Coop. Italia Nuova - Fiorini Bowling Alley

== Bibliography ==
- Texts by Anna Rosa Bambi and others, edited by Manuela Iodice, with an introduction by Eugenio Riccomini, Borgo Panigale: from Mesolithic village to urban neighborhood, CRABP (Cassa Rurale ed Artigiana Borgo Panigale), 1990, SBN Code: CFI0173108, ASIN: B07KFJC2DJ
- Stefanelli, Evaristo (1975). Bologna, beyond Porta Stiera. Bologna: Richelmy Editore. SBN UBO0122758.
