= Bologna San Vitale railway station =

Railway station in Italy

Bologna San Vitale

General information
- Location: Bologna; Italy
- Coordinates: 44.4962°N 11.3733°E
- Operator: Rete Ferroviaria Italiana
- Lines: Bologna–Ancona, Bologna–Florence
- Tracks: 4
- Train operators: Trenitalia Tper
- Connections: Bologna buses, Bologna Rimesse railway station

Other information
- Classification: Bronze

History
- Opened: 2013
Location
- Location within Emilia-Romagna Location within Northern Italy Location within Italy

Bologna San Vitale (Italian: Stazione di Bologna San Vitale) is a railway station in Bologna, Italy. The station opened in 2013 and is located on the Bologna–Ancona and Bologna–Florence lines. The train services are operated by Trenitalia Tper.

The station is managed by Rete Ferroviaria Italiana (RFI), a subsidiary of Ferrovie dello Stato Italiane (FSI), Italy's state-owned rail company.

== Location ==
Bologna San Vitale railway station is situated east of the city centre in the San Donato-San Vitale borough.

== History ==
The station was formally opened on 15 December 2013. Commercial service on the Bologna-Ancona line started on 14 September 2014, while services on the Bologna–Florence line began on 13 December 2015.

== Features ==
The station does not feature any building.

It consists of four tracks.

== Train services ==
The station is served by the following service(s):

- Suburban services (Treno suburbano) on line S1B, Bologna - San Benedetto Val di Sambro
- Suburban services (Treno suburbano) on line S4B, Bologna - Imola

== See also ==
- List of railway stations in Bologna
- List of railway stations in Emilia-Romagna
- Bologna metropolitan railway service
