= Bologna Corticella railway station =

Railway halt in Italy

Bologna Corticella

General information
- Location: Corticella, Bologna, Emilia-Romagna; Italy
- Coordinates: 44.552°N 11.354°E
- Operator: Rete Ferroviaria Italiana
- Line: Padua–Bologna railway
- Tracks: 4
- Train operators: Trenitalia Tper
- Connections: Bologna buses

Other information
- Classification: Bronze

History
- Opened: 1864
Location
- Location within Emilia-Romagna Location within Northern Italy Location within Italy

Bologna Corticella (Italian: Stazione di Bologna Corticella) is a railway station serving the suburb of Corticella, part of the city of Bologna, in the region of Emilia-Romagna, northern Italy. The station is located on the Padua–Bologna railway. All train services are operated by Trenitalia Tper.

The station is currently managed by Rete Ferroviaria Italiana (RFI), a subsidiary of Ferrovie dello Stato Italiane (FSI), Italy's state-owned rail company.

== Location ==
Bologna Corticella railway station is located north of the city centre.

== History ==
The station was activated in 1864.

It was downgraded to railway halt on 30 November 2003.

== Features ==
The station consists of four tracks linked by an underpass.

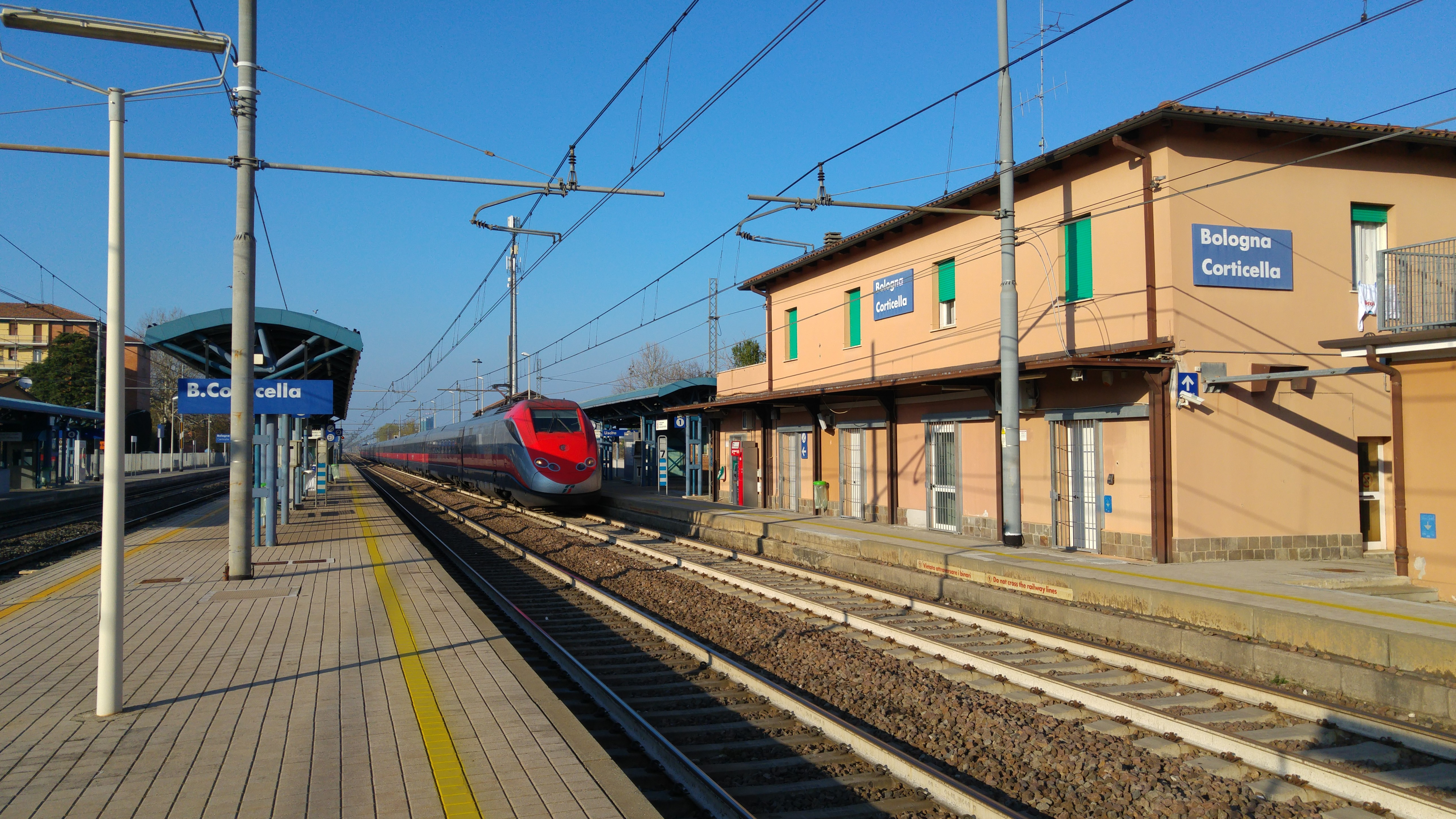

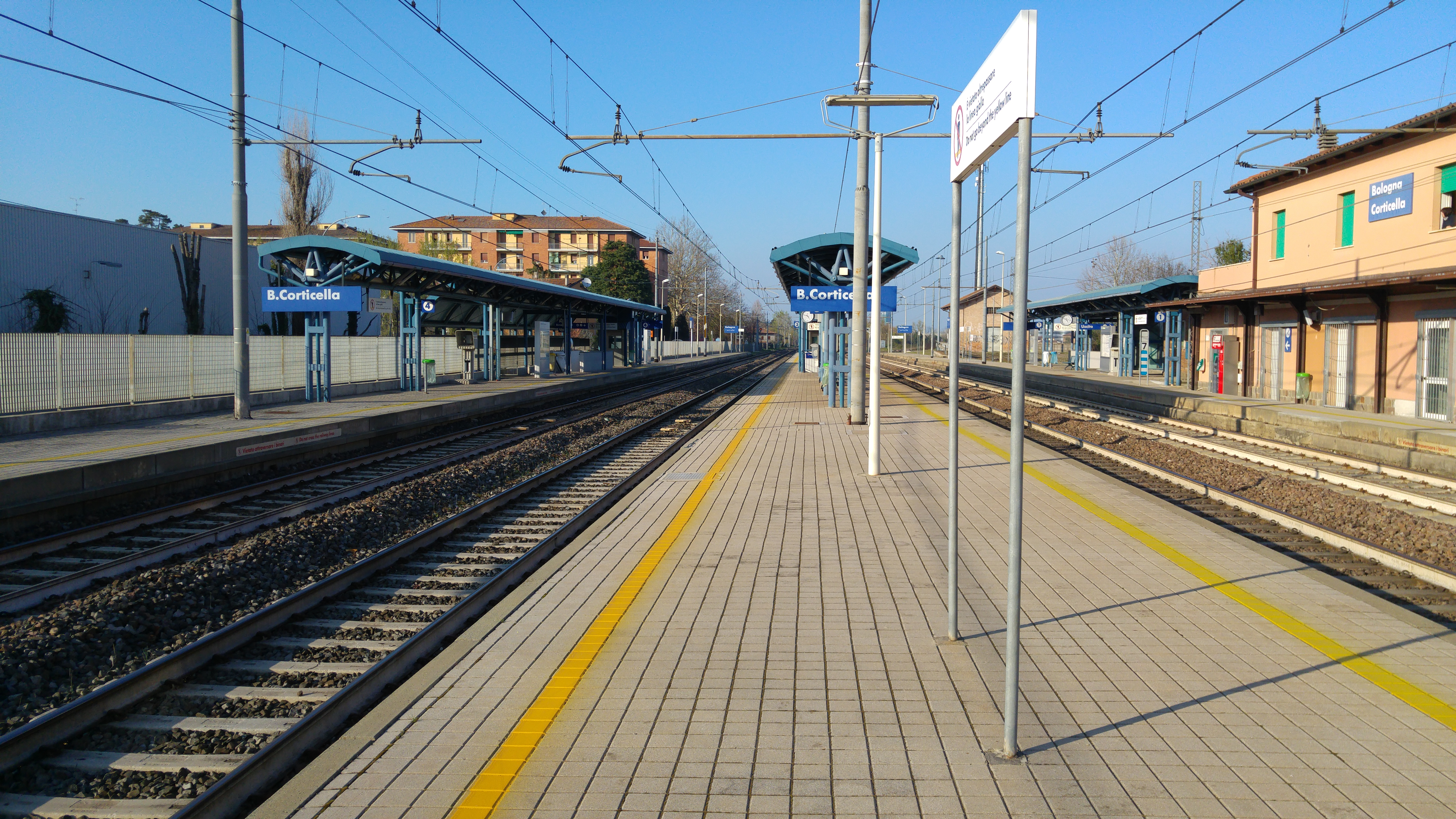

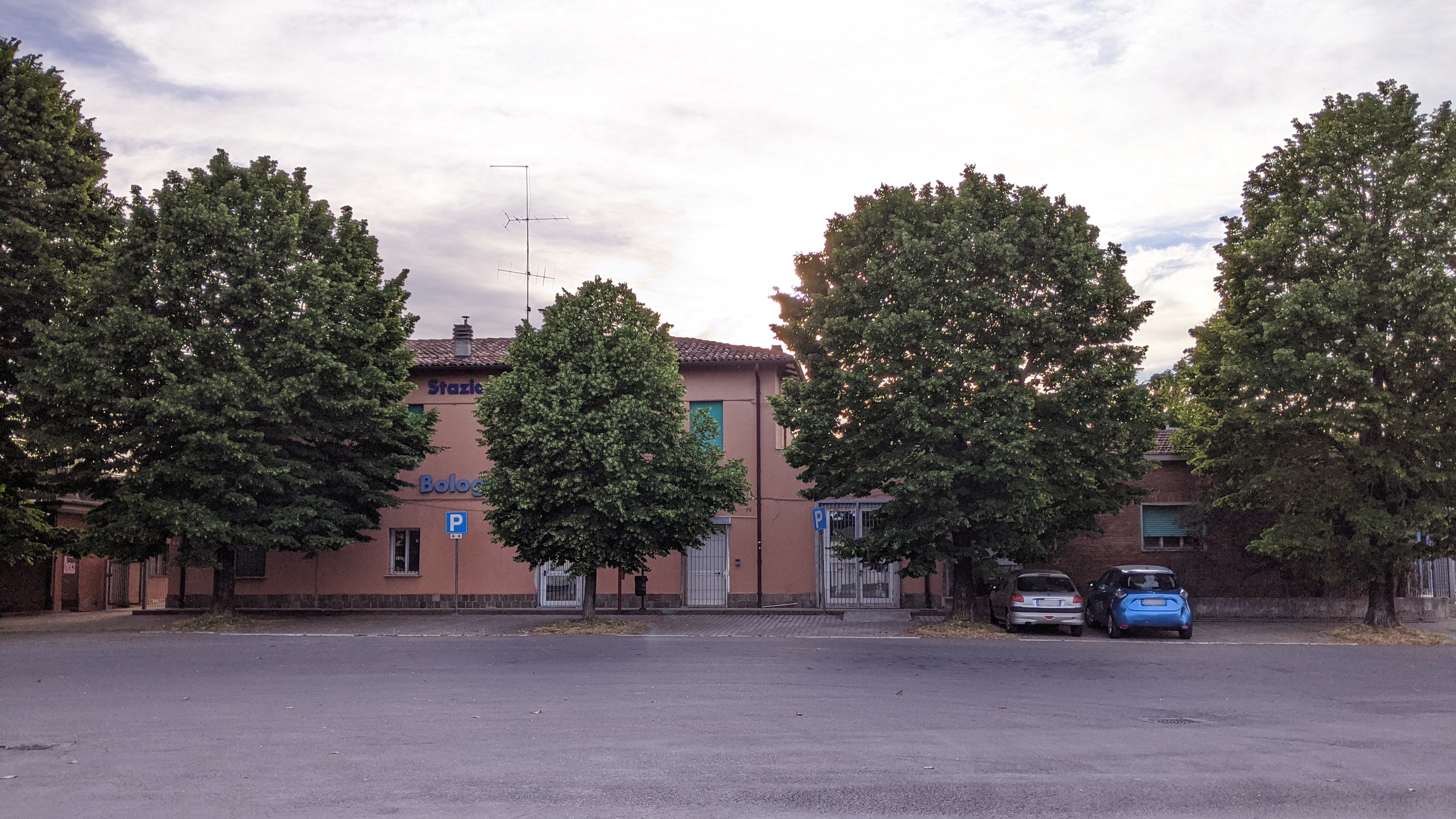

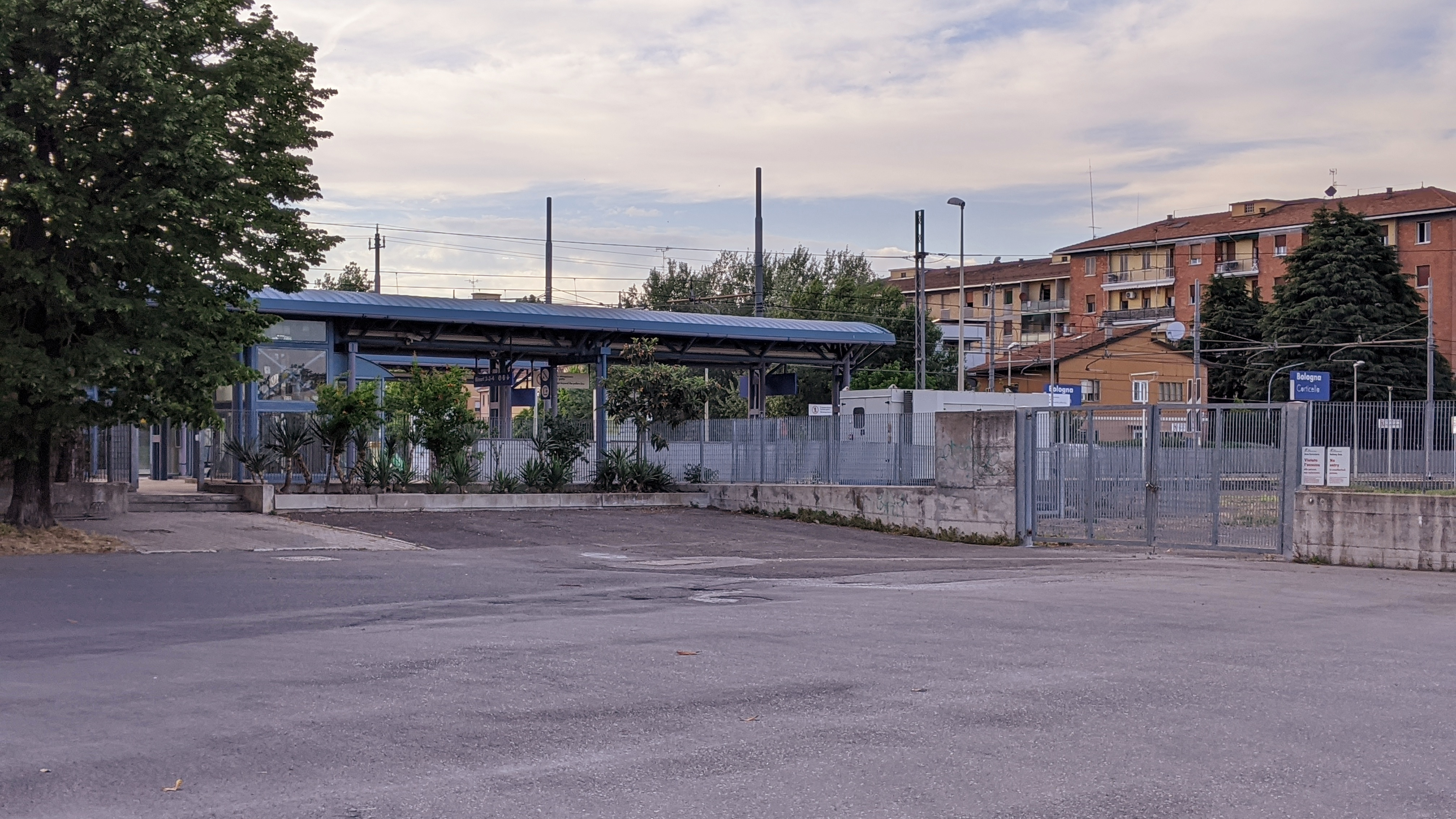

== Train services ==
The station is served by the following service(s):

- Suburban services (Treno suburbano) on line S4A, Bologna - Ferrara

== See also ==
- List of railway stations in Bologna
- List of railway stations in Emilia-Romagna
- Bologna metropolitan railway service
