= Bologna Mazzini railway station =

Railway station in Italy

Bologna Mazzini

General information
- Location: Bologna; Italy
- Coordinates: 44.4827°N 11.3763°E
- Operator: Rete Ferroviaria Italiana
- Line: Bologna–Florence
- Tracks: 2
- Train operators: Trenitalia Tper
- Connections: Bologna buses

Other information
- Classification: Bronze

History
- Opened: 2013
Location
- Location within Emilia-Romagna Location within Northern Italy Location within Italy

Bologna Mazzini (Italian: Stazione di Bologna Mazzini) is a railway station in Bologna, Italy. The station opened in 2013 and is located on the Bologna–Florence railway. Train services are operated by Trenitalia Tper.

The station is managed by Rete Ferroviaria Italiana (RFI), a subsidiary of Ferrovie dello Stato Italiane (FSI), Italy's state-owned rail company.

== Location ==
Bologna Mazzini railway station is situated east of the city centre, along the via Emilia.

== History ==
The station was formally opened on 4 June 2013. Commercial service began on 9 June 2013.

== Features ==
The station does not feature any building.

It consists of two tracks.

== Train services ==
The station is served by the following service(s):

- Suburban services (Treno suburbano) on line S1B, Bologna - San Benedetto Val di Sambro

== See also ==
- List of railway stations in Bologna
- List of railway stations in Emilia-Romagna
- Bologna metropolitan railway service
