= Bologna San Ruffillo railway station =

Railway station in Italy

San Ruffillo

General information
- Location: Bologna; Italy
- Coordinates: 44°27′46″N 11°22′22″E
- Operator: Rete Ferroviaria Italiana
- Line: Bologna–Florence
- Tracks: 4
- Train operators: Trenitalia Tper
- Connections: Bologna buses

Other information
- Classification: Bronze

History
- Opened: 1934
Location
- Location within Emilia-Romagna Location within Northern Italy Location within Italy

Bologna San Ruffillo (Italian: Stazione di Bologna San Ruffillo) is a railway station in Bologna, Italy. The station opened in 1934 and is located on the Bologna–Florence railway. Train services are operated by Trenitalia Tper.

The station is managed by Rete Ferroviaria Italiana (RFI), a subsidiary of Ferrovie dello Stato Italiane (FSI), Italy's state-owned rail company.

== Location ==
Bologna San Ruffillo railway station is situated south-east of the city centre, in the Savena borough.

== History ==
The station opened in 1934, when the railway line itself was inaugurated.

== Features ==
The station consists of four tracks.

== Train services ==
The station is served by the following service(s):

- Suburban services (Treno suburbano) on line S1B, Bologna - San Benedetto Val di Sambro

== See also ==
- List of railway stations in Bologna
- List of railway stations in Emilia-Romagna
- Bologna metropolitan railway service
