= Bologna Borgo Panigale railway station =

Railway halt in Italy

Bologna Borgo Panigale

General information
- Location: Borgo Panigale, Bologna, Emilia-Romagna; Italy
- Coordinates: 44.515°N 11.284°E
- Operator: Rete Ferroviaria Italiana
- Line: Bologna-Porretta
- Tracks: 2
- Train operators: Trenitalia Tper
- Connections: Bologna buses

Other information
- Classification: Silver
Location
- Location within Emilia-Romagna Location within Northern Italy Location within Italy

Bologna Borgo Panigale (Italian: Stazione di Bologna Borgo Panigale) is a railway station serving the suburb of Borgo Panigale, part of the city of Bologna, in the region of Emilia-Romagna, northern Italy. The station is located on the Porrettana railway. The train services are operated by Trenitalia Tper.

The station is currently managed by Rete Ferroviaria Italiana (RFI), a subsidiary of Ferrovie dello Stato Italiane (FSI), Italy's state-owned rail company.

== Location ==
Bologna Borgo Panigale railway station is west of the city centre.

== History ==
The station, formerly known as "Borgo Panigale", was renamed as "Bologna Borgo Panigale" in 1938. The suburb Borgo Panigale had been merged into the city of Bologna in 1937.

The station was downgraded to a railway halt on 21 December 2001.

== Features ==
The station consists of two tracks linked by an underpass.

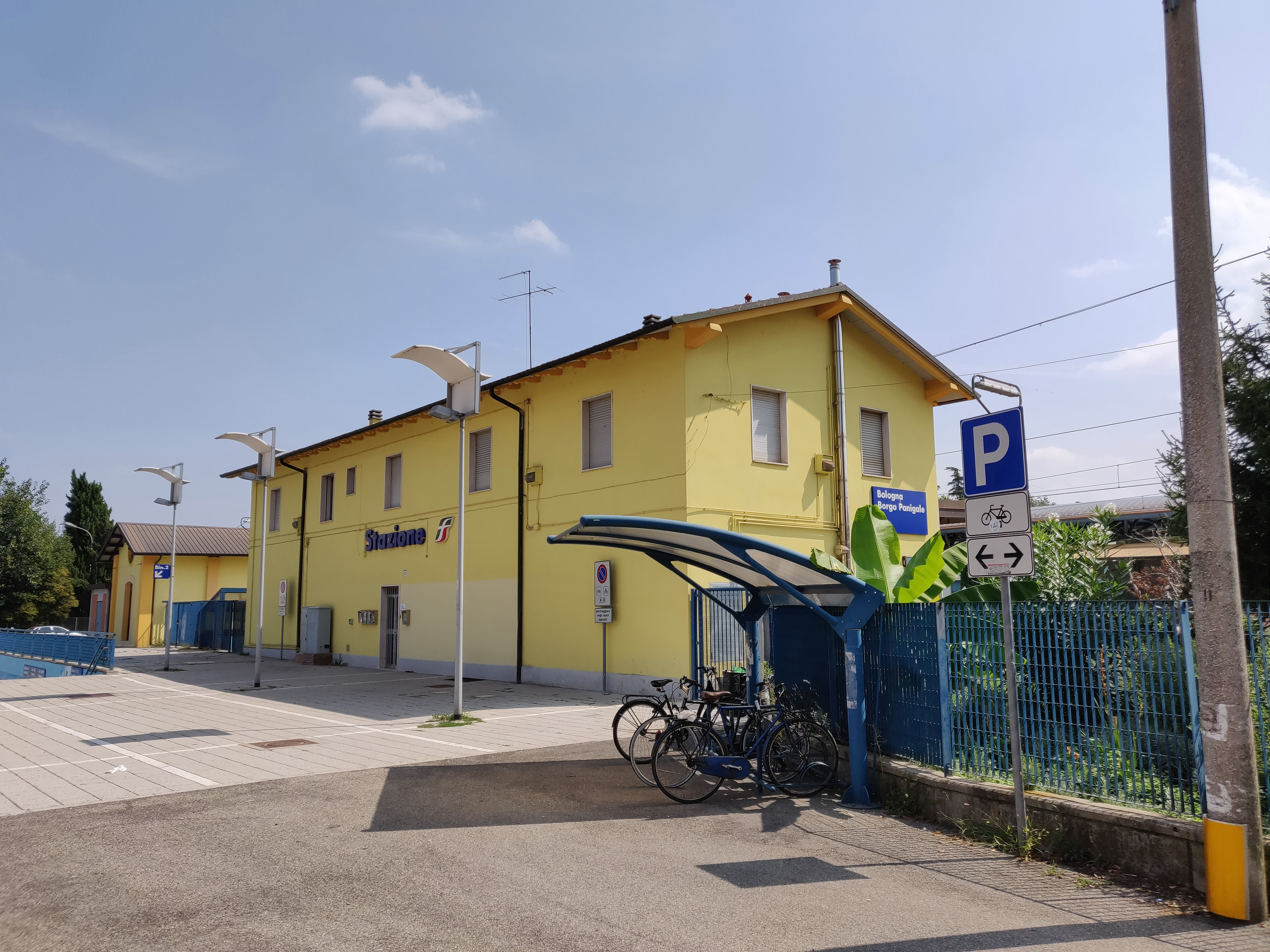

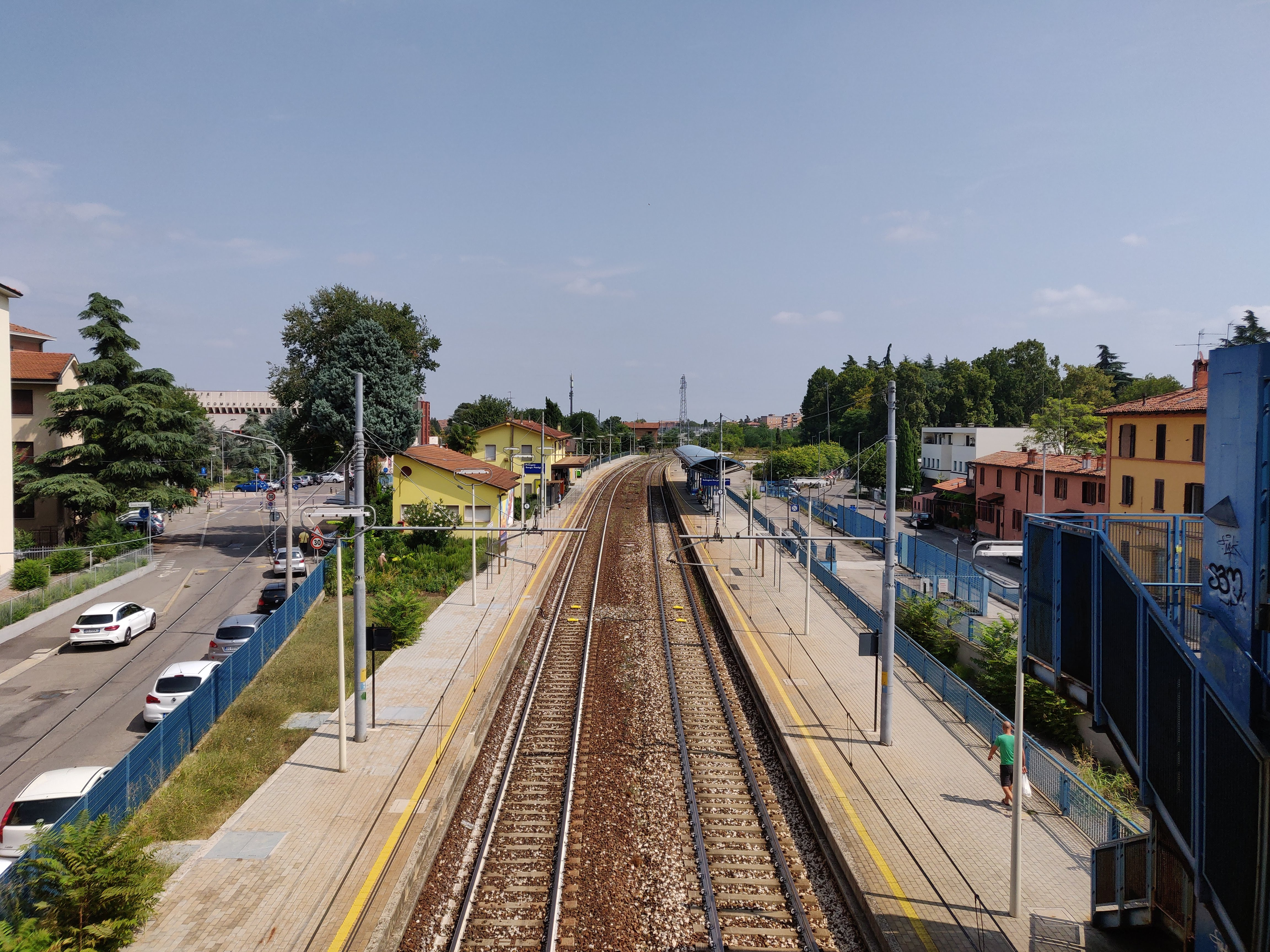

== Train services ==
The station is served by the following service(s):

- Suburban services (Treno suburbano) on line S1A, Bologna - Porretta Terme
- Suburban services (Treno suburbano) on line S2A, Bologna - Vignola

== See also ==
- List of railway stations in Bologna
- List of railway stations in Emilia-Romagna
- Bologna metropolitan railway service
