= List of Bologna metro stations =

The following was a list of stations on the Metropolitana di Bologna, an old project of underground in Bologna. The project of the underground had stalled after a dispute between the regional government of Emilia-Romagna, the local government and the central government. A new project has been approved in 2007 and is now partially funded by the Government. On October 13, 2009 the municipal government decided to use a project financing strategy in order to provide for a quick start of the works. The new project originally included an overground segment. On October 15, 2009 the idea of building a partially overground system was abandoned, and the system is probably going to be entirely underground.

== List of planned stations ==
- Fiera Michelino
- Regione-San Donato
- Fiera-Regione
- Liberazione
- Bolognina
- Stazione FS
- VIII Agosto
- Piazza Maggiore
- Ugo Bassi
- Riva Reno
- Malvasia
- Ospedale Maggiore
- Prati di Caprara
- Battindarno
- Santa Viola
- Pontelungo
- Cinta
- Borgo Panigale FS
- Scala
- Borgo Panigale Chiesa
- Ducati
- Luther King
- Normandia

== See also ==
- Bologna metropolitan railway service
