= Giacomo Cantelli =

Italian cartographer and engraver (1643–1695)

- Cantelli c. 1680
- Born: Giacomo Betti; February 1643; Vignola, Papal States (in modern Province of Modena, Italy)
- Died: 30 November 1695 (aged 52); Possibly Modena
- Education: University of Bologna
- Occupation: Cartographer

Giacomo Cantelli da Vignola (February 1643 − 30 November 1695) was an Italian cartographer and engraver of the 17th century.

== Biography ==
=== Early life and education ===
Giacomo Cantelli was born in Montorsello, a village near Vignola. He studied literature at the University of Bologna and, upon completing his studies, was hired as a secretary by the Marquess Pio Enea Obizzi of Ferrara. Later he moved to Venice, where he began his career as a geographer and cartographer. In the 1660s, Cantelli joined the entourage of the French ambassador to Venice, who was returning to the court of Louis XIV. In Paris, he made the acquaintance of French cartographers Guillaume Sanson, Jacques-André Duval, and Michel-Antoine Baudrand.

=== Early career ===
Upon returning to Bologna, Cantelli became secretary to Count Rinieri Marescotti and continued his geographical studies. He likely traveled to Lombardy and the Kingdom of Naples, and he certainly visited Rome, where he met his publisher, Giovanni Giacomo de Rossi, who began publishing his drawings in 1672.

Dating from this period are maps of the Holy Land, the Kingdom of Persia, the Kingdom of Naples and the Ottoman Empire. His maps of Lombardy were published in the atlas Mercurio Geografico, issued in Rome by Giovanni Giacomo De Rossi in 1680-1681.

In 1682, he published maps of the Kingdom of Sicily and Qing China in Rome. The following year came maps of Tartary, Greece, the Moluccas, the Philippines (along with the Sunda Islands), India, and eastern Hungary. In 1684, he published maps of several European regions, including the course of the Danube, the Archduchy of Austria, Dalmatia and the Kingdom of the Morea.

=== Cartographer to Francesco II d'Este ===
In 1685 Cantelli was made court cartographer to Francesco II d'Este, Duke of Modena. Between 1686 and 1689, he produced numerous maps of European countries. He constructed terrestrial and celestial globes, which were displayed in the atrium of the Biblioteca Estense in Modena. In 1689, he published a well-known map of Serbia.

In 1691, Cantelli and Bernardino Ramazzini persuaded the Duke to invite Benedetto Bacchini to Modena. Bacchini was appointed historiographer to the Estense court and became the mentor of the Modenese historian Ludovico Antonio Muratori. Cantelli's final works (1694–1695) were a map of Spain and one of north-western Italy with the Dauphiné and Provence. He died in 1695 at the age of 52. He died in Modena in 1695, aged 52.

== Gallery of images ==
Map of China, 1682

Map of Great Tartary, 1683

Map of Southeast Asia, 1684

Map of Macedonia and Thessaly, 1684

Map of Peloponnesus, 1685

Map of Asia Minor, 1686

Map of the Holy Land, 1688

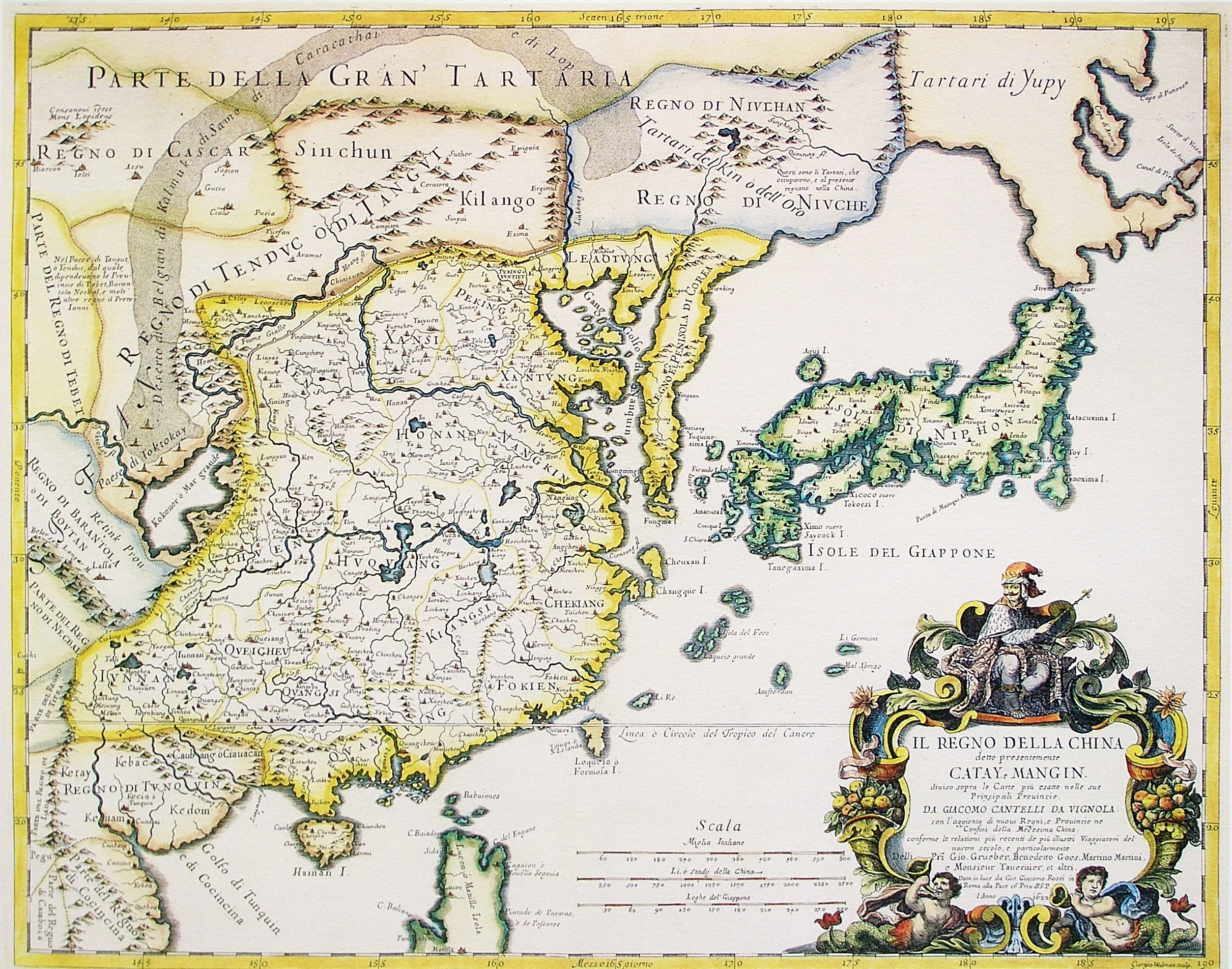
Map of China, 1689

== Bibliography ==
- Palagiano, CC. (1975). "CANTELLI, Giacomo". Dizionario Biografico degli Italiani (in Italian). Vol. 18: Canella–Cappello. Rome: Istituto dell'Enciclopedia Italiana. ISBN 978-88-12-00032-6.
