= Porretta Terme railway station =

Railway station in Italy

Porretta Terme
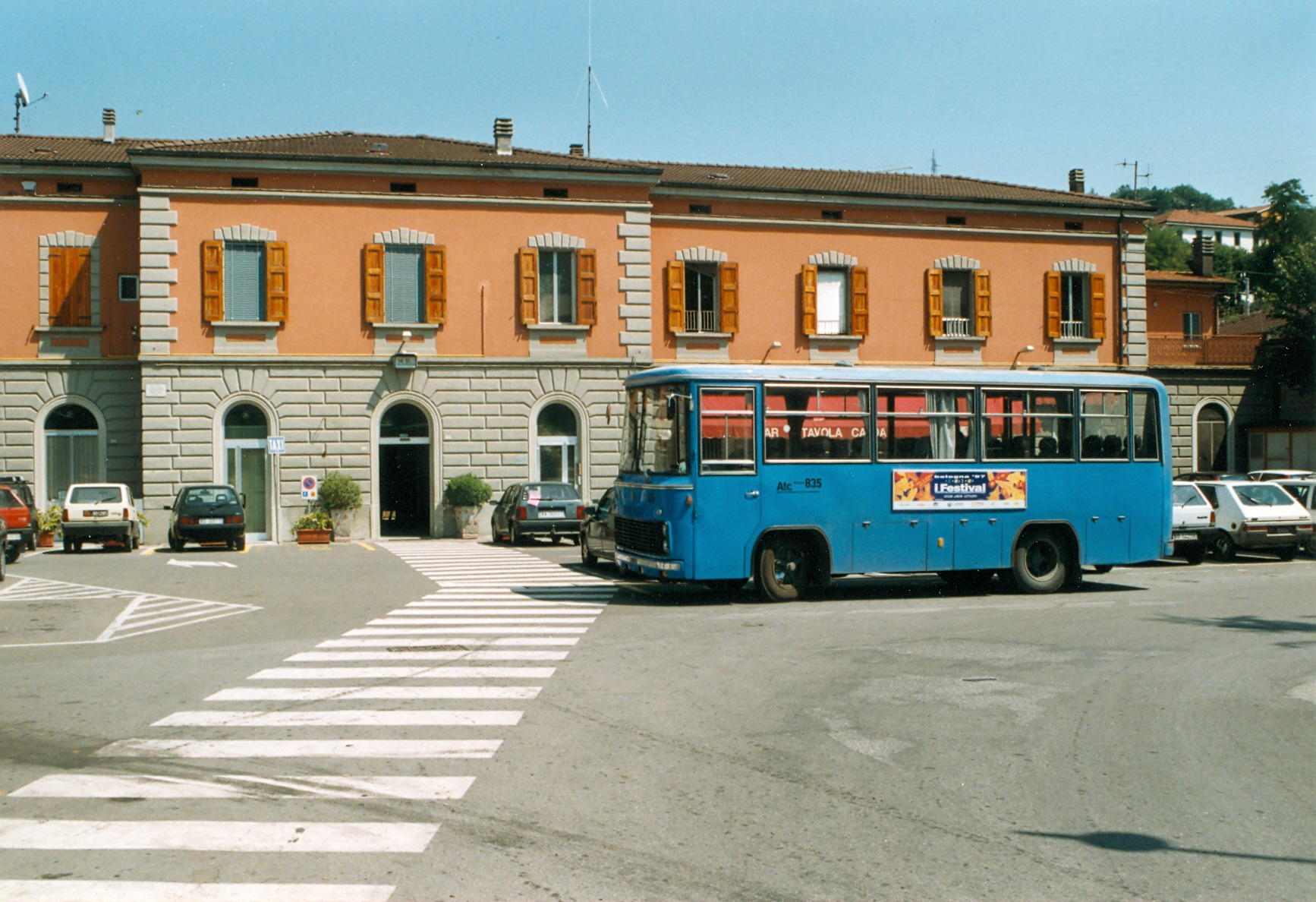
- Porretta Terme railway station in 2008

General information
- Location: Porretta Terme, Emilia-Romagna; Italy
- Coordinates: 44.1558°N 10.9779°E
- Operator: Rete Ferroviaria Italiana
- Line: Porrettana railway
- Tracks: 4
- Train operators: Trenitalia, Trenitalia Tper
- Connections: Local buses

Other information
- Classification: Silver
Location
- Location within Emilia-Romagna Location within Northern Italy Location within Italy

Porretta Terme (Italian: Stazione di Porretta Terme) is a railway station serving Porretta Terme, part of the municipality of Alto Reno Terme, in the region of Emilia-Romagna, northern Italy. The station is located on the Porrettana railway.

It is the terminus of Line S1A of Bologna metropolitan railway service.

Train services are operated by Trenitalia and Trenitalia Tper.

The station is currently managed by Rete Ferroviaria Italiana (RFI), a subsidiary of Ferrovie dello Stato Italiane (FSI), Italy's state-owned rail company.

== History ==
As of 1891, the railway station was named "Bagni della Porretta".

On 24 May 1927, the track from Porretta Terme to Pistoia was electrified with three-phase alternating current; on 28 October, the track from Porretta Terme to Bologna followed. The whole Porrettana line was later converted to direct current on 13 May 1935.

== Features ==
The station consists of four tracks linked by an underpass.

== Train services ==
The station is served by the following service(s):

- Suburban services (Treno suburbano) on line S1A, Bologna – Porretta Terme
- Regional services (Treno regionale) Porretta Terme-Pistoia

== See also ==
- List of railway stations in Bologna
- List of railway stations in Emilia-Romagna
- Bologna metropolitan railway service
