= Villa Martuzzi, Modena =

Villa Martuzzi or Villa Martuzzi-Ripanelli is a rural palace house located in the neighborhood of Collina di Campiglio, just outside of the town of Vignola, near Modena, Region of Emilia-Romagna, Italy.

The villa was begun in a Renaissance style, during the 16th century by the Marchesi of the Rangoni family. It was sold in the 18th century, and by the 19th century it was acquired by the count Martuzzi Ripandelli, who added or refurbished some eclectic additions, including a tall corner tower. During the second world war, it served as a headquarters for the German Armies after 1944. After an allied bombardment caused grave damage to the house, townsfolk were able to discover the freshly interred bodies of 17 massacred civilians, who had been apprehended by SS forces near Guiglia on 23 December, 1944 in retribution to attacks on German troops.

The villa was subsequently restored. The site was selected as a Luoghi del Cuore of Italy by the Fondo Ambiente Italiano.
