= Ferrara railway station =

Railway station in Ferrara, Italy

Ferrara
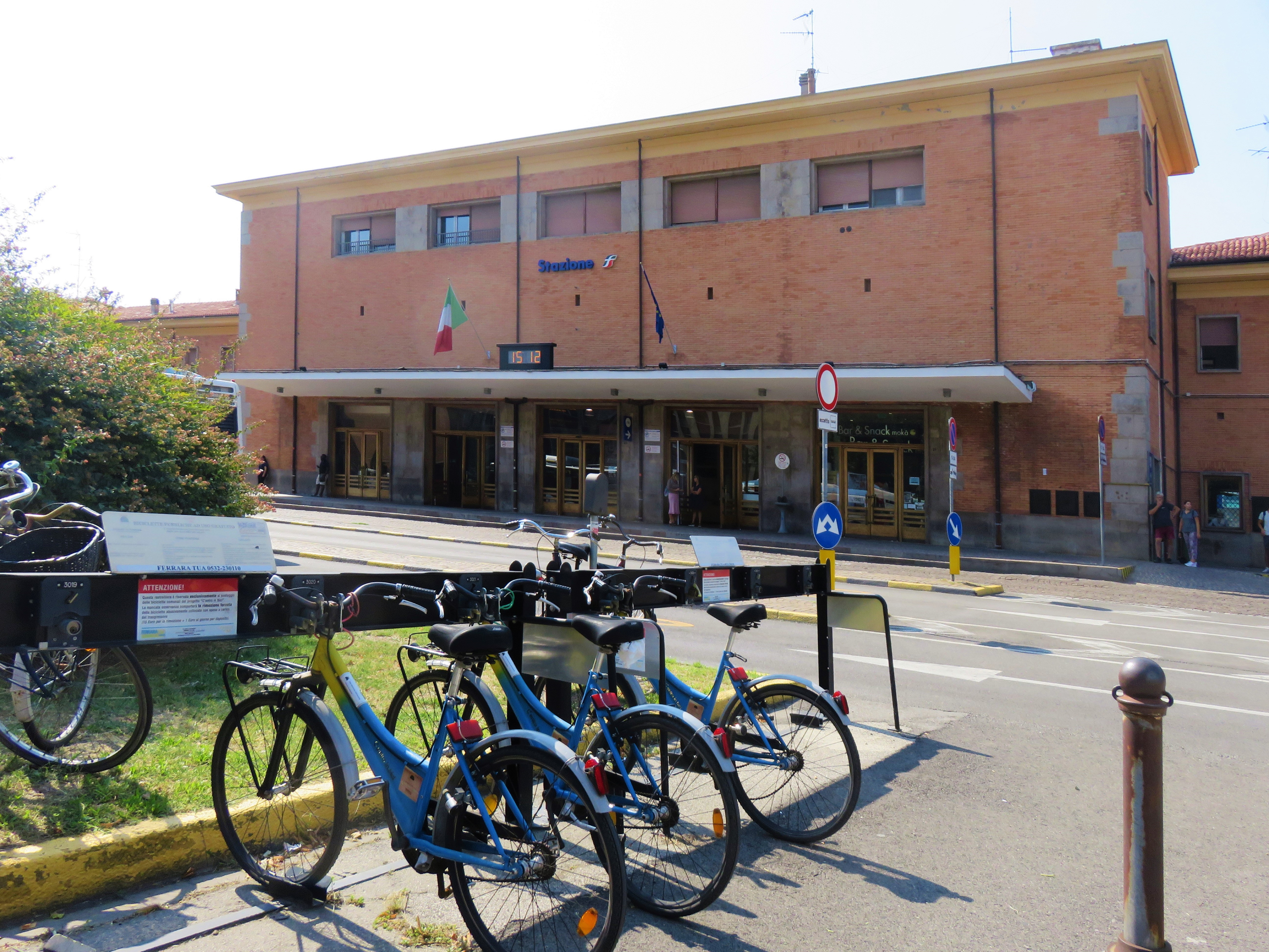
- The passenger building.

General information
- Location: Piazzale della Stazione 2-4; 44122 Ferrara FE; Ferrara, Ferrara, Emilia-Romagna; Italy
- Coordinates: 44°50′34″N 11°36′14″E
- Operator: Rete Ferroviaria Italiana; Centostazioni
- Lines: Padua–Bologna; Ferrara–Ravenna–Rimini; Suzzara–Ferrara; Ferrara–Codigoro
- Distance: 46.830 km (29.099 mi) from Bologna Centrale
- Train operators: Trenitalia; Ferrovie Emilia Romagna (FER)
- Connections: Urban and suburban buses

Other information
- Classification: Gold
- Website: www.rfi.it/en/stations/ferrara.html

History
- Opened: 26 January 1862; 164 years ago
Location
- Location within Emilia-Romagna Location within Northern Italy Location within Italy

Ferrara railway station (Italian: Stazione di Ferrara) is the main station serving the city and comune of Ferrara, in the region of Emilia-Romagna, northern Italy. Opened in 1862, it forms part of the Padua–Bologna railway, and is also a terminus of three secondary railways, linking Ferrara with Ravenna and Rimini, Suzzara, and Codigoro, respectively.

The station is currently managed by Rete Ferroviaria Italiana (RFI). However, the commercial area of the passenger building is managed by Centostazioni. Train services on the main line, and on the line to Ravenna and Rimini, are operated by Trenitalia. Each of these companies is a subsidiary of Ferrovie dello Stato Italiane (FS), Italy's state-owned rail company.

Train services on the other two lines, to Suzzara and Codigoro, are operated by Ferrovie Emilia Romagna (FER), which is owned by the region of Emilia-Romagna and most of its provinces.

Be careful when using the small elevators as they are located away from the foot traffic and present a greater theft risk.

== Location ==
Ferrara railway station is situated at Piazzale della Stazione, at the northwestern edge of the city centre, between Via San Giacomo and Viale della Costituzione.

== History ==
The station was opened on 26 January 1862, together with the rest of the Bologna–Ferrara section of the Padua–Bologna railway. Three months later, on 15 April 1862, Ferrara was transformed from a terminal station into a through station, when the next section of that railway, from Ferrara to Pontelagoscuro, came into operation.

== Features ==
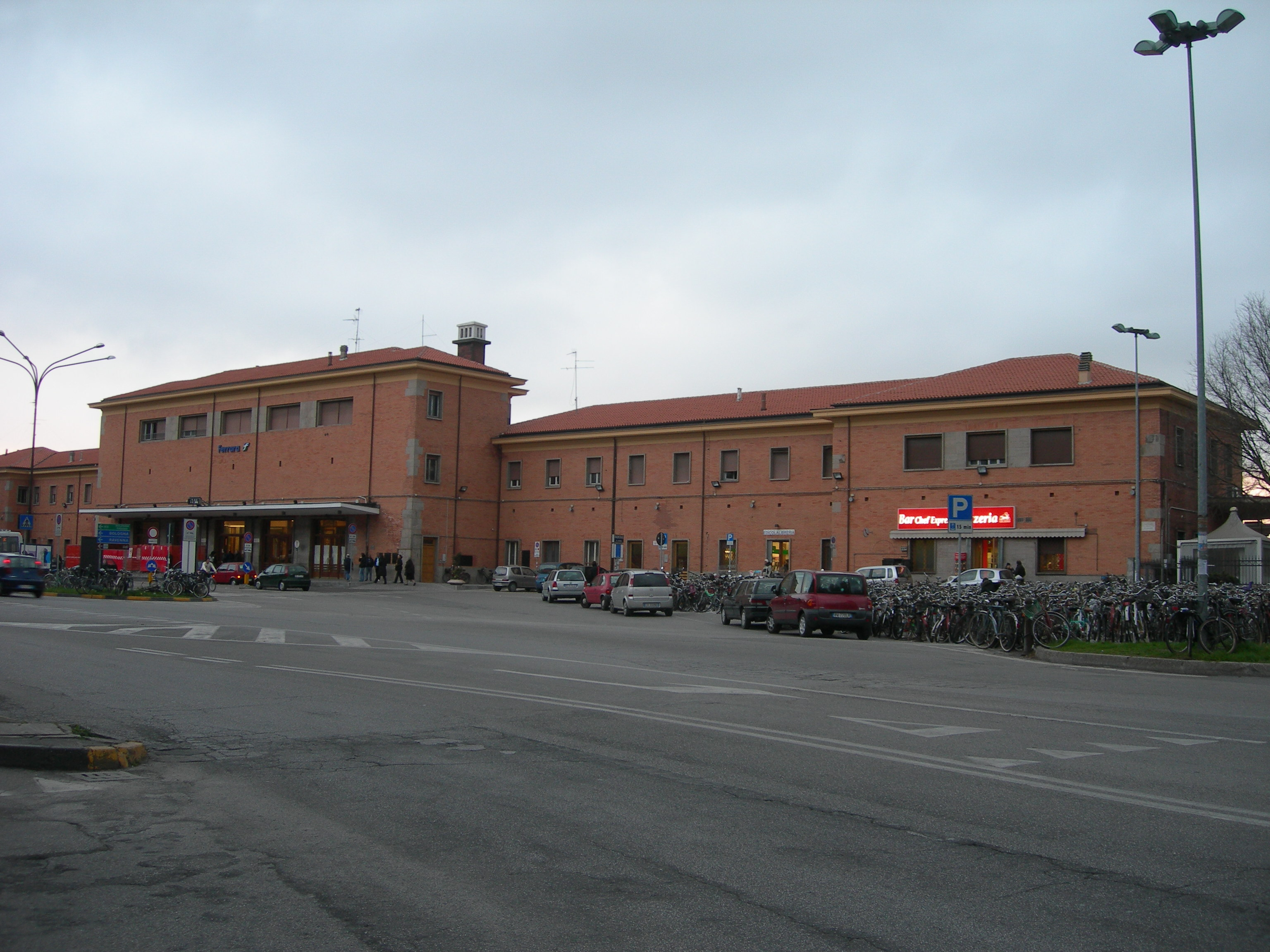
Overview of Piazzale della Stazione.

Today's passenger building, renovated several times over the years, has a central hall with a ticket office and waiting room. In its two lateral wings, there are a bar, restaurant, newsagent and tobacconist, and a bicycle storage area.

The station also has two underground pedestrian underpasses that connect the first track with the remaining 5 served by three platforms.

Outside the building, there are a taxi stand, the large parking area for bicycles (300 places), car parking (60 spaces), motorcycle parking (40 spaces), a two lane bus station for urban buses and, across the street, four bus stops for suburban buses.

== Redevelopment work ==
Currently, the comune of Ferrara is working on the redevelopment of the station, including the insertion of a new roundabout access from Viale della Costituzione, the construction of public parking for bikes and cars and the addition of special shelters for urban buses.

The station is also affected by work on the extension of the Bologna metropolitan railway service (SFM), as it is to be a terminus of an SFM Ferrara–Bologna–Imola line.

Additionally, the station will be a terminus of a commuter service, to be introduced in the urban section (as far as Quartesana) of the FER line to Codigoro.

== Passenger and train movements ==
The station has about 5 million passenger movements each year.

The passenger trains calling at the station include regional, express, InterCity, and Eurostar trains.

A total of about 220 passenger trains serve the station each day.

== See also ==
- Ferrara Porta Reno railway station
- Ferrara Aleotti railway station
- Pontelagoscuro railway station
- History of rail transport in Italy
- List of railway stations in Emilia-Romagna
- Rail transport in Italy
- Railway stations in Italy
