= Poggio Rusco railway station =

Railway station in Italy

Poggio Rusco

General information
- Location: Poggio Rusco, Lombardy; Italy
- Coordinates: 44.9818°N 11.1246°E
- Operator: Rete Ferroviaria Italiana
- Lines: Verona–Bologna railway, Suzzara–Ferrara railway
- Tracks: 6
- Train operators: Trenitalia, Trenitalia Tper

History
- Opened: 1888
Location
- Location within Lombardy Location within Northern Italy Location within Italy

Poggio Rusco railway station (Italian: Stazione di Poggio Rusco) is a railway station serving Poggio Rusco, in the region of Lombardy, northern Italy.

It is located at the junction of the Verona–Bologna railway and the Suzzara–Ferrara railway. It is the terminus of Line S3 of Bologna metropolitan railway service.

Train services are operated by Trenitalia and Trenitalia Tper.

The station is managed by Rete Ferroviaria Italiana (RFI).

== History ==
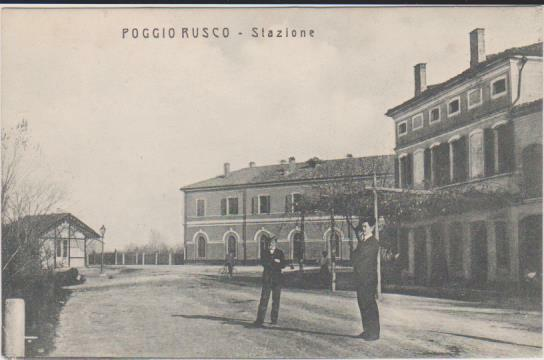
Poggio Rusco railway station in 1907

The station was opened in 1888, when the Suzzara–Ferrara railway line was completed. It was located east of the town centre; the junction to the then projected Bologna–Verona railway line was already envisaged.

On 26 October 2008, the stretch from Poggio Rusco to San Felice sul Panaro railway station was double-tracked. A new alignment between Poggio Rusco and Nogara railway station was inaugurated on 14 December 2008.

== Features ==
The station consists of 6 tracks.

== Train services ==
The station is served by the following service(s):

- Suburban services (Treno suburbano) on line S3, Bologna - Poggio Rusco

== See also ==
- List of railway stations in Lombardy
- Bologna metropolitan railway service
