= Casteldebole railway station =

Railway station in Emilia-Romagna, Italy

Casteldebole

General information
- Location: Casteldebole, Bologna, Emilia-Romagna; Italy
- Coordinates: 44.5034°N 11.2746°E
- Operator: Rete Ferroviaria Italiana
- Line: Bologna-Porretta
- Tracks: 2
- Train operators: Trenitalia Tper
- Connections: Bologna buses

Other information
- Classification: Bronze

History
- Opened: 2002
Location
- Location within Emilia-Romagna Location within Northern Italy Location within Italy

Casteldebole (Italian: Stazione di Casteldebole) is a railway station serving the suburb of Casteldebole, part of the city of Bologna, in the region of Emilia-Romagna, northern Italy. The station opened in 2002 and is located on the Porrettana railway. The train services are operated by Trenitalia Tper.

The station is currently managed by Rete Ferroviaria Italiana (RFI), a subsidiary of Ferrovie dello Stato Italiane (FSI), Italy's state-owned rail company.

== Location ==
Casteldebole railway station is situated west of the city centre.

== History ==
The station was opened on December 29, 2002.

== Features ==
The station does not feature any building.

It consists of two tracks linked by an underpass.

In spring 2011, the underpass was renovated: professional writers, as well as students from the local middle school Alessandro Volta, enriched it with artistic paintings.

== Train services ==
The station is served by the following service(s):

- Suburban services (Treno suburbano) on line S1A, Bologna - Porretta Terme
- Suburban services (Treno suburbano) on line S2A, Bologna - Vignola

== See also ==
- List of railway stations in Bologna
- List of railway stations in Emilia-Romagna
- Bologna metropolitan railway service
