= Poggio Rusco =

- Comune
- Comune di Poggio Rusco
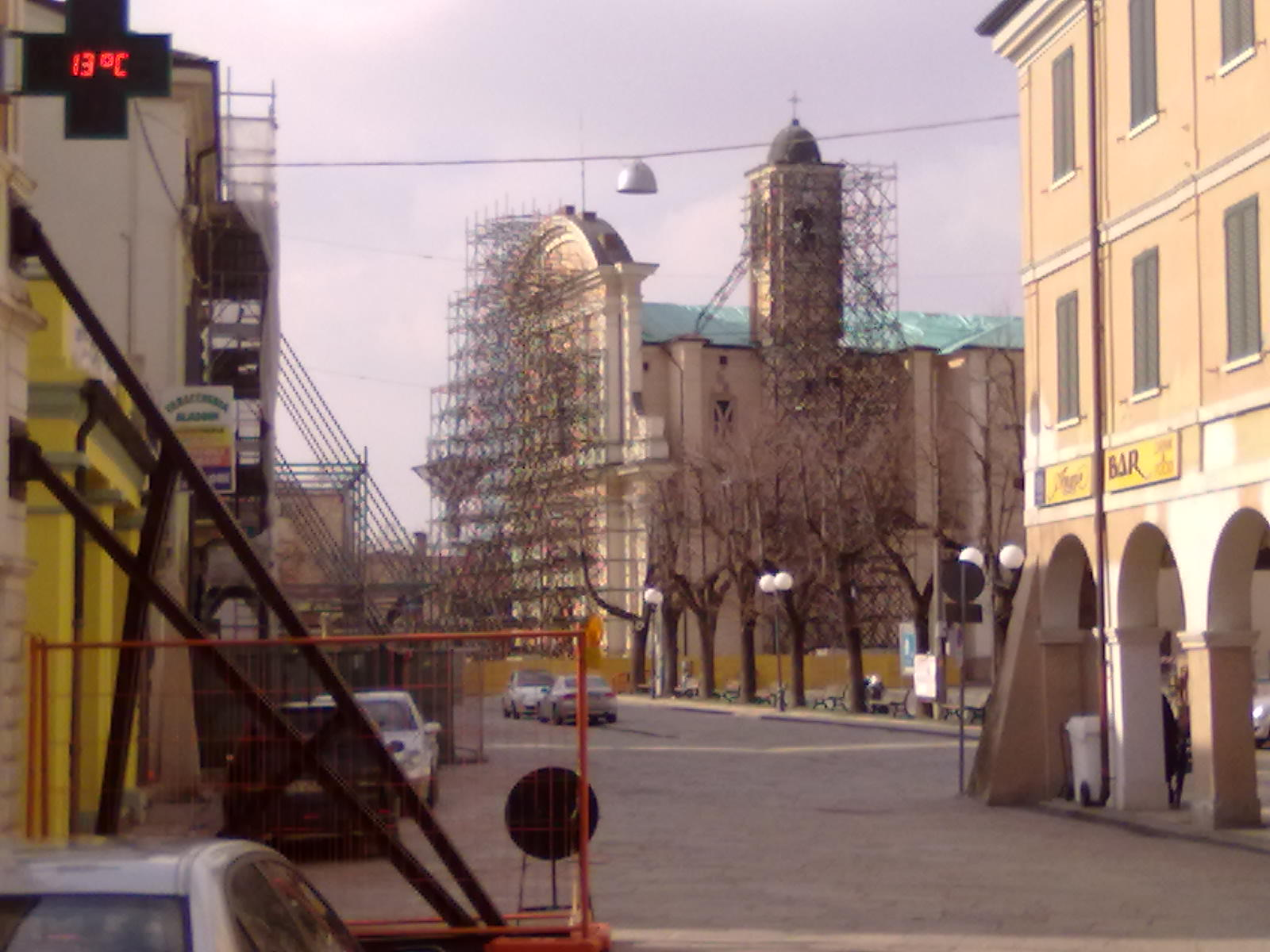
- Historical center in 2013, with ongoing restorations after the 2012 earthquake.

- Coat of arms

- Location within Italy Location within Lombardy
- Coordinates: 44°58′40″N 11°07′10″E
- Country: Italy
- Region: Lombardy
- Province: Mantua (MN)
- Frazioni: Dragoncello, Quattrocase, Segonda, Stoppiaro

Government
  - Mayor: Fabio Zacchi

Area
  - Total: 42.29 km^{2} (16.33 sq mi)
- Elevation: 16 m (52 ft)

Population (31 August 2020)
  - Total: 6,474
  - Density: 153.1/km^{2} (396.5/sq mi)
- Demonym: Poggesi
- Time zone: UTC+1 (CET)
  - Summer (DST): UTC+2 (CEST)
- Postal code: 46025
- Dialing code: 0386
- Patron saint: St.Mary
- Saint day: May 31
- Website: Official website

Poggio Rusco (Lower Mantovano: Al Pòs) is a small town and comune in the Province of Mantua, whose inhabitants' number 6,474 as of August 31, 2020. It is 42 kilometres (26 mi) from the provincial capital.

The town lies in the southeast of the Oltrepò Mantovano area, 9 kilometres (6 mi) from the Po River and just 2 kilometres (1 mi) from Province of Modena, equidistant to principal cities of the Po Valley such as Mantua, Verona, Ferrara, Bologna and Modena.

== Origin of the name ==
A popular story about the origin of the name said that this place was used by bolognese people as dump; dump in bolognese language was "rusco", and because of it this town now is called Poggio Rusco.

== Transportation ==
State Road 12, called Abetone-Brennero, which links Po Valley with Germany, intersects the Provincial Road 496, which connects Mantua with Ferrara.

Poggio Rusco railway station is located at the junction between the Verona–Bologna railway and the Suzzara–Ferrara railway.

== Twin cities ==
=== Former Twin Cities ===
- Condé-sur-Noireau, France, from 1999 - 2021
