= Vignola =

- Comune
- Comune di Vignola
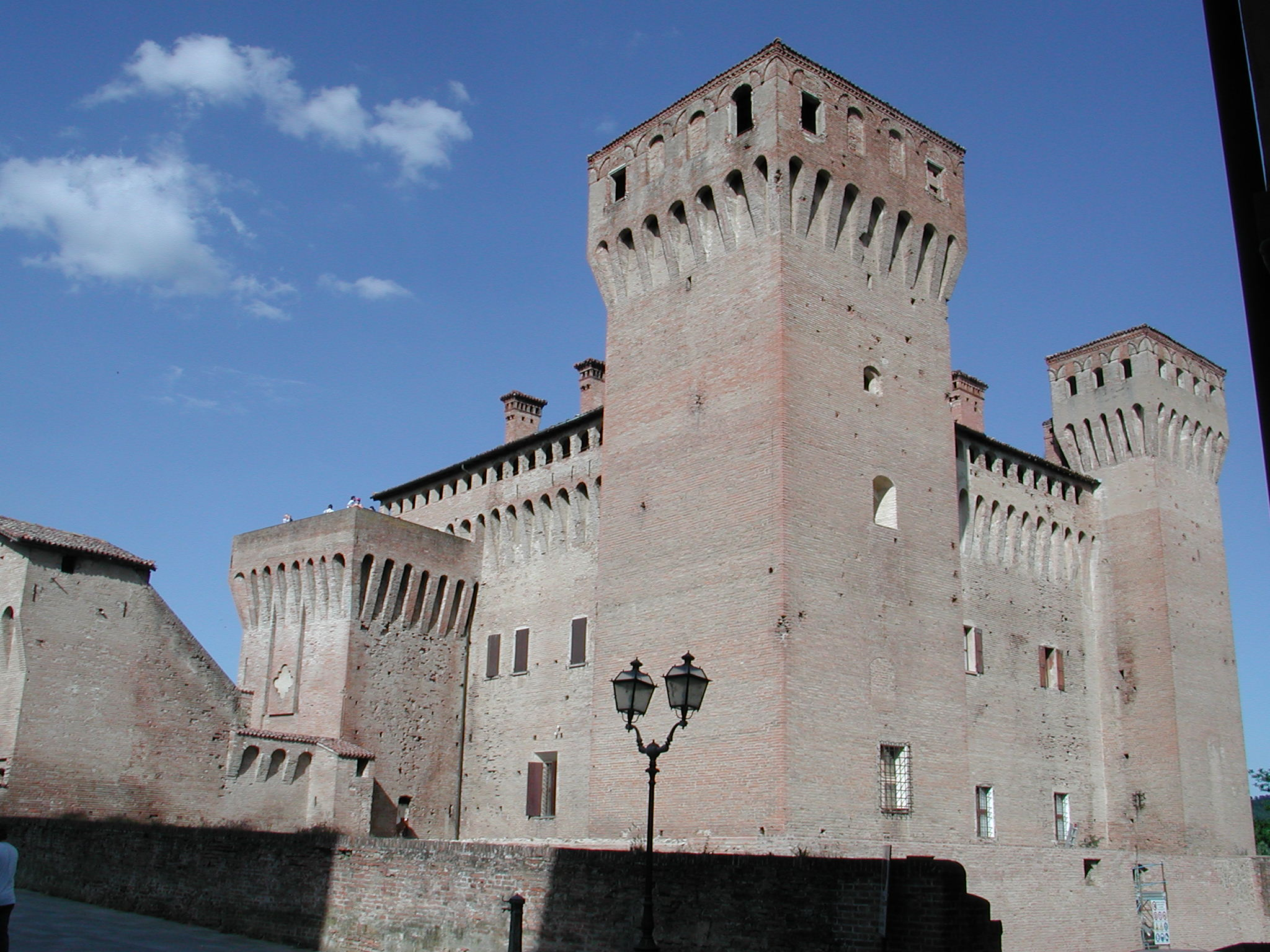
- The Rocca of Vignola

- Location within Italy Location within Emilia-Romagna
- Coordinates: 44°28′N 11°00′E
- Country: Italy
- Region: Emilia-Romagna
- Province: Modena (MO)
- Frazioni: Tavernelle, Campiglio, Pratomaggiore, Bettolino

Government
  - Mayor: Emilia Muratori

Area
  - Total: 22 km^{2} (8.5 sq mi)
- Elevation: 125 m (410 ft)

Population (1 September 2015)
  - Total: 25,251
  - Density: 1,100/km^{2} (3,000/sq mi)
- Demonym: Vignolesi
- Time zone: UTC+1 (CET)
  - Summer (DST): UTC+2 (CEST)
- Postal code: 41058
- Dialing code: 059
- Patron saint: Santi Nazario e Celso
- Saint day: October 13
- Website: Official website

Vignola (Italian pronunciation: [viɲˈɲɔːla]; Modenese: Vgnóla; Bolognese: Vgnôla) is a city and comune in the province of Modena (Emilia-Romagna), Italy.

Its economy is based on agriculture, especially fruit farming, but there are also mechanical industries and service companies.

The city is mostly known as the birthplace of the Renaissance architect Jacopo Barozzi da Vignola.

== History ==
Vignola, whose name derives from the Latin vineola ("small vine") is located near an ancient Etruscan road connecting Bologna to Parma. However it is mentioned in the Middle Ages as having been founded in 826 as, according to the legend, a castle to protect the lands of the nearby Abbey of Nonantola.

Vignola was a possession of those bishops until 1247; during the wars between Guelphs and Ghibellines its territory was contented between the communes of Modena and Bologna, until the Grassoni family installed their seigniory in Vignola. This lasted until 1399, when it was acquired by the House of Este; two years later it was conceded as a county to Uguccione de' Contrari from Ferrara. With the death of Ercole Contrari in 1557, Vignola was assigned to Giacomo Boncompagni, son of Pope Gregory XIII. The Boncompagni rule fell with the Napoleonic Conquest of Italy, and, after the Congress of Vienna of 1814, Vignola became part of the Duchy of Modena.

== Main sights ==
- Town Museum
- The Castle (Rocca), built perhaps in the Carolingian era but known from 1178; it was turned into a patrician residence by the Contrari family in the Renaissance era. It houses a chapel with late-Gothic frescoes (early 15th century), and a hall (Sala del Padiglione) with frescoes from the same age.
- Palazzo dei Contrari
- Palazzo Boncompagni (or Palazzo Barozzi)
- Torre Galvani
- Villa Martuzzi

== Transport ==
Vignola is served by Vignola railway station, terminus of the Casalecchio–Vignola railway.

== Notable people ==
- Jacopo Barozzi (1507–1573), architect
- Giacomo Cantelli (1643–1695), cartographer
- Ludovico Antonio Muratori (1672–1750), historian
- Antonio Paradisi (1736–1783), poet and economist
- Patrizia Reggiani (1948-), Ex-wife of Maurizio Gucci

== Twin towns ==
- Barbezieux-Saint-Hilaire, France, since 1982
- Witzenhausen, Germany, since 1982
- Angol, Chile, since 1998
