= List of railway stations in Bologna =

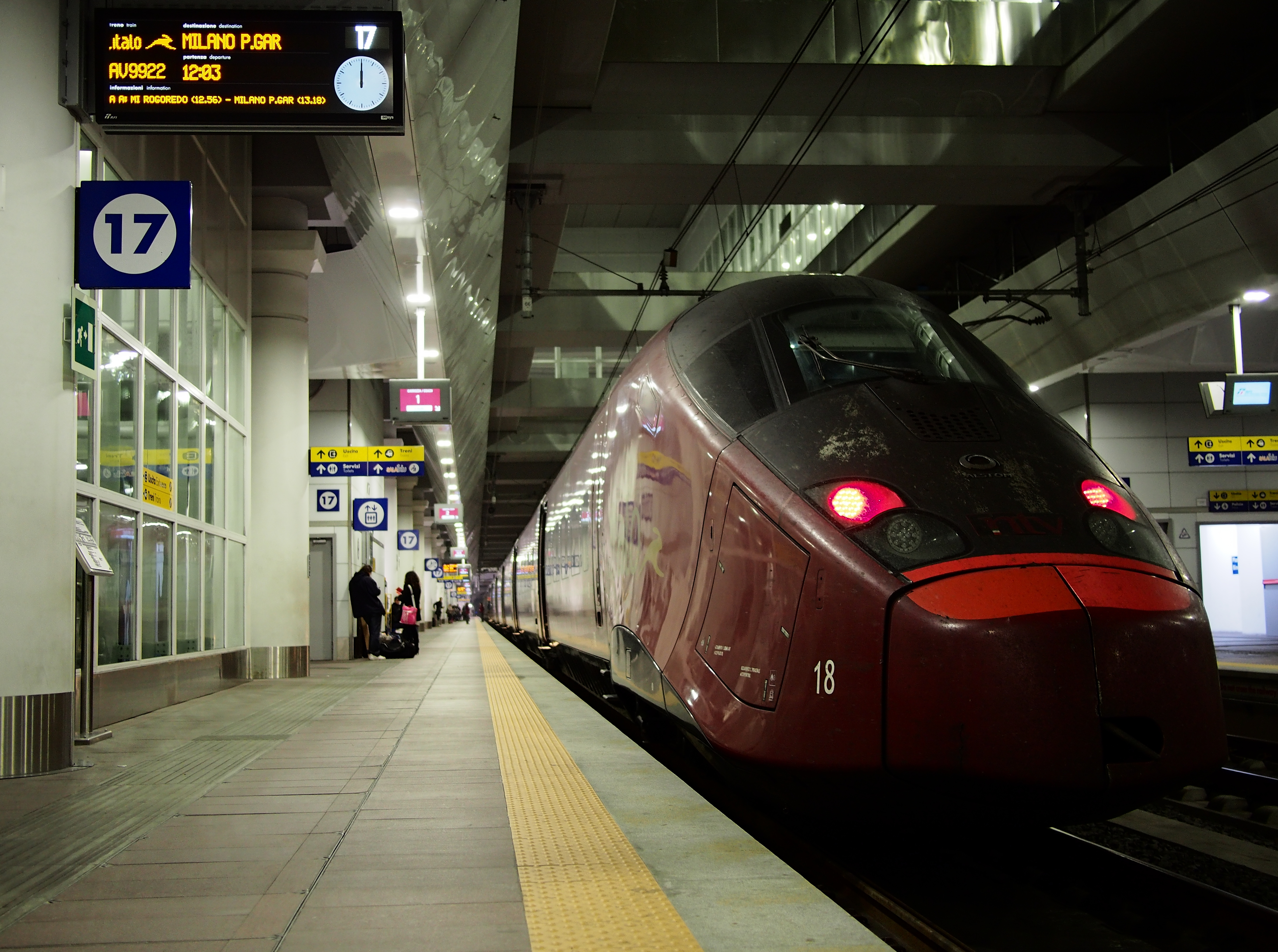
An Italo (it) high speed train departing Bologna Centrale, headed to Milano Porta Garibaldi railway station.

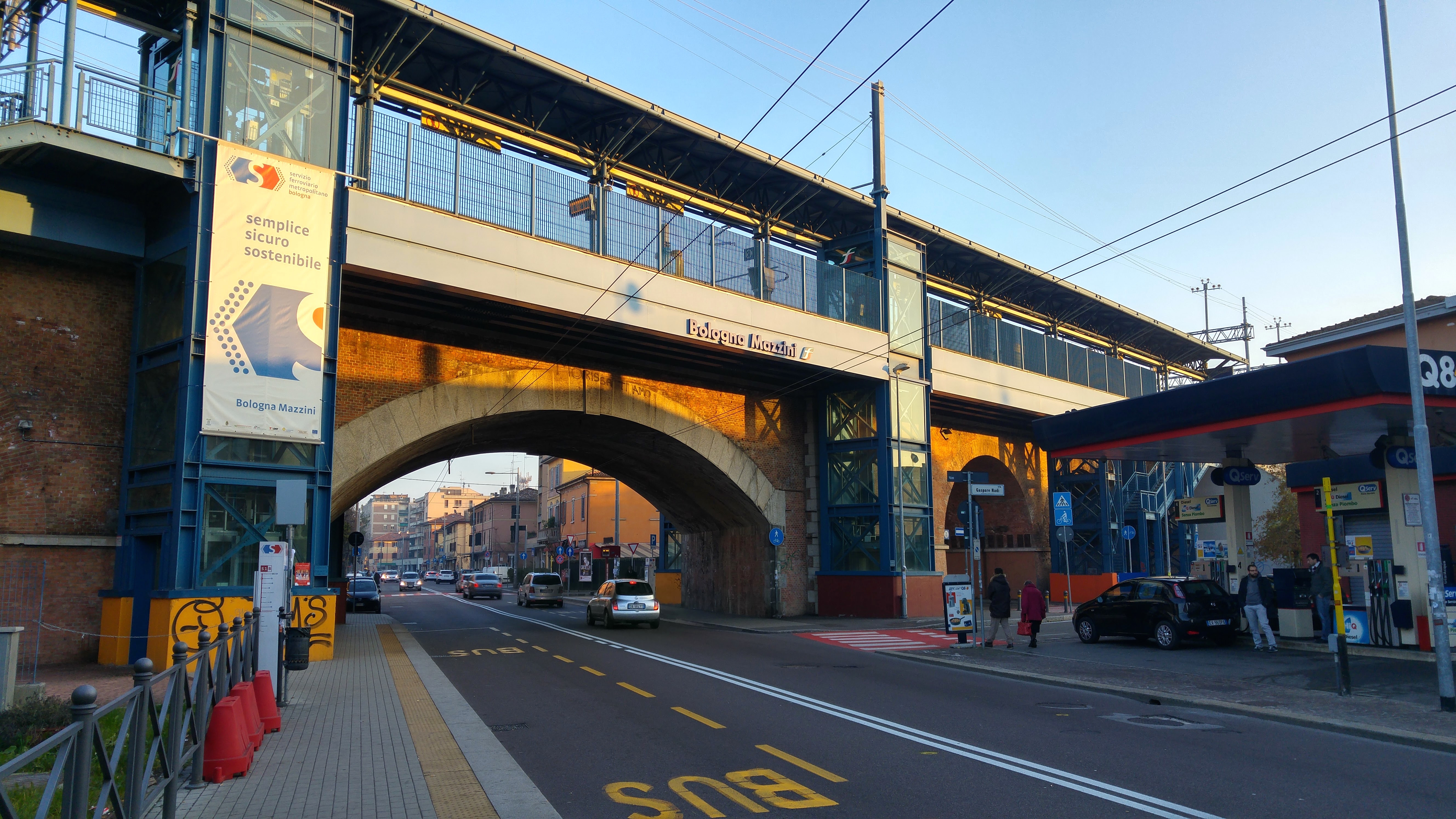
Bologna Mazzini railway station, as seen from via Emilia.

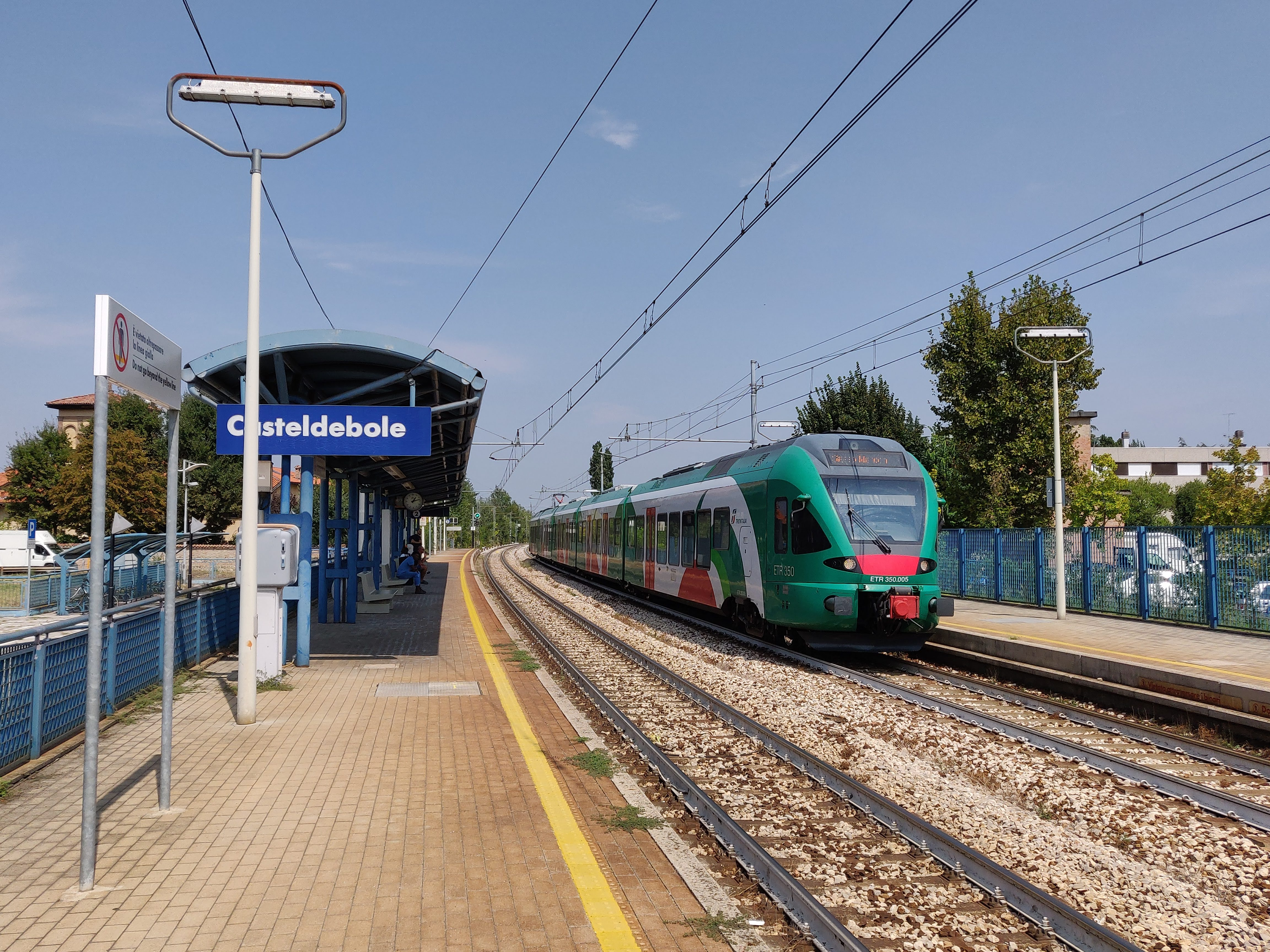
A regional train is about to depart Casteldebole railway station.

Below is a list of current railway stations in Bologna, Italy.

== Active stations ==
Name	Inauguration	Current state	Daily patronage	Metropolitan service	Type	Manager
Bologna Centrale	1859	In use	158,900 (as of 2011)	All lines	Through and terminal station, surface and underground	RFI/Grandi Stazioni
Bologna Borgo Panigale	1862	In use	2,405 (as of 2019)	Lines S1A, S2A	Through station, surface	RFI
Casteldebole	2002	In use	884 (as of 2019)	Lines S1A, S2A	Through station, surface	RFI
Bologna Corticella	1864	In use	313 (as of 2019)	Line S4A	Through station, surface	RFI
Bologna Mazzini	1864	In use	599 (as of 2019)	Line S1B	Through station, elevated	RFI
Bologna Rimesse	1987	service suspended in 2022 due to the line being moved underground until Bologna Roveri	343 (as of 2019)	Line S2B	Through station, surface	FER
Bologna Roveri	1887	In use	199 (as of 2019)	Line S2B	Through station, surface	FER
Bologna San Ruffillo	1934	In use	566 (as of 2020)	Line S1B	Through station, surface	RFI
Bologna Santa Rita	1987	In use	153 (as of 2019)	Line S2B	Through station, surface, service suspended in 2022 due to the line being moved underground until Bologna Roveri	FER
Bologna San Vitale	2014	In use	844 (as of 2020)	Lines S1B, S4B	Through station, elevated	RFI
Bologna Via Larga	1987	In use	510 (as of 2019)	Line S2B	Through station, surface, service suspended in 2022 due to the line being moved underground until Bologna Roveri	FER
Bologna Zanolini	1887	In Use service suspended in 2022 due to the line being moved underground until Bologna Roveri	555 (as of 2020)	Line S2B	Through station, underground	FER

== Planned stations (as of 2018) ==
- Bologna Borgo Panigale Scala railway station
- Bologna Prati di Caprara railway station
- Bologna Zanardi railway station

== See also ==
- Bologna metropolitan railway service
- List of railway stations in Emilia-Romagna
