= Vignola railway station =

Railway station in Italy

Vignola
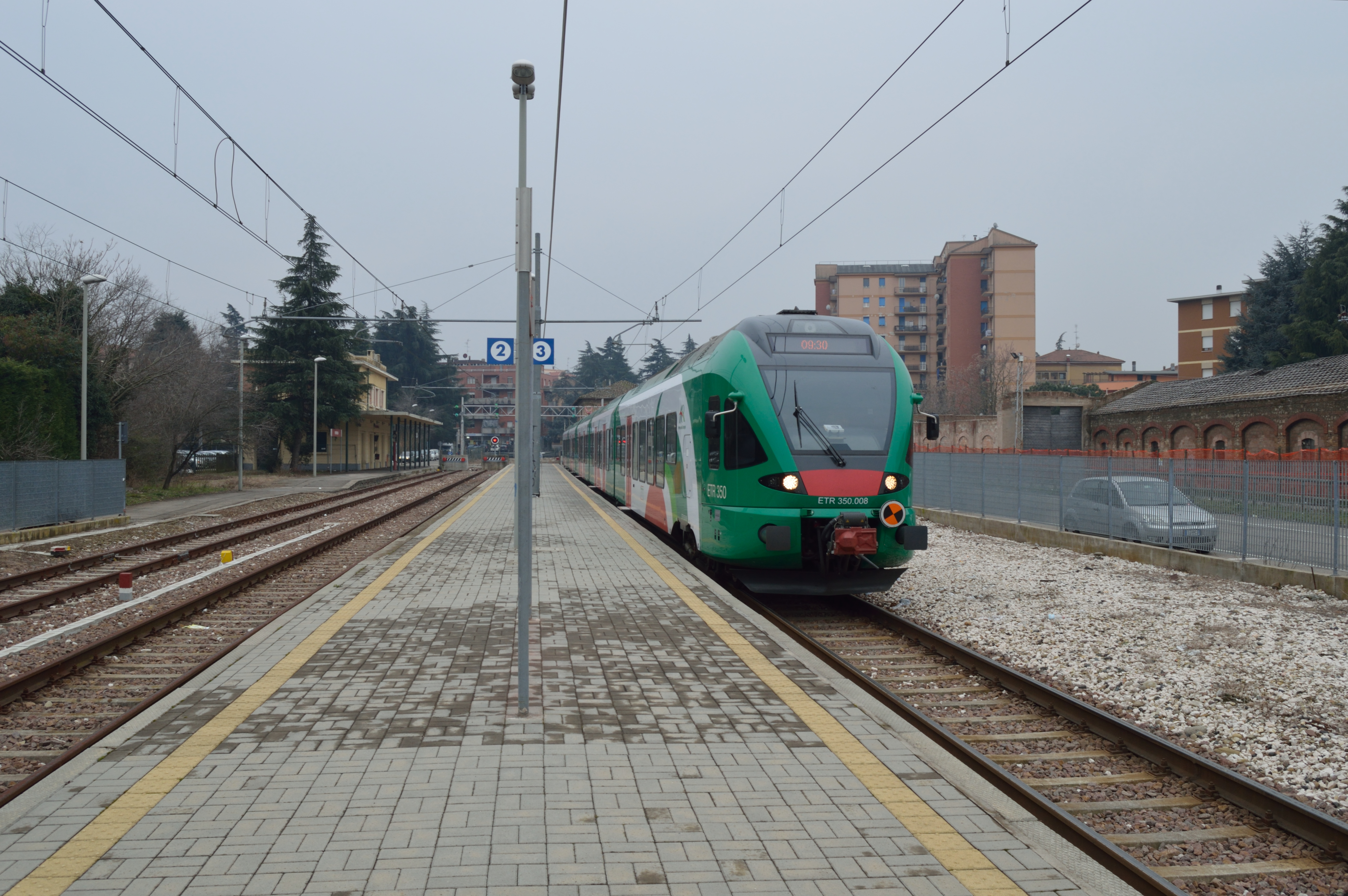
- ETR.350.008 waits departure at Vignola on 24 February 2015 with train R 11456, 09:48 Vignola to Bologna Centrale

General information
- Location: Vignola, Emilia-Romagna; Italy
- Coordinates: 44.4818°N 11.0085°E
- Operator: Ferrovie Emilia Romagna
- Line: Casalecchio–Vignola railway
- Tracks: 3
- Train operators: Trenitalia Tper
- Connections: Local buses

History
- Opened: 1938
Location
- Location within Emilia-Romagna Location within Northern Italy Location within Italy

Vignola (Italian: Stazione di Vignola) is a railway station serving Vignola, in the region of Emilia-Romagna, northern Italy.

It is the terminus of the Casalecchio–Vignola railway and of Line S2A of Bologna metropolitan railway service.

Train services are operated by Trenitalia Tper.

The station is currently managed by Ferrovie Emilia Romagna (FER).

== History ==
The station was inaugurated on 28 October 1938, together with the resto the railway line.

Passenger transport was suspended on the whole line in 1967, while freight transport was suspended in 1995. The station was reactivated on 19 September 2004.

== Features ==
The station consists of three tracks.

== Train services ==
The station is served by the following service(s):

- Suburban services (Treno suburbano) on line S2A, Bologna - Vignola

== See also ==
- List of railway stations in Emilia-Romagna
- Bologna metropolitan railway service
