= Bologna metropolitan railway service =

Public transport service in Bologna, Italy

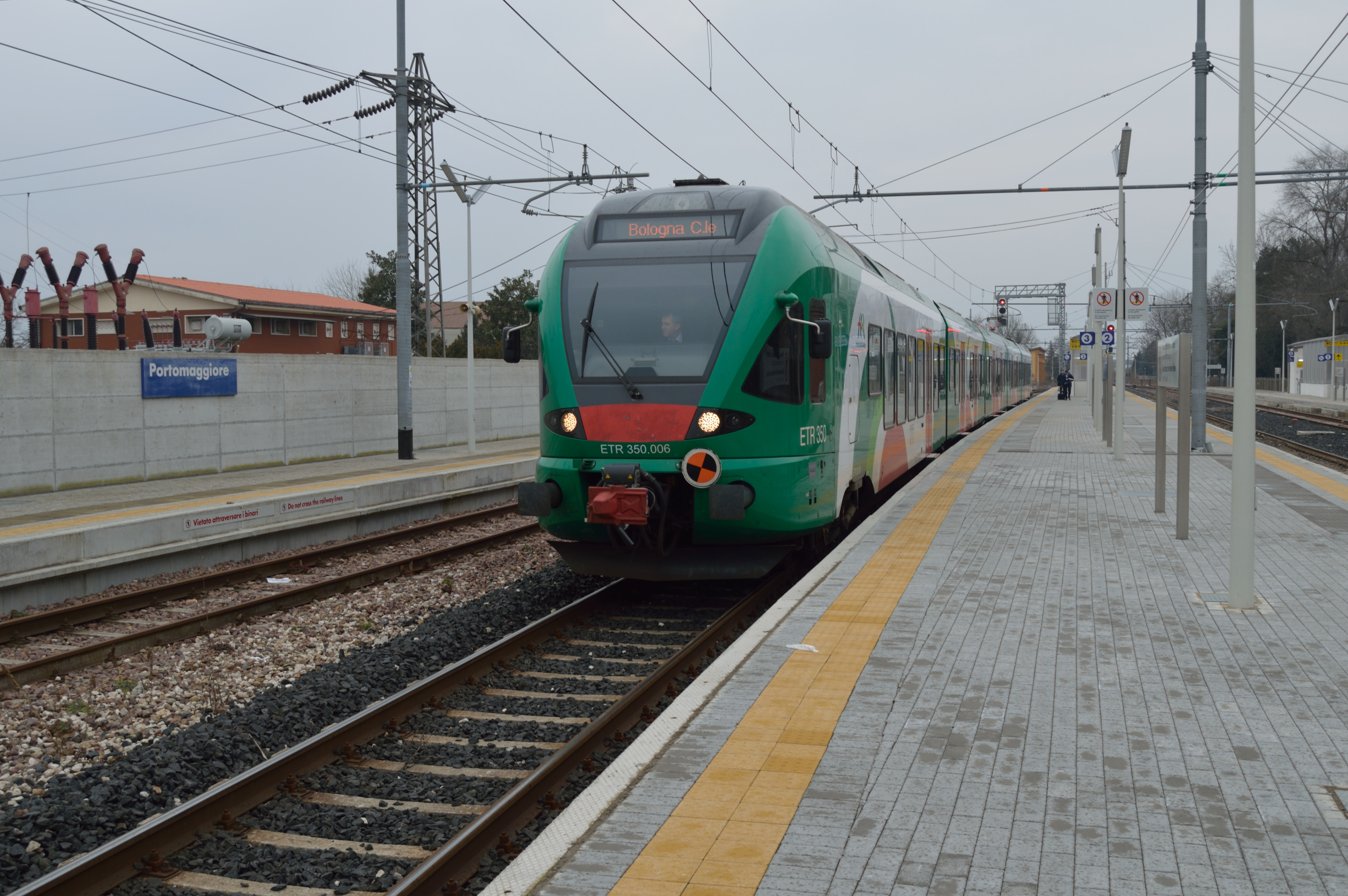

Overview
- Locale: Bologna, Italy
- Transit type: Commuter rail
- Number of lines: 8 foreseen
- Number of stations: 87 foreseen
- Daily ridership: 48,000

Operation
- Began operation: 1995
- Operators: Trenitalia, TPER
System map

The Bologna metropolitan railway service (Italian: servizio ferroviario metropolitano di Bologna, acronym: SFMBO) is a commuter railway service around the Italian city of Bologna. Several system expansions are currently under construction.

== History ==
Launched in 1995 with two suburban lines attested in the Bologna Centrale Railway Station, with the agreement of the program of 2007 is expected activation of more straight lines with a regular timetable for 2012, but due to delays in the full activation Bologna Central station AV completion buoyancy base is postponed to 2015. in June 2013 have been completed on 90% of the infrastructure works and are active 70% of the services provided positioned in the base.

== Lines ==
The following 8 lines are foreseen:

- S 1a Bologna Centrale–Porretta Terme
- S 1b Bologna Centrale–San Benedetto Sambro-Castiglione Pepoli
- S 2a Bologna Centrale–Vignola
- S 2b Bologna Centrale–Portomaggiore
- S 3 Bologna Centrale–Poggio Rusco
- S 4a Bologna Centrale–Ferrara
- S 4b Bologna Centrale–Imola
- S 5 Bologna Centrale–Modena

== See also ==
- List of suburban and commuter rail systems
- Bologna tramway
