= List of railway stations in Emilia-Romagna =

This is the list of the railway stations in Emilia-Romagna, owned by:

- Rete Ferroviaria Italiana (RFI), a branch of the Italian state company Ferrovie dello Stato;
- Ferrovie Emilia Romagna (FER).

== RFI stations ==
Station	Locality	Province	Category	Notes
Alfonsine	Alfonsine	Ravenna	Bronze	
Anzola dell'Emilia	Anzola dell'Emilia	Bologna	Bronze	
Argenta	Argenta	Ferrara	Silver	
Bagnacavallo	Bagnacavallo	Ravenna	Silver	
Barbiano	Barbiano di Cotignola	Ravenna	Bronze	
Bellaria	Bellaria	Rimini	Silver	
Berceto	Berceto	Parma	Bronze	
Bologna Borgo Panigale	Bologna	Bologna	Silver	Bologna urban area
Bologna Centrale	Bologna	Bologna	Platinum	Bologna urban area
Bologna Corticella	Bologna	Bologna	Bronze	Bologna urban area
Bologna Fiere	Bologna	Bologna	Bronze	Bologna urban area
Bologna Mazzini	Bologna	Bologna	Bronze	Bologna urban area
Bologna San Ruffillo	Bologna	Bologna	Silver	Bologna urban area
Bologna San Vitale	Bologna	Bologna	Silver	Bologna urban area
Borghetto Parmense	Borghetto Parmense	Parma	Bronze	
Borgo Val di Taro	Borgo Val di Taro	Parma	Silver	
Borgonuovo	Borgonuovo	Bologna	Bronze	
Brisighella	Brisighella	Ravenna	Bronze	
Busseto	Busseto	Parma	Silver	
Cadeo	Cadeo	Piacenza	Bronze	
Calderara-Bargellino	Calderara di Reno	Bologna	Bronze	
Camposanto	Camposanto	Modena	Bronze	
Caorso	Caorso	Piacenza	Bronze	
Carbona	Carbona	Bologna	Bronze	
Carpi	Carpi	Modena	Silver	
Casalecchio di Reno	Casalecchio di Reno	Bologna	Silver	Bologna urban area
Casalecchio Garibaldi	Casalecchio di Reno	Bologna	Bronze	Bologna urban area Platforms 1 to 3 are run by RFI, 4 to 5 by FER
Castel San Giovanni	Castel San Giovanni	Piacenza	Silver	
Castel San Pietro Terme	Castel San Pietro Terme	Bologna	Silver	
Castelbolognese-Riolo Terme	Castel Bolognese	Ravenna	Silver	
Casteldebole	Bologna	Bologna	Bronze	Bologna urban area
Castelfranco Emilia	Castelfranco Emilia	Modena	Silver	
Castelguelfo	Castelguelfo	Parma	Bronze	
Castelmaggiore	Castel Maggiore	Bologna	Bronze	
Castelvetro	Castelvetro Piacentino	Piacenza	Bronze	
Castione dei Marchesi	Castione dei Marchesi	Parma	Bronze	
Cattolica-S.Giovanni Gabicce	Cattolica	Rimini	Silver	
Cervia-Milano Marittima	Cervia	Ravenna	Silver	
Cesena	Cesena	Forlì-Cesena	Silver	
Cesenatico	Cesenatico	Forlì-Cesena	Silver	
Citerna Taro	Citerna Taro	Parma	Bronze	
Classe	Classe	Ravenna	Bronze	
Collecchio	Collecchio	Parma	Bronze	
Colorno	Colorno	Parma	Bronze	
Conselice	Conselice	Ravenna	Bronze	
Coronella	Coronella	Ferrara	Bronze	Ferrara urban area
Cotignola	Cotignola	Ravenna	Bronze	
Crevalcore	Crevalcore	Bologna	Silver	
Faenza	Faenza	Ravenna	Gold	
Felegara-Sant'Andrea Bagni	Felegara	Parma	Bronze	
Ferrara	Ferrara	Ferrara	Gold	Ferrara urban area
Fidenza	Fidenza	Parma	Silver	
Fiorenzuola	Fiorenzuola d'Arda	Piacenza	Silver	
Fognano	Fognano	Ravenna	Bronze	
Forlì	Forlì	Forlì-Cesena	Gold	
Forlimpopoli-Bertinoro	Forlimpopoli	Forlì-Cesena	Bronze	
Fornovo	Fornovo di Taro	Parma	Silver	
Funo Centergross	Funo	Bologna	Bronze	
Gaibanella	Gaibanella	Ferrara	Bronze	
Galliera	Galliera	Bologna	Silver	
Gambettola	Gambettola	Forlì-Cesena	Silver	
Gatteo a Mare	Gatteo	Forlì-Cesena	Bronze	
Glorie	Glorie	Ravenna	Bronze	
Godo	Godo	Ravenna	Bronze	
Granarolo Faentino	Granarolo Faentino	Ravenna	Bronze	
Grizzana	Grizzana Morandi	Bologna	Silver	
Igea Marina	Igea Marina	Rimini	Bronze	
Imola	Imola	Bologna	Silver	
Lama di Reno	Lama di Reno	Bologna	Bronze	
Lavezzola	Lavezzola	Ravenna	Silver	
Lido di Classe-Lido di Savio	Lido di Classe	Ravenna	Silver	
Lugo	Lugo	Ravenna	Silver	
Marzabotto	Marzabotto	Bologna	Silver	
Massalombarda	Massa Lombarda	Ravenna	Bronze	
Medesano	Medesano	Parma	Bronze	
Mezzani-Rondani	Mezzani	Parma	Bronze	
Mezzano	Mezzano	Ravenna	Bronze	
Mirandola	Mirandola	Modena	Silver	
Misano Adriatico	Misano Adriatico	Rimini	Silver	
Modena	Modena	Modena	Gold	
Montesanto	Montesanto	Ferrara	Bronze	
Monticelli d'Ongina	Monticelli d'Ongina	Piacenza	Bronze	
Monzuno-Vado	Monzuno	Bologna	Silver	
Noceto	Noceto	Parma	Bronze	
Osteria Nuova	Sala Bolognese	Bologna	Bronze	
Ostia Parmense	Borgo Val di Taro	Parma	Bronze	
Ozzano dell'Emilia	Ozzano dell'Emilia	Bologna	Silver	
Ozzano Taro	Ozzano Taro	Parma	Bronze	
Parma	Parma	Parma	Gold	
Piacenza	Piacenza	Piacenza	Gold	
Pian di Venola	Pian di Venola	Bologna	Bronze	
Pianoro	Pianoro	Bologna	Silver	
Pioppe di Salvaro	Pioppe di Salvaro	Bologna	Silver	
Poggio Renatico	Poggio Renatico	Ferrara	Silver	
Pontecchio Marconi	Pontecchio Marconi	Bologna	Bronze	
Pontelagoscuro	Pontelagoscuro	Ferrara	Bronze	
Pontenure	Pontenure	Piacenza	Bronze	
Porretta Terme	Porretta Terme	Bologna	Silver	
Portomaggiore	Portomaggiore	Ferrara	Silver	
Rastignano	Rastignano	Bologna	Bronze	Bologna urban area
Ravenna	Ravenna	Ravenna	Gold	
Reggio Emilia	Reggio Emilia	Reggio Emilia	Gold	
Reggio Emilia AV Mediopadana	Reggio Emilia	Reggio Emilia	Gold	
Riccione	Riccione	Rimini	Silver	
Rimini	Rimini	Rimini	Gold	
Rimini Miramare	Rimini	Rimini	Silver	
Rimini Torre Pedrera	Rimini	Rimini	Bronze	
Rimini Viserba	Rimini	Rimini	Bronze	
Rimini Fiera	Rimini	Rimini	Silver	
Riola	Riola	Bologna	Silver	
Rolo-Novi-Fabbrico	Rolo	Reggio Emilia	Silver	
Rottofreno	Rottofreno	Piacenza	Bronze	
Rubiera	Rubiera	Reggio Emilia	Bronze	
Russi	Russi	Ravenna	Silver	
Sant'Agata sul Santerno	Sant'Agata sul Santerno	Ravenna	Bronze	
Sant'Arcangelo di Romagna	Santarcangelo di Romagna	Rimini	Silver	
San Benedetto Sambro-Castiglione Pepoli	San Benedetto Val di Sambro	Bologna	Silver	
San Biagio	San Biagio di Argenta	Ferrara	Bronze	
San Cassiano	Brisighella	Ravenna	Bronze	
San Felice sul Panaro	San Felice sul Panaro	Modena	Silver	
San Giorgio di Piano	San Giorgio di Piano	Bologna	Silver	
San Giovanni in Persiceto	San Giovanni in Persiceto	Bologna	Silver	
San Giuliano Piacentino	San Giuliano Piacentino	Piacenza	Bronze	
Sant'Ilario d'Enza	Sant'Ilario d'Enza	Reggio Emilia	Bronze	
San Lazzaro di Savena	San Lazzaro di Savena	Bologna	Bronze	Bologna urban area
San Martino in Gattara	San Martino in Gattara	Ravenna	Bronze	
San Nicolò	San Nicolò a Trebbia	Piacenza	Bronze	
San Patrizio	San Patrizio di Conselice	Ravenna	Bronze	
San Pietro in Casale	San Pietro in Casale	Bologna	Silver	
Salsomaggiore Terme	Salsomaggiore Terme	Parma	Silver	
Samoggia	Samoggia	Bologna	Bronze	
Sarmato	Sarmato	Piacenza	Bronze	
Sasso Marconi	Sasso Marconi	Bologna	Silver	
Savignano sul Rubicone	Savignano sul Rubicone	Forlì-Cesena	Silver	
Silla	Silla	Bologna	Silver	
Solarolo	Solarolo	Ravenna	Bronze	
Solignano	Solignano	Parma	Bronze	
Strada Casale	Strada Casale	Ravenna	Bronze	
Torrile-San Polo	Torrile	Parma	Silver	
Vaio Ospedale	Fidenza	Parma	Bronze	
Varignana	Varignana	Bologna	Bronze	
Vergato	Vergato	Bologna	Silver	
Vicofertile	Vicofertile	Parma	Bronze	
Villanova d'Arda	Villanova sull'Arda	Piacenza	Bronze	
Villanova di Reggiolo	Reggiolo	Reggio Emilia	Bronze	
Voltana	Voltana	Ravenna	Bronze	

== FER stations ==
Station	Locality	Province	Notes
Baggiovara			
Baggiovara Ospedale			
Bagnolo in Piano			
Bagnolo Soave			
Barco			
Bazzano	Bazzano		
Bibbiano			
Bibbiano Fossa			
Bibbiano Via Monti			
Bivio Barco			
Bologna Rimesse	Bologna	Bologna	Bologna urban area
Bologna Roveri	Bologna	Bologna	Bologna urban area
Bologna Santa Rita	Bologna	Bologna	Bologna urban area
Bologna Via Larga	Bologna	Bologna	Bologna urban area
Bologna Zanolini	Bologna	Bologna	Bologna urban area
Bondeno	Bondeno	Ferrara	
Boretto			
Bosco			
Brescello			
Budrio	Budrio	Bologna	
Budrio Centro	Budrio	Bologna	
Cà dell'Orbo	Castenaso	Bologna	Bologna urban area
Casalecchio Garibaldi	Casalecchio di Reno	Bologna	Bologna urban area Platforms 1 to 3 are run by RFI, 4 to 5 by FER
Casalecchio Palasport	Casalecchio di Reno	Bologna	Bologna urban area
Casalgrande			
Casinalbo			
Castenaso	Castenaso	Bologna	
Castenaso Stellina	Castenaso	Bologna	
Cavriago	Cavriago	Reggio Emilia	
Cavriago San Nicolò	Cavriago	Reggio Emilia	
Ceretolo	Casalecchio di Reno	Bologna	Bologna urban area
Chiozza			
Chiozzola			
Ciano d'Enza			
Ciano Via Tedaldo da Canossa			
Città del Ragazzo	Ferrara	Ferrara	Ferrara urban area
Consandolo			
Codemondo			
Codigoro	Codigoro	Ferrara	
Codisotto			
Cona	Ferrara	Ferrara	Ferrara urban area
Cona Ospedale	Ferrara	Ferrara	Ferrara urban area
Corniano			
Crespellano			
Dinazzano			
Dogato	Ostellato	Ferrara	
Felonica Po			
Fiorano			
Formigine			
Gualtieri			
Guarda			
Guastalla			
Lentigione			
Luzzara			
Magnacavallo			
Masi Torello			
Massafiscaglia			
Mezzolara			
Migliarino			
Migliaro			
Modena Fornaci	Modena	Modena	
Modena Piazza Manzoni	Modena	Modena	
Modena Piccola	Modena	Modena	
Modena Policlinico	Modena	Modena	
Molinella	Molinella	Bologna	
Muffa			
Novellara			
Ostellato	Ostellato	Ferrara	
Pieve Saliceto			
Pilastrino			
Ponte Ronca			
Portomaggiore Verginese	Portomaggiore	Ferrara	
Reggio all'Angelo	Reggio Emilia	Reggio Emilia	
Reggio Ospizio	Reggio Emilia	Reggio Emilia	
Reggio Santo Stefano	Reggio Emilia	Reggio Emilia	
Reggio Via Fanti	Reggio Emilia	Reggio Emilia	
Pegognaga			
Piazzola			
Pieverossa			
Pratissolo			
Pratofontana			
Quartesana			
Reggio Mediopadana	Reggio Emilia	Reggio Emilia	
Reggio San Lazzaro	Reggio Emilia	Reggio Emilia	
Reggio Santa Croce	Reggio Emilia	Reggio Emilia	
Reggio Stadio	Reggio Emilia	Reggio Emilia	
Riale			
Rovereto-San Vito-Medelana			
San Benedetto Po			
San Bernardino			
San Giacomo			
San Giovanni			
San Polo			
San Rocco Mantovano			
San Tomaso			
Sassuolo Quattroponti	Sassuolo	Modena	
Sassuolo Radici	Sassuolo	Modena	
Sassuolo Terminal	Sassuolo	Modena	
Savignano Comune			
Savignano Mulino			
Scandiano			
Schivenoglia			
Sermide			
Sorbolo			
Stellata Ficarolo			
Tagliata			
Tresigallo-Correggi			
Valcesura			
Vallazza-Carbonara Po			
Veggia			
Vezzola			
Via Boschetto	Ferrara	Ferrara	Ferrara urban area
Via Lunga			
Vigarano Pieve			
Vignola	Vignola	Modena	
Villalunga			
Zerbinate			
Zola Centro	Zola Predosa	Bologna	
Zola Chiesa	Zola Predosa	Bologna	

== See also ==
- Railway stations in Italy
- Ferrovie dello Stato
- Rail transport in Italy
- High-speed rail in Italy
- Transport in Italy
