= Trolleybuses in Bologna =

Transit system in Emilia-Romagna, Italy

Bologna trolleybus system
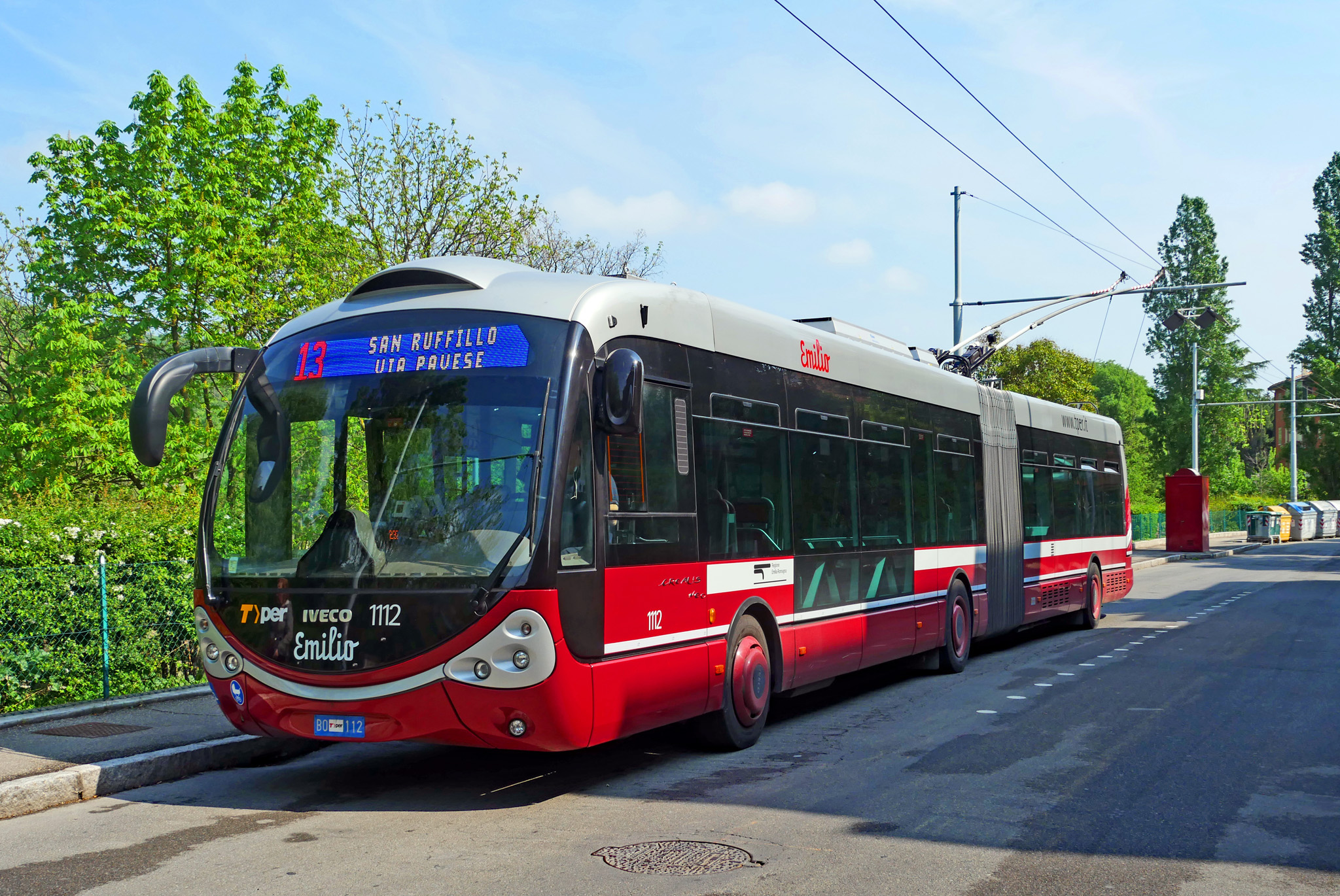
- Iveco Bus Crealis Neo trolleybus 1112 at San Ruffillo/Via Pavese terminus in 2017

Operation
- Locale: Bologna, Emilia-Romagna, Italy

Statistics
First era: 1940–1945
- Status: Closed
Second era: 1955–1982
- Status: Closed
- Routes: 6
- Operators: ATM (to 1975); ATC (from 1975)
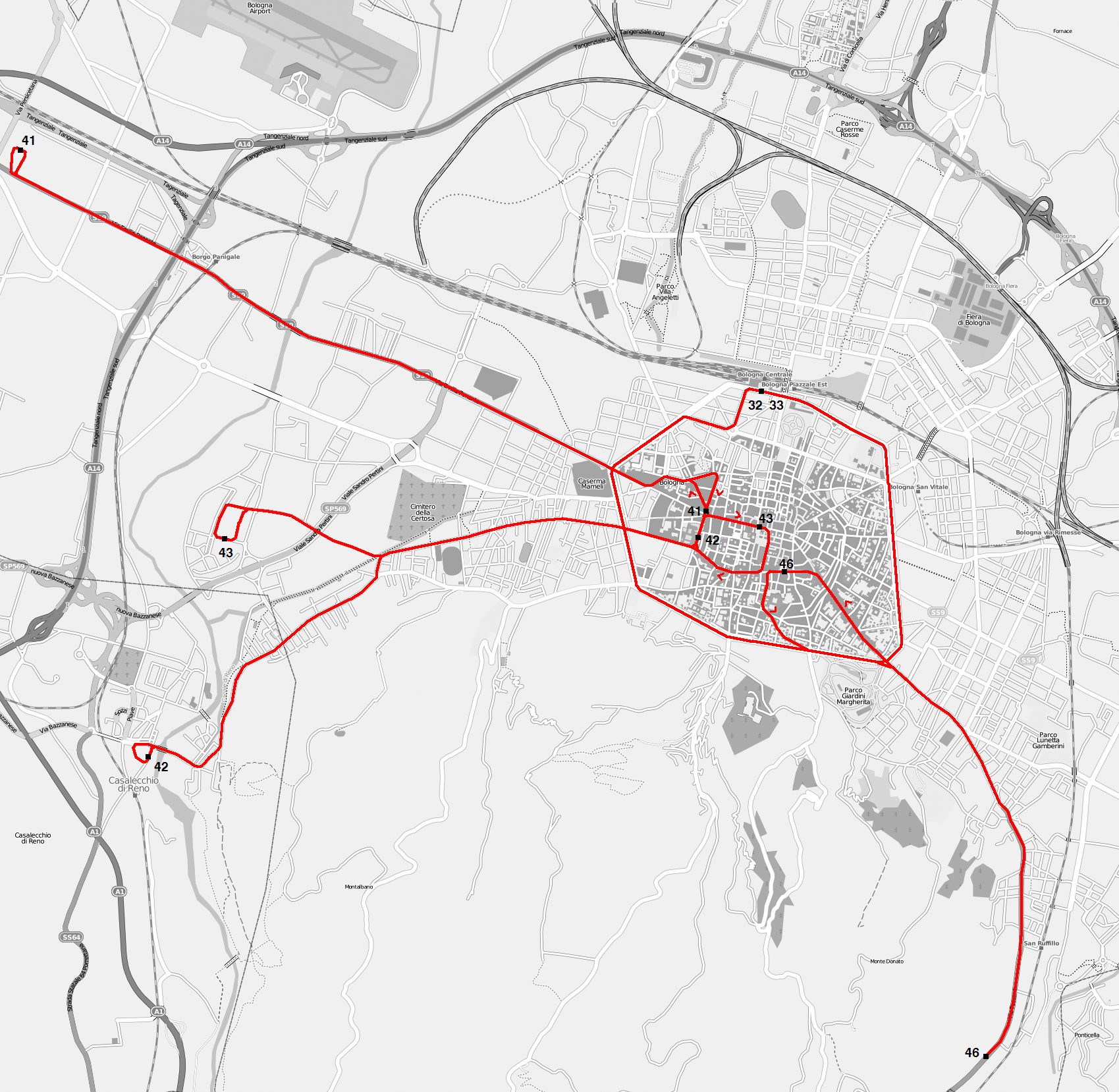
Current era: since 1991
- Status: Open
- Routes: 5
- Operator: TPER (since 2012)
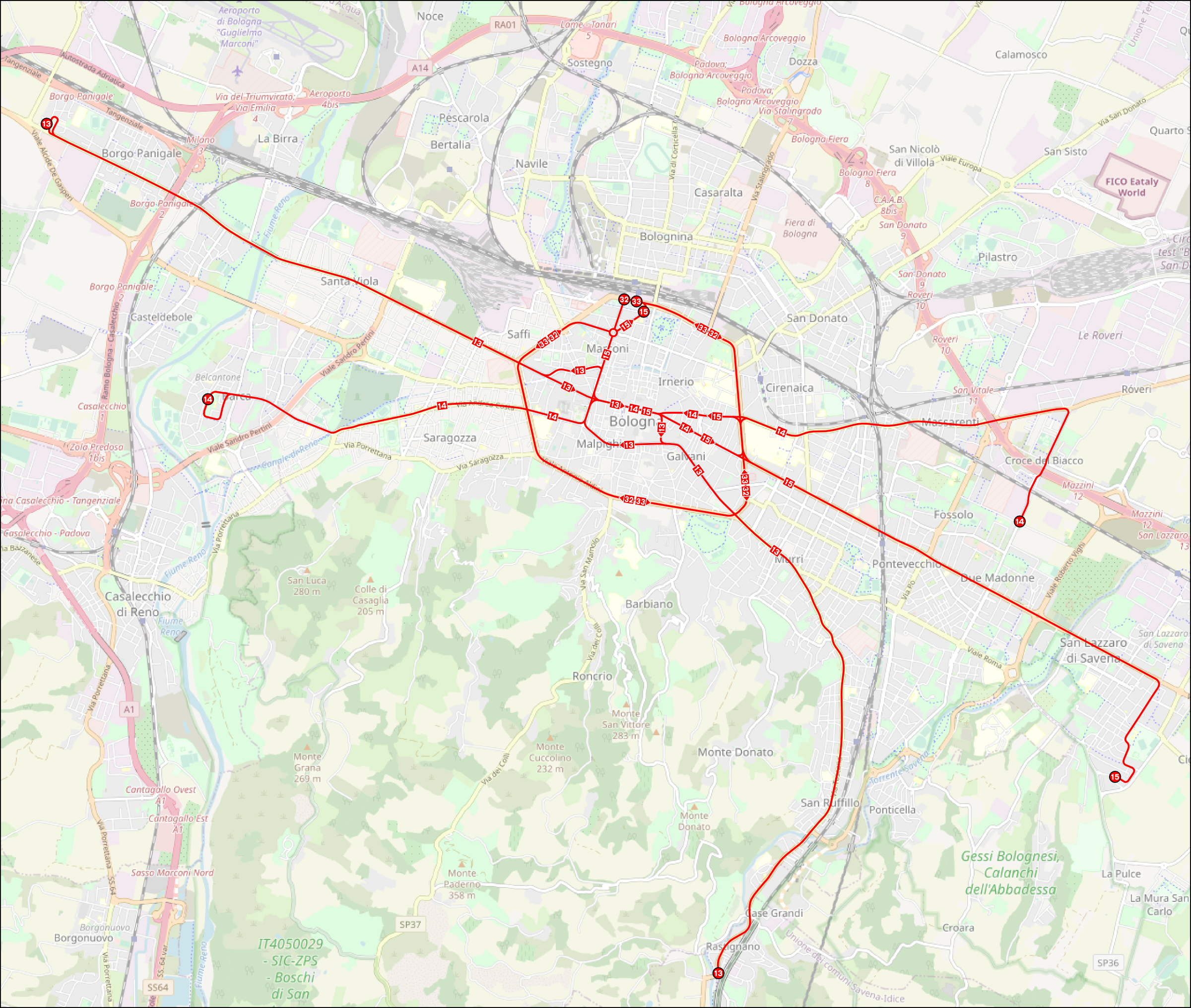
- Website: TPER (in Italian)

The Bologna trolleybus system (Italian: Rete filoviaria di Bologna) is part of the public transport network of the city and comune of Bologna, in the region of Emilia-Romagna, northern Italy. While being in operation since 1991, the current system comprises five urban routes: 13, 14, 15, 32 and 33. Additional routes are presently under construction.

Bologna has had two earlier trolleybus systems. The first one opened in 1940 and lasted only until 1945.

The second earlier system opened in 1955 and was closed in 1982. At the time of its maximum extent in the 1960s and 1970s, it had a total of six routes.

The current trolleybus network reaches beyond Bologna's territory, extending into the neighbouring municipalities of San Lazzaro di Savena (line 15) and Pianoro (line 13). Line 15 opened in 2020 and uses optical guidance as trolleybuses arrive at stops.

== History ==
The first Bologna trolleybus system was opened in October 1940, to integrate with the tramway, as in many other Italian cities. This system, however, lasted only a few years until closed in 1945, as a result of damage sustained to its infrastructure during World War II.

The second trolleybus system was opened in 1955, in anticipation of the total replacement of trams (which were completely eliminated in 1963). However, the second system never reached a large extent, always remaining a minor network compared to the diesel powered bus network.

At the time of its maximum extent (in the 1960s and 1970s), the second system was composed of two circular and four radial lines:

- 32 Circolare esterna destra (right external circular, i.e. clockwise);
- 33 Circolare esterna sinistra (left external circular; i.e. counterclockwise);
- 41 Via Lame – Villaggio INA Casa (Borgo Panigale);
- 42 Piazza Malpighi – Casalecchio;
- 43 Piazza Maggiore – Villaggio CEP (Quartiere Barca);
- 46 Piazza Minghetti – San Ruffillo.

Line 42, with an outer terminus in Casalecchio di Reno, was the only one to exit the municipal area; it provided a service that was integrated with the Casalecchio–Vignola railway, until the latter was later on temporarily closed to passenger traffic and reopened in the early 2000s.

The radial lines had reversing loops at intermediate points on the route:

- on line 41 at Palasport, at Cinta Daziaria and at Borgo Panigale (Via della Salute);
- on line 42 at Croce di Casalecchio;
- on line 43 at Stadio;
- on line 46 at Chiesa Nuova and in Via della Direttissima.

As in other Italian cities, the trolleybus system experienced a decline in the second half of the 1970s, with the phasing out of the lines (converted to bus lines), with line 46 closing (converted to buses) on 1 August 1977; followed by lines 32, 33 and 43 on 30 September 1979; and line 42 on 30 September 1981. The final closure was of line 41 on 1 June 1982 — a "temporary" withdrawal of trolleybuses for the summer which was made permanent on 16 September 1982. Another source gives the last day of service as 14 June 1982. The fleet was eventually disposed of.

=== 1990s revival ===
The overhead wires, however, were left intact, so as to allow for a possible future decision to reopen the system. By 1985, it had been tentatively decided that trolleybus service in Bologna should be revived, with a new fleet of vehicles. In 1988, orders were placed for a fleet of 20 new trolleybuses: 10 from Menarini and 10 from Breda. It was decided that the first line of the reactivated system would be line 13, which was a union of the old lines 41 and 46, with some changes in the city centre portions to connect the two — in particular, new wiring along Via San Felice, Via Rizzoli, Via Santo Stefano and other streets for eastbound trolleybuses. Line 13 would now be a cross-city radial line from Borgo Panigale to San Ruffillo via the city centre. The long-disused overhead wires along former routes 41 and 46 were refurbished in preparation for a planned 1990 reopening. By spring 1990, delivery of both types of new trolleybuses had begun. A ceremonial "inauguration" event took place on 20 April 1990, in connection with a transport conference being held, with one trolleybus of each type running over a short section of the route that was temporarily energised for the occasion.

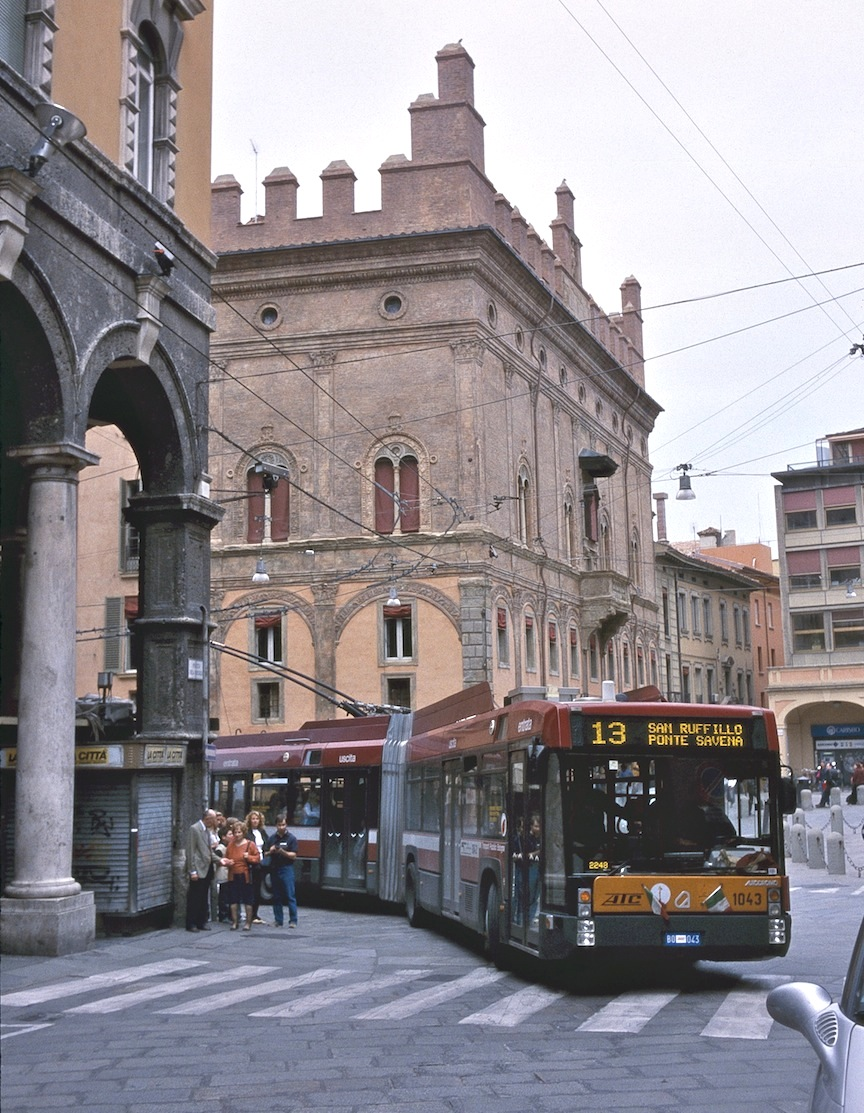
Autodromo trolleybus in the city centre, on line 13, in 2003

The first passenger service on the reopened trolleybus system, on new line 13, began on 4 January 1991 or 2 January. Route 13 remained the only trolleybus line until 2002.

On 14 October 2002, the second stage of expansion was reached, with the reactivation of the circular lines 32 and 33, following the same routings as in the previous trolleybus system, but with refurbished overhead wiring.

Construction of an extension of line 13 within the San Ruffillo district, from Ponte Savena to Via Pavese, began in 2003, and the new section opened for trolleybuses on 13 September 2007. The 1991-reopened loop at Ponte Savena was dismantled.

After the opening of circular line 32/33 in 2002, another 10 years passed before the next trolleybus line was opened. This occurred on 24 September 2012, with the partial conversion to trolleybuses of bus line 14, Piazza Giovanni XXIII – Due Madonne Depot (bus garage) via the city centre. The western half of line 14 had been line 43 of the previous system (the terminus having been called Barca during that period, but following exactly the same routing to Piazza Giovanni XXIII), so this was a reactivation of former line 43, now as part of line 14. The eastern half of line 14 had never previously been a trolleybus line. Initially, service on line 14 remained mostly operated with motorbuses, with trolleybus serving only about one-quarter of its trips, due partly to there being too few trolleybuses available in the fleet and partly to the fact that line 14 has three branches at its eastern end, two of which are not equipped with trolleybus wiring. The trolleybuses in the current fleet have diesel engines enabling them to operate away from the trolley wires, but only to a limited extent. In 2012, only the 11 newest trolleybuses, delivered in 2010 by Solaris Bus & Coach, had sufficiently powerful diesel engines to serve route 14, and diesel buses continued to serve most trips. In December 2017, after all of a batch of 49 new Iveco Crealis trolleybuses had entered service, route 14 finally began using trolleybuses on the majority of its runs.

On 1 February 2012, ATC transferred operation of Bologna's public transport system to TPER (Trasporto Passeggeri Emilia-Romagna), a new entity formed by the merger ATC's operations division with Ferrovie Emilia Romagna (FER).

Construction of a 1.1-km extension of route 13 from San Ruffillo to Rastignano began in 2014. The new section opened for trolleybus service on 15 September 2017 (three months after the service had been extended but temporarily operated solely by motorbuses because the new overhead wiring had not yet received certification for use).

== Services ==
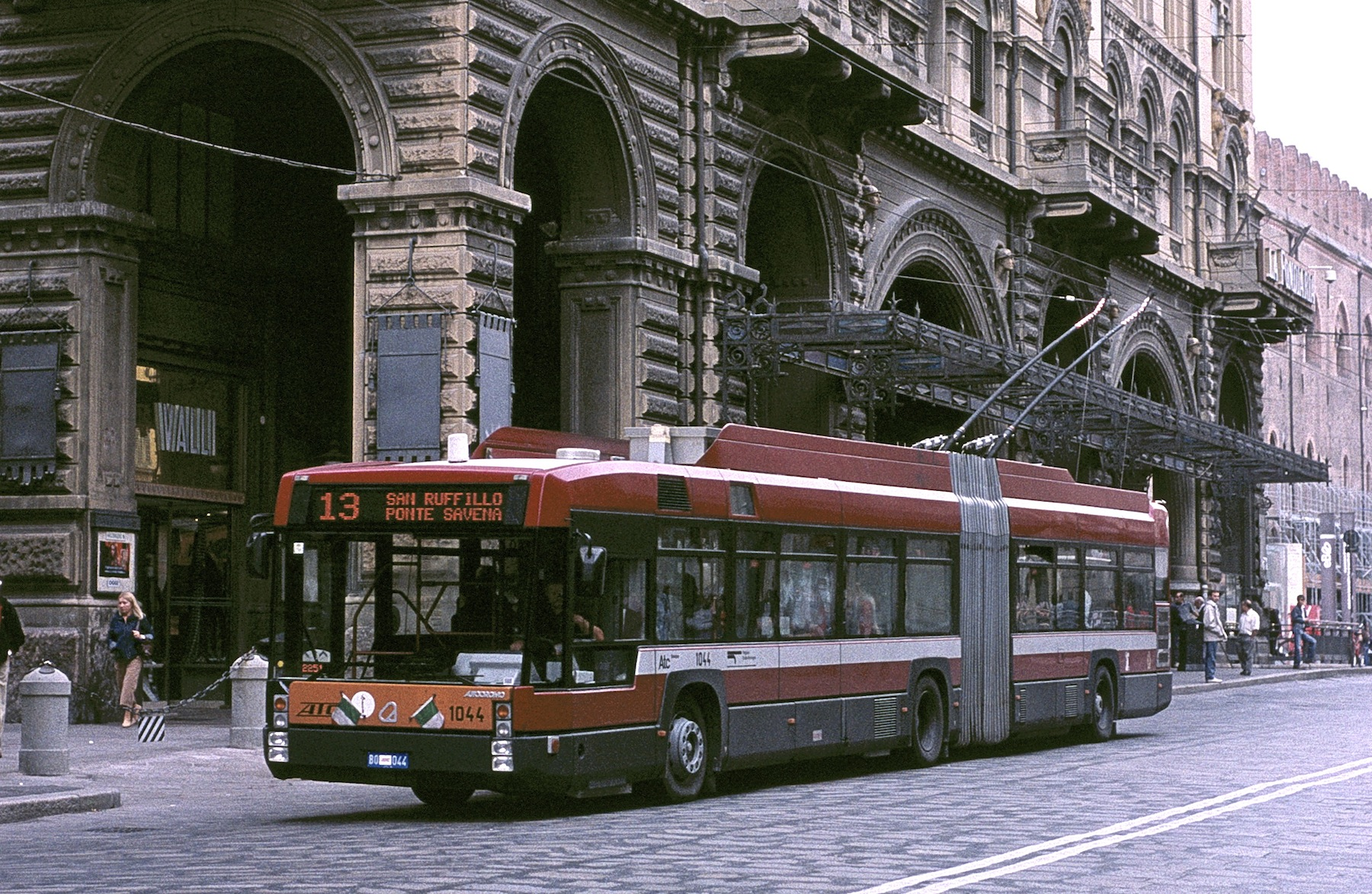
Autodromo/MAN articulated trolleybus no. 1044 on Via Rizzoli

=== Overview ===
The six routes comprising the present Bologna trolleybus system are:

- 13
  - 13 Borgo Panigale – centro (city centre) – San Ruffillo (Via Pavese)
  - 13A Borgo Panigale - San Ruffillo – Rastignano di Pianoro (13A)
- 14
  - 14A Piazza Giovanni XXIII – Due Madonne (partially trolleybus-operated; mostly motorbus-operated currently)
  - 14B Piazza Giovanni XXIII - Z. I. Roveri (partially trolleybus-operated; mostly motorbus-operated currently)
  - 14C Piazza Giovanni XXIII - Pilastro (partially trolleybus-operated; mostly motorbus-operated currently)
- 15 Piazza XX Settembre-Via Rizzoli-Via Mazzini-San Lazzaro di Savena
- 32 Circolare destra (clockwise circular)
- 33 Circolare sinistra (counterclockwise circular)

Currently, all lines in service are equipped with special devices located on the same remote to transmit a "wire fall or break alarm" resulting in a precautionary tripping of power switches. It is also planned to raise the line voltage from 650 to 750 V.

During Saturdays, Sundays and Public Holidays, the City Council of Bologna has implemented a policy closing Via Ugo Bassi, Via Rizzoli, part of Strada Maggiore and half of Via Indipendenza to regular traffic, with routes 13 and 14 travelling through Via Ugo Bassi (13, 14), Via Rizzoli (13, 14) and Strada Maggiore (14). As a result, route 13 is divided into two branches, one starting in Via Lame to Borgo Panigale and the other one starting from Piazza Cavour to San Ruffillo (Via Pavese) and Rastignano. Trolleybuses are used only on the branch between Via Lame and Borgo Panigale, with the trolleybus poles being lowered for the short distance between Via San Felice and Via Lame. Route 14 is diverted on its eastbound routes through Via Marconi, Via dei Mille and Via Irnerio, and therefore cannot use trolleybuses due to the potential damages these vehicles can face when running on their own engines for long distances.

=== Line 13 ===
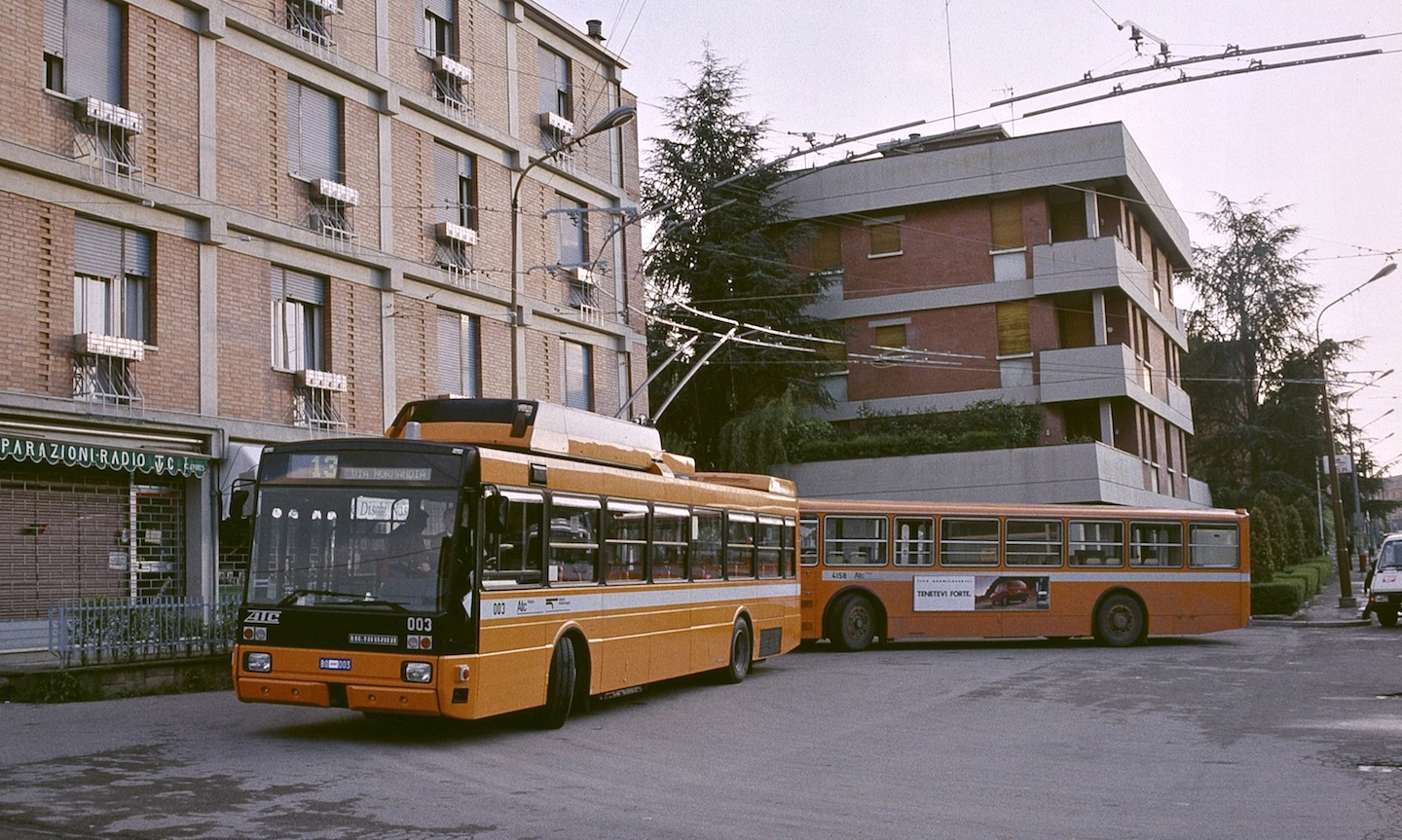
Menarini trolleybus at the San Ruffillo (Ponte Savena) terminus, 1991

This line was born from the union of the previous lines 41 and 46 and was activated for testing in 1990 on the route San Ruffillo (Ponte Savena) – Borgo Panigale (INA Normandia), with regular public service being introduced on 4 January 1991.

The line was initially powered by five electrical substations (Borgo Panigale, Tofane, Avesella, Carducci, Murri). In 2005, the Avesella substation was dismantled (due to its incompatibility with the urban electrical network), and the electrical sections Timavo–Centro and Centro–Porta Santo Stefano were combined into a single Timavo–Porta Santo Stefano section.

In 2003, work began on the extension of the line by about 900 m (3,000 ft) to Via Pavese, with the consequent shifting of line 13's San Ruffillo terminus from Ponte Savena to Via Pavese, and the construction of a new electrical substation at Via Pavese to provide power for the extension. The work was completed during the first half of 2007, and the extension was opened for service on 13 September 2007, to coincide with the introduction of the new winter schedule.

Since 2017, line 13's southern terminus has been Rastignano, after the construction of a new section of overhead wiring beyond San Ruffillo. The route's service was extended to Rastigano on 8 June 2017 (using motorbuses), but trolleybus service was not introduced until 15 September. Alternate journeys continue to terminate on Via Pavese in San Ruffillo.

The evenings extensions to Carteria di Sesto (13A) and Lavino di Mezzo, which operate in both directions during weekdays and to Via Lame or Piazza Cavour on weekends, are operated by motor buses. Route 13A's last departure at 1.30 am from Piazza Cavour on weekends is extended to Pianoro Vecchio to serve the latter when route 96 finishes to operate.

On weekends, since 2013, route 13 is divided into two routes, both designated "13/" (13-barrata), because of pedestrianisation in the city centre. Trolleybuses on route 13 are operated only on its western branch (Via Lame-Borgo Panigale), where they have to run on diesel power for a short distance between Porta San Felice and Via Lame, as the wires continue straight to Via Ugo Bassi and TPER decided against reconnecting and reactivating long-disused wires of former routes 41/46 that cover the shorter routing to/from Via Lame. It is not possible to use trolleybuses on route 13's eastern branch (Piazza Cavour-San Ruffillo/Rastignano di Pianoro) on weekends, due to space concerns, as articulated trolleybuses are too wide to manoeuvre in Piazza Cavour. At the same time, the wires of the old trolleybus route 46, withdrawn in 1981, have been inactive since then. Via Irnerio is equipped with trolleybus wires, which are however reserved for route 15 in its planned T-Days diversion, which is yet to be activated.

=== Line 14 ===
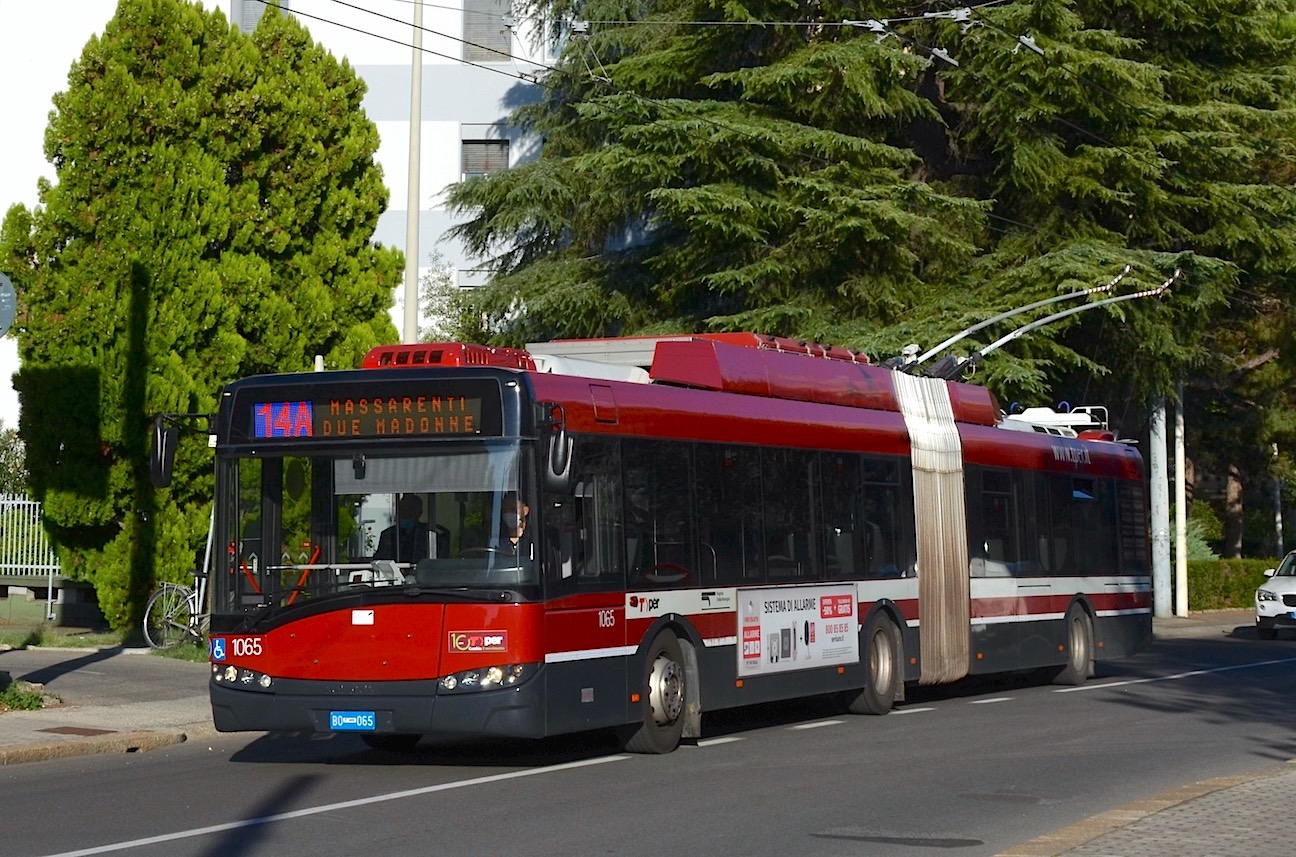
A Solaris Trollino on route 14, which opened to trolleybuses in 2012 but did not become mostly trolleybus-operated until 2017

This line is a union of pre-1982 trolleybus line 43 (Barca), west of the city centre, with a new route east of the city centre to form a double-ended radial route (or cross-city route), between the Barca district and the San Vitale district. It existed in this form as a bus route for many years before the start of its phased conversion to trolleybuses in 2012. The eastern half was built from scratch, having never previously been a trolleybus route. Along the western half, to Piazza Giovanni XXIII in the Barca district, the old trolleybus wiring was completely renewed, but the support poles were re-used. Most works were completed in 2006, but the line's opening was delayed. In the meantime, the planned line 14 had been extended, by the addition of two branches on the eastern section: 14A (the main line) to the end of Via Due Madonne (depot) and 14C to the end of al Pilastro (as well as a third branch, 14B, for the Roveri industrial area, to operate only in the morning rush hour).

After a delay of several years, caused in part by a shortage of trolleybuses, a limited use of trolleybuses in service on line 14 finally began on 24 September 2012, but the route did not become mostly trolleybus-operated until five years later, in December 2017, after a batch of 49 new Iveco trolleybuses entered service. The B and C branches are not equipped with wiring, and are not planned to be, as they have much less service than the route's A branch. At the time of opening for trolleybuses in 2012, the A branch was also not yet equipped with wiring along its outermost section (of 2.7 km), from Rotonda Paradisi to the terminus, Due Madonne depot, but construction work was under way. The wiring to Due Madonne terminus was completed, but the need for an additional substation caused more delays. Around 2020, trolleybuses on line 14A finally began using the overhead wiring to and from Due Madonne terminus.

Line 14 is fed by six substations (Barca, Tofane, San Isaia, Carducci, Massarenti, Due Madonne).

While only the branch 14A, of the route's three eastern branches, is completely equipped with trolleybus infrastructure, trolleybuses are also used on runs that include trips on unwired branches 14B and 14C, where they run in diesel mode between Rotonda Paradisi, Zona Roveri and Pilastro.

=== Line 15 ===
Line 15 was launched on July 1, 2020. Departing from Piazza XX Settembre, near the Bologna bus station and Bologna Centrale railway Station, it terminates in via Pertini in San Lazzaro di Savena; after passing through Via Marconi, Via Ugo Bassi, Via Rizzoli, Strada Maggiore, Via Mazzini, Via Emilia Levante and Via Kennedy (San Lazzaro). It presently has one departure every 20 minutes and operates from Monday to Friday only.

=== Lines 32 and 33 ===
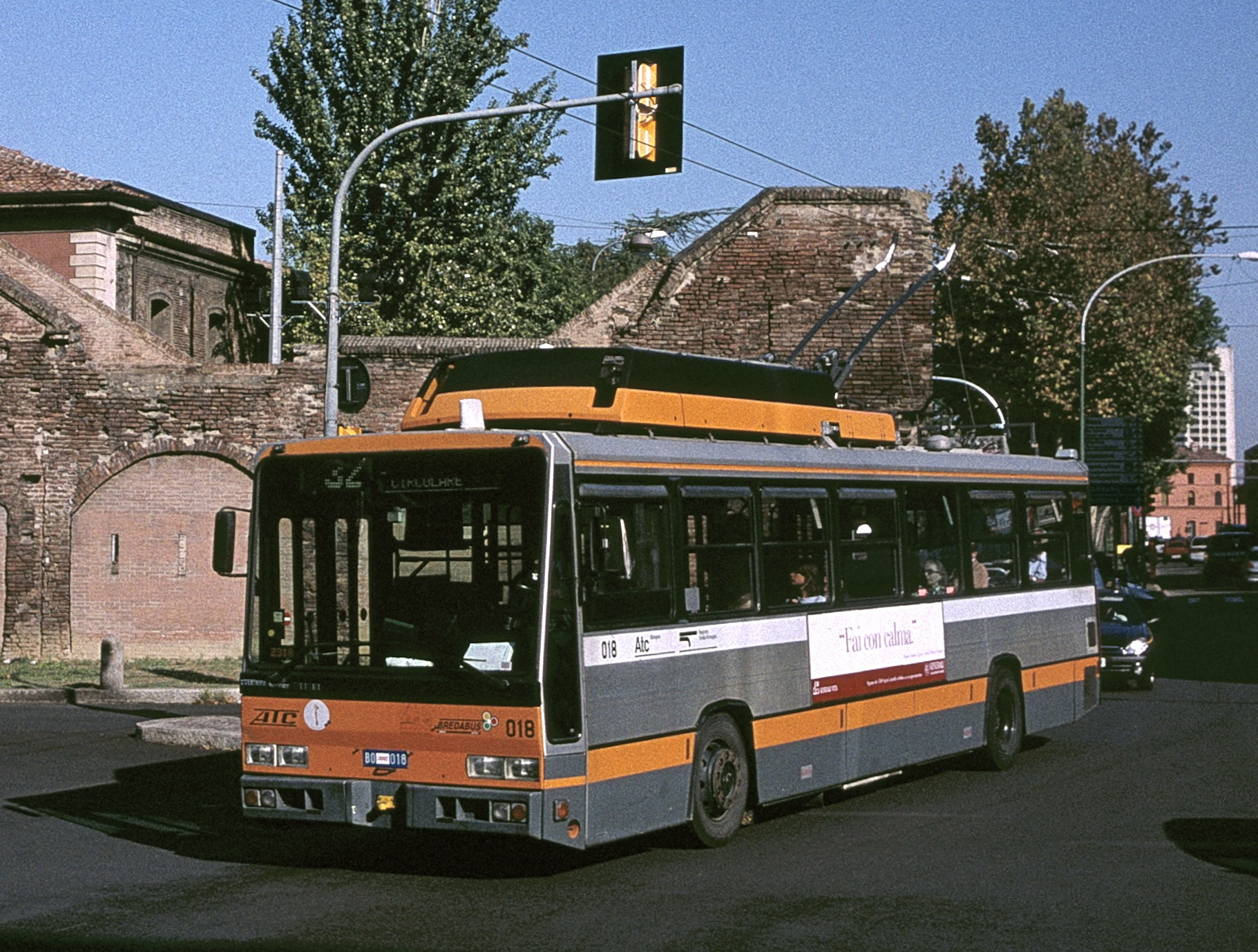
Breda trolleybus on line 32 in 2003

These two lines run along the ring boulevards, and represent the ATC's circular external network. They are electrically connected and are powered by two electric substations (San Isaia, Carducci). Route 32 does not operate on public holidays and, in such events, route 33 is operated by motor buses. In the past years, both routes were not operated by trolleybuses due to improvement and re-adaptations to the network for the Crealis NEO and to remove the voltage differences between routes 13-14 and 32-33.

== Fleet ==
=== Past fleet (1991–2015) ===
When the current Bologna system opened, in 1991, it was operated by ATC. The fleet included 20 trolleybuses:

- 10 Menarini M220 LU (nos. 001–010), 12 m (39 ft 4 in), built 1989; 20 seats, 75 standing places
- 10 Breda 4001.12 (nos. 011–020), 12 m, built 1989; 20 seats, 75 standing places

In 1996–1997, ATC added 20 Autodromo/MAN articulated trolleybuses (nos. 1021–1040), and in 1999–2000 a second series of the same type, 15 vehicles numbered 1041–1055.

In 2010, eleven Solaris articulated trolleybuses (nos. 1056–1066) were added to the fleet, and they began to enter service in December of that year. The last Breda trolleybus was retired in 2012, and the last Menarini vehicles – the last two-axle vehicles in the fleet – were retired in March or April 2013. From that point, the fleet comprised only articulated trolleybuses.

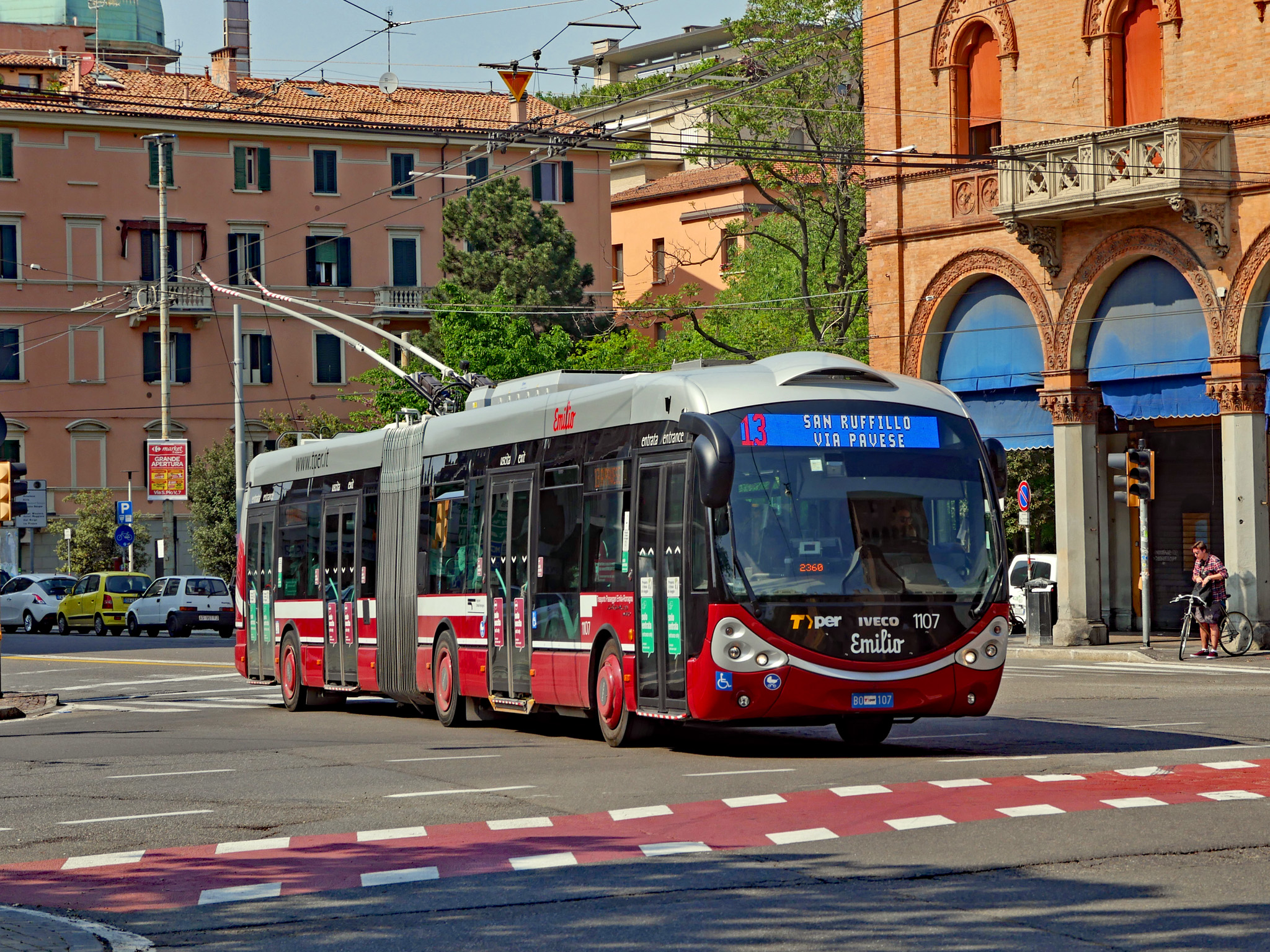
The newest additions to the fleet are 49 Iveco Bus Crealis Neo trolleybuses, which entered service in 2016–2017.

In October 2003, ATC awarded a contract for the construction and equipped for a network of new trolleybus routes that would use optical guidance, and the contract's fleet component was an order for 49 Civis-model articulated trolleybuses (a variant of the Cristalis model), to be built by Irisbus. A prototype was delivered in May 2005, and eventually all 49 vehicles were delivered, but none was ever placed in service. During testing of the first vehicles, ATC identified what it considered to be technical deficiencies with the Civis trolleybuses. It ultimately concluded the vehicles were unsatisfactory. After a period of negotiation, ATC reached an agreement in autumn 2012 with the manufacturer, which by then had been renamed Iveco Bus (following a demerging of Iveco from Fiat in January 2011). Under the agreement, Iveco Bus would replace the entire series of 49 Civis trolleybuses with 55 trolleybuses of a newer model, the Crealis; the quantity was later reduced to 49. The first three were delivered in spring 2015.

=== Present fleet (2016–) ===
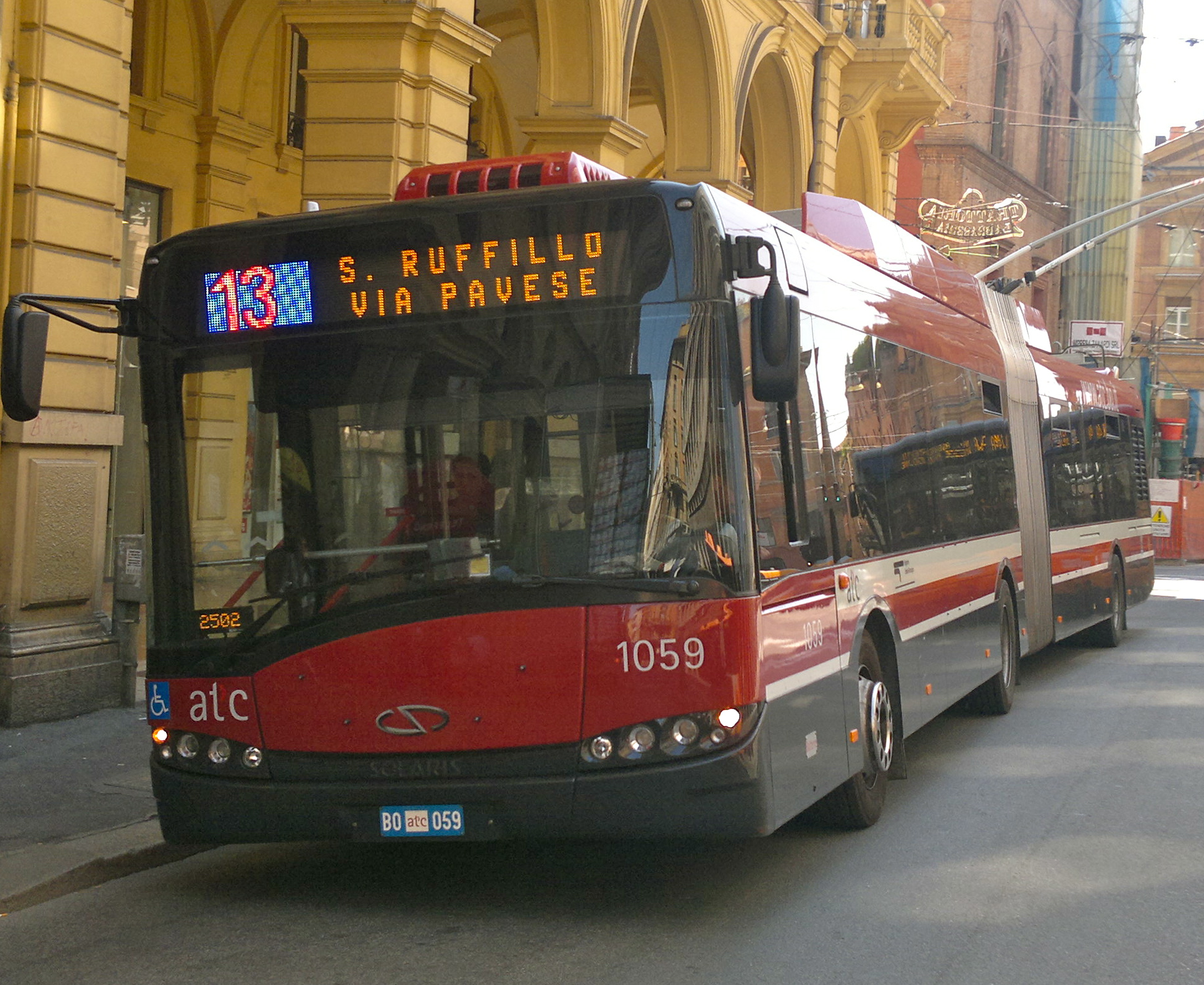
A Solaris Trollino in 2011

Since 2012, the trolleybus system has been operated by TPER. In 2017, the fleet includes 95 trolleybuses:

- 20 Autodromo/MAN articulated trolleybuses, 1st series (nos. 1021–1040), built 1996–97; 36 seats, 108 standing places
- 15 Autodromo/MAN articulated trolleybuses, 2nd series (nos. 1041–1055), built 1999–2000; 37 seats, 102 standing places
- 11 Solaris Trollino articulated trolleybuses (nos. 1056–1066), built 2010
- 49 Iveco Crealis articulated trolleybuses (nos. 1101–1149), built 2015–16; entered service 2016–17.

The order for 49 Crealis Neo trolleybuses, to be built by Iveco Bus, was placed in 2012. The first three were delivered in spring 2015. The first few Crealis trolleybuses entered service in February 2016.

== The Civis controversy ==
On 24 July 2011, the Italian newspaper Il Fatto Quotidiano reported about various accusations against ATC spa, back then the public transport operator of Bologna, of misusing approximately 17.5 million euros. These accusations were made by the Gruppo Tutela della Spesa Pubblica financial watchdog, as they claimed that ATC spent those money from the taxes of local citizens for the Civis project instead of depositing them in the city council's revenue department.

This started in 2004, when then Bologna mayor Giorgio Guazzaloca signed an agreement with Irisbus to purchase the Irisbus Civis for its use in the Bologna trolleybus system.

The Irisbus Civis is a guided bus which is currently in service as trolleybus in France, and Castellón, in Spain, and had previously been in service as a bus in Las Vegas. In Bologna, it was described improperly as "tram on tyres", while in reality it was an optically-guided trolleybus. The Irisbus Civis vehicles for Bologna were 18.430 m long, 2.550 m wide and could accommodate a total of 145 passengers.

The project was to create a better transportation service between Bologna and San Lazzaro di Savena, with some interchanges in the Servizio Ferroviario Metropolitano, back then in its planning stages. It was carried out by ATC Bologna, the Italian Ministry of Infrastructure and Transport, and various local entities. It involved the repavement of several roads in Bologna and San Lazzaro and the improvement of various bus stops to make them accessible to disabled people. Other stops were also built in San Lazzaro, many of which are still inactive.

The works for the Civis started in 2007 and the first tests of the vehicles were carried out between 2010 and 2011. However, it soon became clear that the Civis was unsafe to drive, causing opposition and outright refusal by local drivers to operate it.

In fact, various ATC bus drivers declared that it was too large to pass through certain streets in the city centre (namely Strada Maggiore and Via San Vitale, which are now served by trolleybus routes 14 and 15), and that the driver's seat situated in the centre of the bus did not allow for a lateral view of the roads. This caused the intervention of a ministerial enquiry by the Ufficio Speciale dei Trasporti a Impianti Fissi (USTIF); which officially declared the Civis unsafe to drive and caused the project to be shelved in 2011. A director for the construction of the related infrastructures claimed that ATC and Irisbus insisted to carry out the project despite it being already initially rejected in 2005 due to various technical inconsistencies.

The failure of Civis started several investigations against ATC, Irisbus and the former mayor Guazzaloca, with the latter being acquitted in 2014.

== The Crealis project ==
In 2012, as a make-it-right gesture, Irisbus agreed to replace the 49 Civis with 49 Irisbus Crealis Neo at no additional cost, in an agreement between Bologna mayor Virginio Merola and TPER. (The following year, Irisbus, which had been owned by Iveco since 2003, was rebranded as Iveco Bus.)

The new project included further roads improvements in Bologna and San Lazzaro di Savena, in a process of working called Cantieri BOBO ("BOBO workshop"). The first stage of the works was carried out between June 2014 and December 2014 in Strada Maggiore and Via Mazzini, causing the diversion of bus routes T1, 14, 19, 25, 27, 101, 106, 916 and 918.

This was followed by a second stage between February 2015 and the 30 November 2015, where a repavement of the entire Via Ugo Bassi, Via Rizzoli, Piazza Maggiore and part of Via Indipendenza, causing the diversion and adoption of the weekend diversions of routes A, C, 11, 13, 14, 18, 19, 20, 25, 27 29B, and 30; while route T1, normally in service during the weekends, became a daily route for such period. At the same time, further BOBO works were carried out in San Lazzaro di Savena in 2015. The second phase of the works was criticised and slowed down due to various protests, since the first excavations brought to light an old medieval square and various other archaeological remains.

Following the last works, the first Iveco Crealis Neo trolleybus was presented to the citizens of Bologna on 2 February 2016, with an inaugural trip departing from Piazza Minghetti along the routing of line 13. Soon after, they were put into public service on route 13 and, later, on route 14. The buses were named "Emilio" following a naming competition among various primary schools in Bologna.

The last stage of works began in June 2016, and lasted for four months, with the repaving of an area of Piazza XX Settembre where a new bus terminus for the Crealis would be built for future route 15.

After various tests and the delay caused by the COVID-19 pandemic in Italy, route 15 was inaugurated on 1 July 2020.

== Depots ==
The system has three depots. Due Madonne Depot, in the east; Battindarno Depot, in the west; and Ferrarese Depot, in the north. Only the Due Madonne depot is connected to the trolleybus route network with overhead wires; for other depots, trolleybuses use their diesel-powered generators to run to and from the depots. Ferrarese Depot is relatively new, having opened in 2013 (initially only for motorbuses; for trolleybuses in 2016). Deposito Battindarno kept its trolleybus connection, but its wires have been inactive since 1981.

== See also ==
- List of trolleybus systems in Italy
- Trams in Bologna (1880-1963)
- Bologna tramway
