= Bologna tramway =

Tramway system serving Bologna

Trams in Bologna

Overview
- Owner: TPER
- Locale: Bologna, Italy
- Transit type: Tram
- Number of lines: 2 under construction (as of 2024), out of 4 foreseen
- Number of stations: 50 (lines 1+2)
- Website: www.trambologna.it

Operation
- Operation will start: 2027

Technical
- System length: 22.4 km (lines 1+2)
- Track gauge: 1435 mm
- Electrification: 700 V DC

The Bologna tramway network (Italian: Rete tranviaria di Bologna) is a tramway network under construction in Bologna, Italy.

== History ==
The reintroduction of a tram network in Bologna was foreseen by the local Piano Urbano della Mobilità Sostenibile (PUMS, Italian for Urban Sustainable Mobility Plan), adopted on 27 November 2018. Bologna's PUMS suggested the gradual replacement of the main urban bus and trolleybus lines by 4 tram lines:

- Red line: from Borgo Panigale to Centro Agro-Alimentare di Bologna, via Bologna Centrale railway station
- Green line: from Bologna Corticella railway station to Due Madonne/via Larga, via Bologna Centrale railway station
- Yellow line: from Casteldebole railway station to Rastignano railway station
- Blue line: from Casalecchio Garibaldi railway station to San Lazzaro di Savena railway station

On 7 March 2019, the mayor of Bologna officially announced plans to build a new citywide tramway network.

As of June 2022, the tender for the executive design and construction of tramway line 1 (red line) has been awarded: the whole line was expected to be operational by 2026. Funding for construction of line 2 (green line) was approved by the Italian Ministry of Infrastructure and Transport in November 2021; activation was also expected by 2026. A further segment of line 2 (blue line) was announced on 11 December 2021, with completion to be expected at a later date than the first two lines. Construction of the first line started on 26 April 2023, while construction of the second line started on 8 August 2024.

On 8 September 2026, the first CAF tram arrived in Bologna at the Borgo Panigale depot. Initially, testing of the vehicle would occur within the depot before later in the month doing test runs in the street between the depot and Via Cavalieri Ducati.

As of October 2026, the opening date was expected to be in 2027.

== Network ==
As of August 2024, construction of the following tram lines is underway:

Line		Stations	Length	Opening foreseen
1	Borgo Panigale – Fiera/CAAB	34	16.5 km	2027
2	Via dei Mille – Corticella	19	7.4 km	2027
Network		50*	22.4 km*	
* 4 stops and 1.5 km in common between lines 1 and 2.

Furthermore, the following tram lines (or sections) are in the planning stage:

Line		Stations	Length	Planning stage
2	Corticella – Castel Maggiore			A pre-feasibility study has been completed in January 2021
2	Via dei Mille – Casalecchio Palasport railway station			Announced on 11 December 2021

=== Line 1 (red) ===
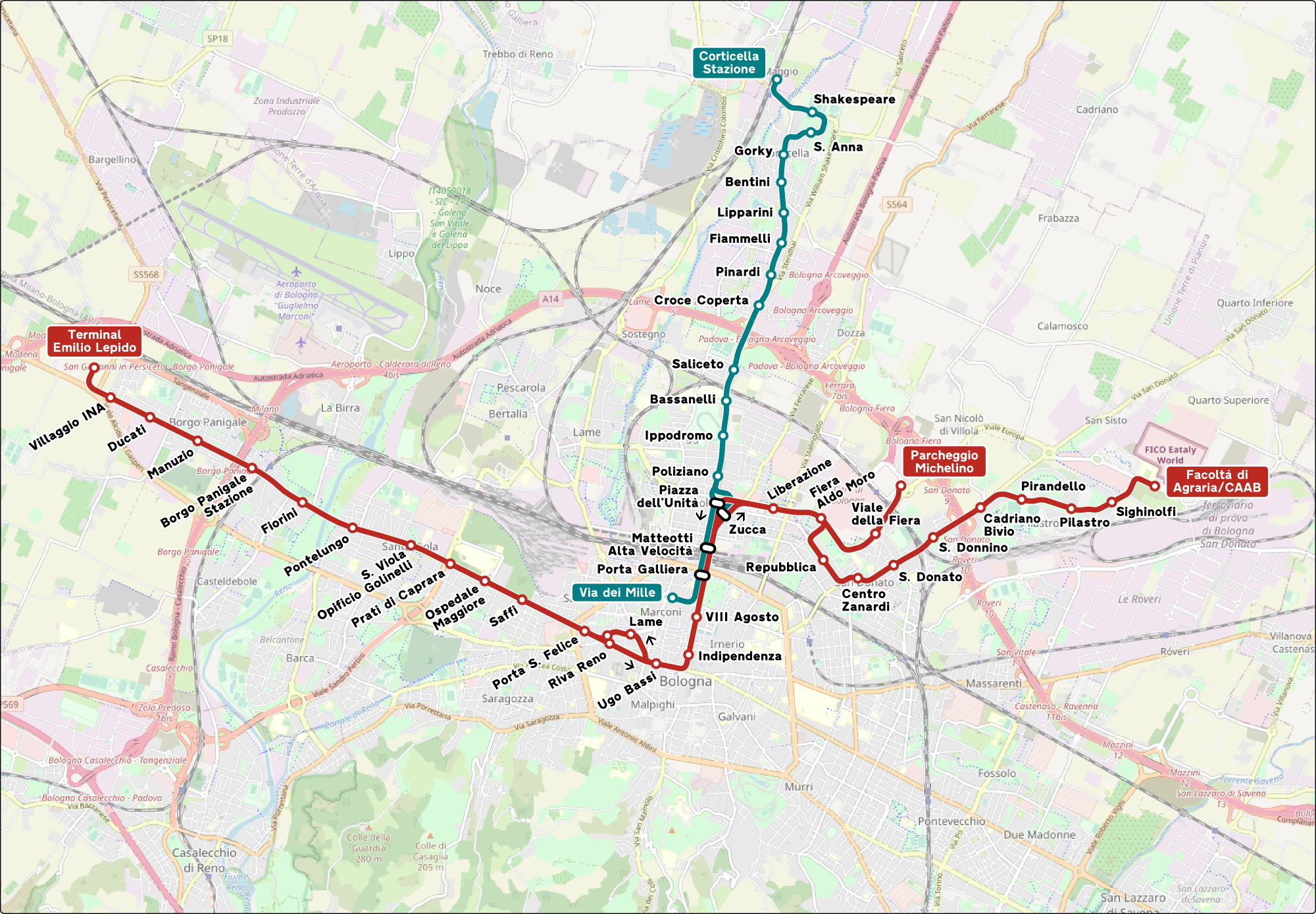
Bologna's tramway network expected to open in 2027. Line 1 (Borgo Panigale–Fiera/CAAB) and Line 2 (Via dei Mille–Corticella) are included.

Line 1 will have its western terminus at Borgo Panigale Terminal, where a 400-car parking lot is planned, joined with an interchange terminal with intercity bus services. In the opposite direction there will be a double terminus, at the CAAB and at the Michelino parking lot. The main attractors served by the line are Bologna Borgo Panigale railway station, the Maggiore Hospital, the city center, Bologna Centrale railway station, Bologna's Fiera District, the Pilastro district, the Faculty of Agriculture and the CAAB.

Line 1 will feature 34 stops, for a total length of 16.5 km, of which 14.5 km with an overhead contact line; the 2-km tracks in the city center, from Porta San Felice to via Matteotti, won't feature any suspended power line, as the tram will be powered by batteries.

The technical and economic feasibility study for the first line has been carried out by a temporary association of companies formed by Systra, Sotecni, Architecna, Studio Mattioli, Aegis and Cooperativa Archeologia.

The definitive project was published on 25 November 2020. The tender for the executive design and construction was launched on 6 August 2021 and closed on 1 December, receiving four bids.

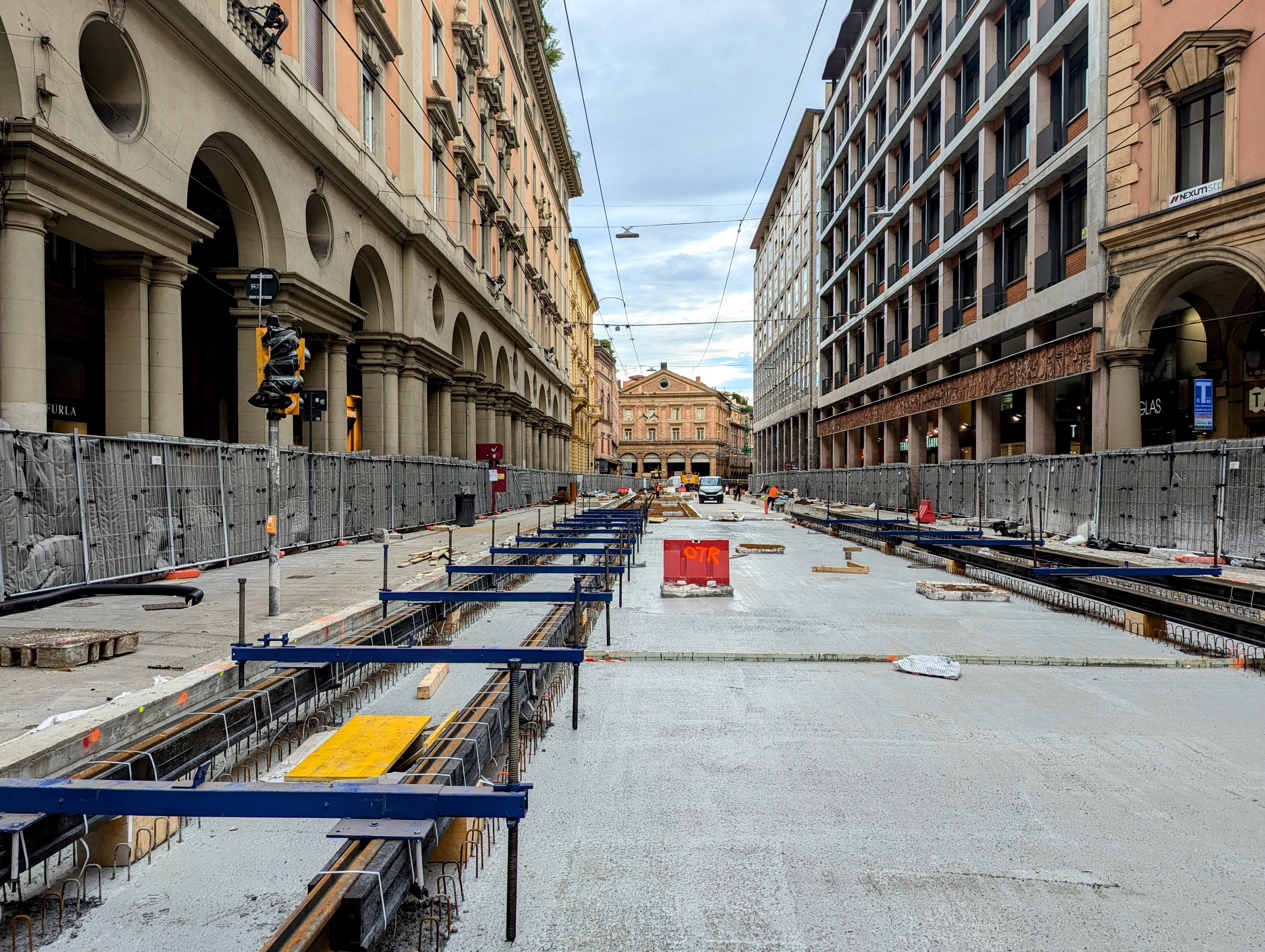
Tramway construction works in via Ugo Bassi, Bologna, September 2024

As of December 2021, the expected timetable is as follows:

- Spring 2022: awarding of the executive project and works
- Autumn 2022: approval of the executive project
- End of 2022: start of the works
- 2026: the new tramway line was expected to be fully operational. (revised to 2027)

In May 2022, the tender for the executive design and construction of Line 1 was awarded to a temporary association of companies led by CMB - Cooperativa Muratori e Braccianti di Carpi and including Alstom Ferroviaria, Pavimental and Alstom Transport, for an amount of €320,517,902.

Construction works started on 26 April 2023.

=== Line 2 (green) ===
Line 2 will have its southern terminus at Via dei Mille, in the city centre. In the opposite direction, the northern terminus will be at Via di Vittorio, in the municipality of Castel Maggiore, where a new parking lot and an interchange terminal for intercity bus services has been envisaged. The main attractors served by the line are Bologna Centrale railway station, the Bolognina district, the Corticella district and Bologna Corticella railway station.

Line 2 will feature 19 stops, for a total length of 7.4 km, of which 4 stops and 1.5 km will be shared with Line 1.

On 30 December 2020, the technical and economic feasibility study for the construction of the second tram line, the green line, was publicly presented to the Navile district mobility committee, with regard to the tram line stretch between the northern terminus (Corticella) and via dei Mille. On 7 January 2021, the municipality of Castel Maggiore mandated the municipality of Bologna to submit a pre-feasibility study to the Italian Ministry of Transport for a further extension of the green line to the center of Castel Maggiore. The joint request for funding, amounting to 222,142,224.26 euros, was sent to the Ministry of Infrastructure and Transport on 14 January 2021.

On 3 November, the Ministry approved the full financing of the new line by Next Generation EU funds, which binds its construction by 2026.

Construction works started on 8 August 2024.

== Vehicles ==
In October 2024, the Spanish firm Construcciones y Auxiliar de Ferrocarriles (CAF) was awarded the tender to supply up to 60 trams to Bologna over six years. An initial order for 35 trams is already financed for a value of over €130 million. The deal includes maintenance for four years and the supply of spare parts and specialized tools.

The bidirectional trams, based on the CAF Urbos model, will have five sections and be 34.7 metres long, 2.4 metres wide and 3.56 metres tall. Each tram will have a capacity of 300 passengers (232 standing and 68 seated) and two positions for passengers with disabilities. Trams will have batteries to pass over sections of the line without overhead wire such as through the city's historic centre. The trams will have four bogies. To reduce the risk wheel squealing on tight curves, the bogie at each end of the tram will be able to rotate. Security features will include electrodynamic braking system for emergencies, anti-collision devices, and interior video surveillance.

The tram depot will be at Borgo Panigale.

== See also ==
- List of town tramway systems in Italy
- Rail transport in Italy
- List of tram and light rail transit systems
- Trolleybuses in Bologna
