= Casalecchio Palasport railway station =

Railway station in Emilia-Romagna, Italy

Casalecchio Palasport

General information
- Location: Casalecchio di Reno, Emilia-Romagna; Italy
- Coordinates: 44.4846°N 11.2485°E
- Operator: Ferrovie Emilia Romagna
- Line: Casalecchio-Vignola
- Tracks: 1
- Train operators: Trenitalia Tper
- Connections: Bologna buses

History
- Opened: 1994
Location
- Location within Emilia-Romagna Location within Northern Italy Location within Italy

Casalecchio Palasport (Italian: Stazione di Casalecchio Palasport) is a railway station serving Casalecchio di Reno, in the region of Emilia-Romagna, northern Italy. The station is located on the Casalecchio-Vignola railway. The train services are operated by Trenitalia Tper.

The station is currently managed by Ferrovie Emilia Romagna (FER).

== Location ==
Casalecchio Palasport railway station is situated west of the city centre, next to the Unipol Arena.

== History ==
The station was opened on February 28, 1994.

== Features ==
The station does not feature any building. It consists of a single track.

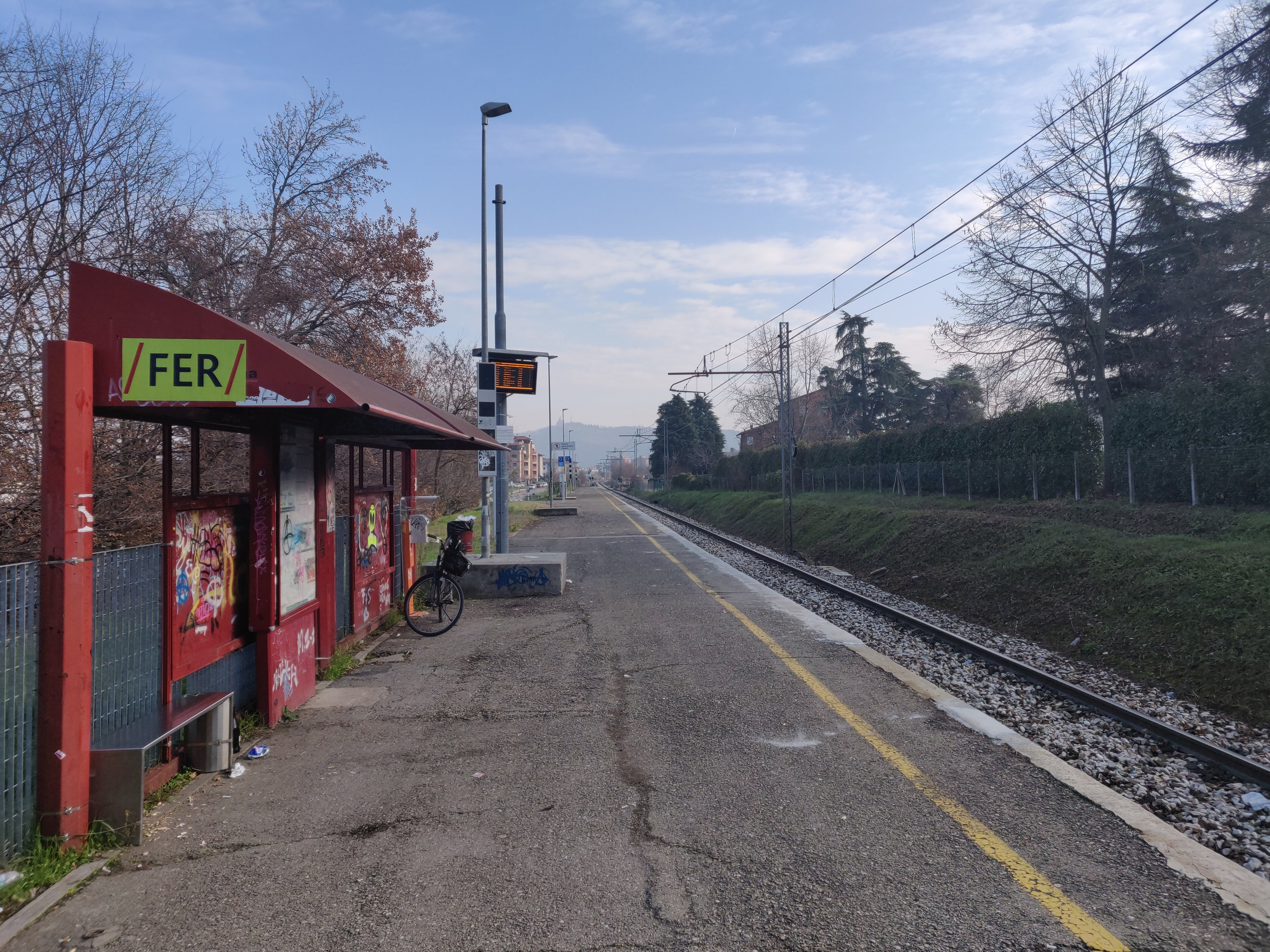
The station does not feature any building.

== Train services ==
The station is served by the following service(s):

- Suburban services (Treno suburbano) on line S2A, Bologna - Vignola

== See also ==
- List of railway stations in Bologna
- List of railway stations in Emilia-Romagna
- Bologna metropolitan railway service
