= San Lazzaro di Savena railway station =

Railway station in Italy

San Lazzaro di Savena

General information
- Location: San Lazzaro di Savena, Emilia-Romagna; Italy
- Coordinates: 44.4789°N 11.4163°E
- Operator: Rete Ferroviaria Italiana
- Line: Bologna-Ancona-Pescara-Bari-Lecce
- Tracks: 2
- Train operators: Trenitalia Tper
- Connections: Bologna buses

Other information
- Classification: Bronze

History
- Opened: 2008
Location
- Location within Emilia-Romagna Location within Northern Italy Location within Italy

San Lazzaro di Savena (Italian: Stazione di San Lazzaro di Savena) is a railway station serving San Lazzaro di Savena, in the region of Emilia-Romagna, northern Italy. The station opened in 2008 and is located on the Adriatic railway. The train services are operated by Trenitalia Tper.

The station is currently managed by Rete Ferroviaria Italiana (RFI), a subsidiary of Ferrovie dello Stato Italiane (FSI), Italy's state-owned rail company.

== Location ==
San Lazzaro di Savena railway station is situated north of the city centre.

== History ==
The station was opened on 30 July 2008.

== Features ==
The station does not feature any building.

It consists of two tracks linked by an underpass.

== Train services ==
The station is served by the following service(s):

- Suburban services (Treno suburbano) on line S4B, Bologna - Imola

== See also ==
- List of railway stations in Bologna
- List of railway stations in Emilia-Romagna
- Bologna metropolitan railway service
