= Portomaggiore railway station =

Railway halt in Italy

Portomaggiore

General information
- Location: Portomaggiore; Italy
- Coordinates: 44.697°N 11.800°E
- Operator: Rete Ferroviaria Italiana
- Lines: Bologna–Portomaggiore railway, Ferrara–Ravenna–Rimini railway
- Tracks: 4
- Train operators: Trenitalia Tper

Other information
- Classification: Bronze
Location
- Location within Emilia-Romagna Location within Northern Italy Location within Italy

Portomaggiore (Italian: Stazione di Portomaggiore) is a railway station in Portomaggiore, in the province of Ferrara, in the region of Emilia-Romagna, northern Italy. The station is on the Ferrara–Ravenna–Rimini railway and is the eastern terminus of the Bologna–Portomaggiore railway. The train services are operated by Trenitalia Tper.

The station is currently managed by Rete Ferroviaria Italiana (RFI), a subsidiary of Ferrovie dello Stato Italiane (FSI), Italy's state-owned rail company.

It is the terminus of Line S2B of Bologna metropolitan railway service.

== Location ==
Portomaggiore railway station is south-west of the city centre.

== History ==
The station was inaugurated in 1887.

== Features ==
The station consists of four tracks linked by an underpass.

== Train services ==
The station is served by the following service(s):

- Suburban services (Treno suburbano) on line S2B, Bologna – Portomaggiore

As of November 2018, the average daily patronage in the station amounted to 1502 passengers per day (675 leaving + 827 arriving).

== See also ==
- List of railway stations in Emilia-Romagna
- Bologna metropolitan railway service
