= Italicus Express bombing =

1974 terror attack in San Benedetto Val di Sambro, Emilia-Romagna, Italy

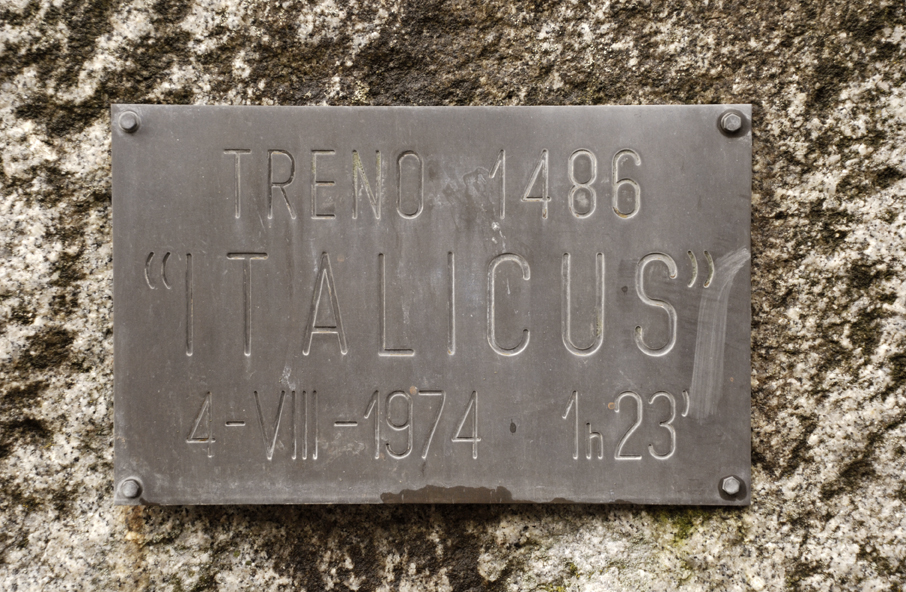
- Memorial plaque
- Location: 44°12′29″N 11°11′23″E; San Benedetto Val di Sambro, Emilia-Romagna, Italy
- Date: 4 August 1974; 01:23 (UTC+1)
- Attack type: Bombing
- Weapon: Improvised explosive device
- Deaths: 12
- Injuries: 48
- Perpetrator: Unknown members of Ordine Nero

The Italicus Express massacre (Italian: Strage del treno Italicus) was a terrorist bombing in Italy on a train of the public rail network. On 4 August 1974, the bomb attack killed 12 people and wounded 48. Responsibility was claimed by the neo-fascist terrorist organization Ordine Nero (Black Order).

== Bombing ==
The Italicus Express was a night train of the Ferrovie dello Stato on which, during the early hours of 4 August 1974, a bomb exploded, killing 12 people and injuring 48. The train was traveling from Rome to Munich; having left Florence about 45 minutes earlier, it was approaching the end of the long San Benedetto Val di Sambro tunnel under the Apennines. The bomb had been placed in the fifth passenger car of the train and exploded at 01:23. Under its own momentum, the train reached the end of the tunnel. The effects of the explosion and subsequent fire would have been even more terrible had the train remained inside the confined space of the tunnel. Former Prime Minister of Italy Aldo Moro had been on the train on 3 August but disembarked before the train left Rome.

=== List of victims ===
- Elena Donatini
- Nicola Buffi
- Herbert Kotriner
- Nunzio Russo
- Maria Santina Carraro
- Marco Russo
- Tsugufumi Fukuda
- Antidio Medaglia
- Elena Celli
- Raffaella Garosi
- Wìlhelmus Jacobus Hanema
- Silver Sirotti

=== Claim of responsibility ===
The following day, the fascist terrorist group Ordine Nero (Black Order) issued this statement:

We took revenge for Giancarlo Esposti. We wanted to show the nation that we can place a bomb anywhere we want, whenever and however we please. Let us see in autumn; we will drown democracy under a mountain of corpses.

According to Novopress, Giancarlo Esposti was killed on 30 May 1974, two days after the Piazza della Loggia bombing.

== Investigation ==
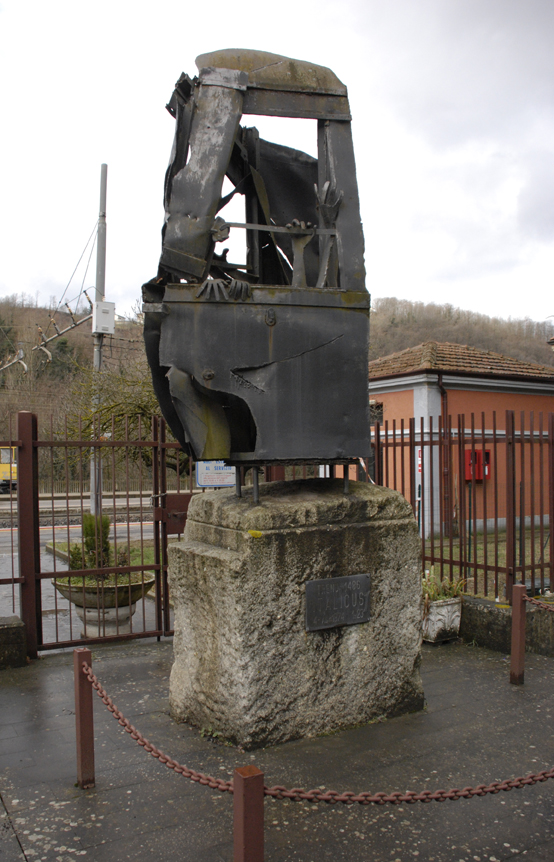
Italicus Express massacre memorial at San Benedetto Val di Sambro-Castiglione dei Pepoli railway station

Aurelio Fianchini, a leftist militant who had just escaped from prison, told the press that the bomb was placed in the Italicus Express by Mario Tuti's subversive commando unit: Piero Malentacchi (who had planted the explosive at the Firenze Santa Maria Novella railway station), Luciano Franci and Margherita Luddi. They received the order from the Italian fascist terrorist organizations Fronte Nazionale Rivoluzionario ("revolutionary national front") and Ordine Nuovo.

At the time, police and intelligence knew that Tuti was a subversive. A few months after the Italicus bombing, a woman declared to judge Mario Marsili—son-in-law of Licio Gelli of the Masonic lodge Propaganda Due—that the author of the massacre was Tuti. Charges were soon filed by the magistrate, but the woman was interned in a mental hospital as a mythomaniac.

== Trials ==
On 24 January 1975 Mario Tuti escaped from arrest by killing police sergeant Leonardo Falco and corporal Giovanni Ceravolo, and seriously injuring corporal Arturo Rocca. He fled to Ajaccio, Corsica and then relocated to the French Riviera. On 16 May 1975, he was convicted and sentenced to life imprisonment in absentia, which was confirmed on 30 November 1976 in the final sentence. On 27 July, Tuti was arrested by French police after a bloody confrontation in Saint-Raphaël, and was extradited to Italy for trial. Tuti was sentenced to a 20-year prison term for two bomb attacks that had occurred on 31 December 1974 and in January 1975, illegal possession of explosives and firearms and for promoting and organizing the reconstruction of the Fascist Party.

Main stages of the Italicus massacre's trial:

- 20 July 1983: Luciano Franci, Piero Malentacchi, Margherita Luddi and Tuti are acquitted for lack of evidence; Francesco Sgrò (janitor at the University of Rome) is convicted of slander.
- 18 December 1986: Franci and Tuti are sentenced to life imprisonment; Malentacchi and Luddi are acquitted for lack of evidence; Sgrò is again convicted of slander.
- 16 December 1987: The Court of Cassation declares the appeal process must be redone.
- 4 April 1991: Franci and Tuti are acquitted for lack of evidence; Malentacchi and Luddi are acquitted at the request of the public prosecutor.
- 24 March 1992: The final judgment of the Court of Cassation confirms the acquittals of Franci and Tuti.

== See also ==
- Anni di piombo ("years of lead")
- Bologna massacre
- Giorgio Bocca, author of "Gli anni del terrorismo"
- La notte della Repubblica (TV programme)
- List of massacres in Italy
- List of terrorist incidents involving railway systems
- List of terrorist incidents, 1974
- Piazza della Loggia bombing
- Terrorism in Italy
- Train 904 bombing
- U.S. Army Field Manual 30-31B
