= San Benedetto Val di Sambro–Castiglione dei Pepoli railway station =

Railway station in Italy

San Benedetto V.S.– Castiglione dei P.
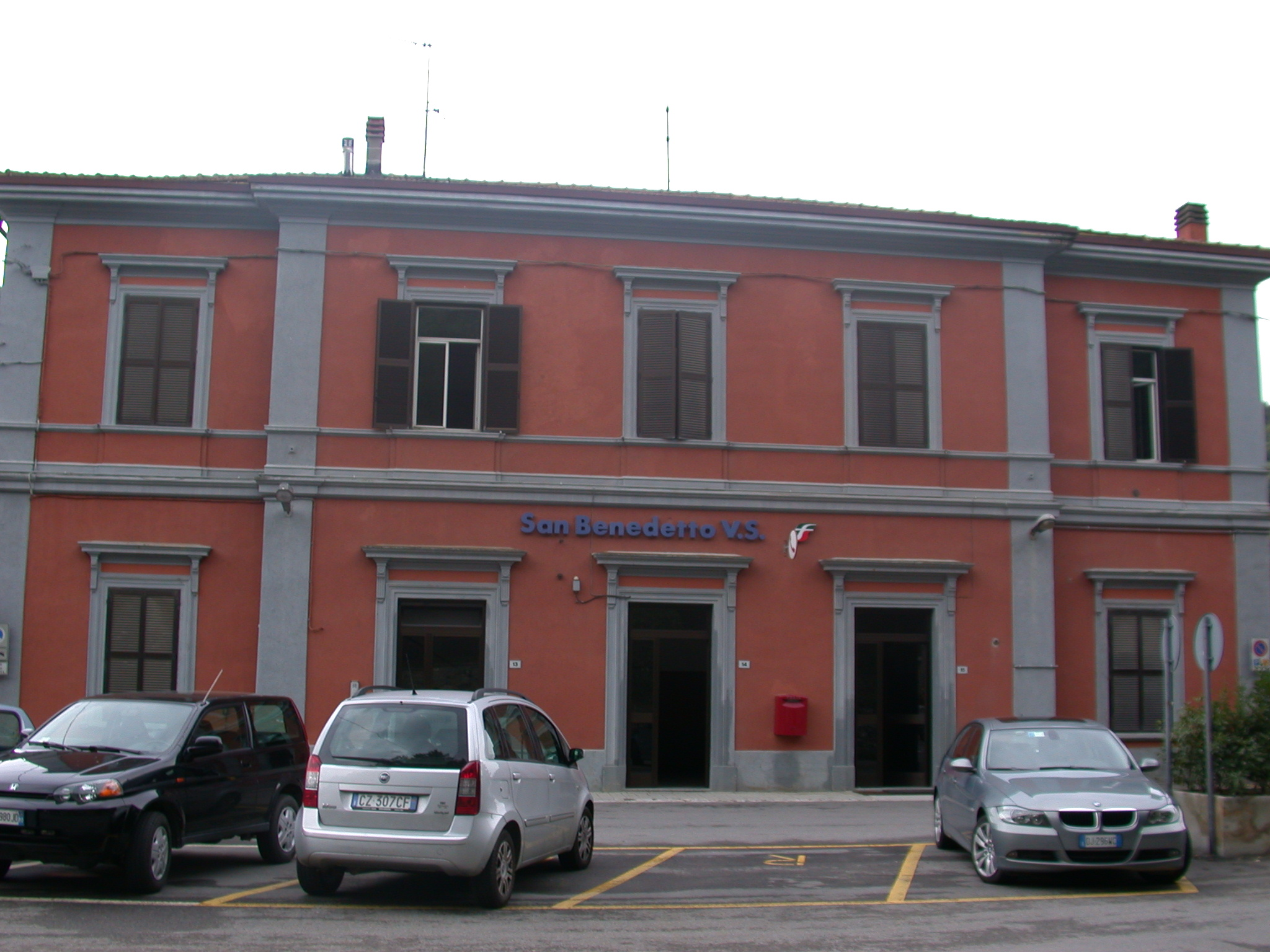

General information
- Location: San Benedetto Val di Sambro; Italy
- Coordinates: 44°12′59″N 11°11′23″E
- Operator: Rete Ferroviaria Italiana
- Line: Bologna–Florence
- Tracks: 3
- Train operators: Trenitalia Tper

Other information
- Classification: Silver

History
- Opened: 1934
Location
- Location within Emilia-Romagna Location within Northern Italy Location within Italy

San Benedetto Val di Sambro–Castiglione dei Pepoli (Italian: Stazione di San Benedetto Val di Sambro–Castiglione dei Pepoli) is a railway station in San Benedetto Val di Sambro, Italy. The station opened in 1934 and is located on the Bologna–Florence railway. Train services are operated by Trenitalia Tper.

The station is managed by Rete Ferroviaria Italiana (RFI), a subsidiary of Ferrovie dello Stato Italiane (FSI), Italy's state-owned rail company.

== History ==
The station opened in 1934, when the railway line itself was inaugurated.

== Features ==
The station consists of three tracks.

== Train services ==
The station is served by the following service(s):

- Suburban services (Treno suburbano) on line S1B, Bologna - San Benedetto Val di Sambro

== See also ==
- List of railway stations in Emilia-Romagna
- Bologna metropolitan railway service
