= Casalecchio Garibaldi railway station =

Railway station in Italy

Casalecchio Garibaldi

General information
- Location: Casalecchio di Reno, Emilia-Romagna; Italy
- Coordinates: 44.4830°N 11.2726°E
- Operator: Rete Ferroviaria Italiana
- Lines: Bologna-Porretta, Bologna-Vignola
- Tracks: 4
- Train operators: Trenitalia Tper
- Connections: Bologna buses

Other information
- Classification: Silver

History
- Opened: 2002
Location
- Location within Emilia-Romagna Location within Northern Italy Location within Italy

Casalecchio Garibaldi (Italian: Stazione di Casalecchio Garibaldi) is a railway station serving Casalecchio di Reno, in the region of Emilia-Romagna, northern Italy. The station opened in 2002 and is located on the Porrettana railway. It is also the terminus of the Bologna-Vignola railway. All train services are operated by Trenitalia Tper.

The station is currently managed by Rete Ferroviaria Italiana (RFI), a subsidiary of Ferrovie dello Stato Italiane (FSI), Italy's state-owned rail company.

== History ==
The station was inaugurated on 31 December 2002.

On September 30, 2003, a railway accident happened in the station, as regional train 11432, heading to Bologna Centrale, collided with a cement block after a red light was ignored due to human error. One person died.

== Location ==
Casalecchio Garibaldi railway station is situated north of the town centre.

== Features ==
The station consists of four tracks linked by an underpass.

== Train services ==
The station is served by the following service(s):

- Suburban services (Treno suburbano) on line S1A, Bologna - Porretta Terme
- Suburban services (Treno suburbano) on line S2A, Bologna - Vignola

== See also ==
- List of railway stations in Bologna
- List of railway stations in Emilia-Romagna
- Bologna metropolitan railway service
