= Casalecchio–Vignola railway =

Railway in Emilia-Romagna, Italy

Overview
- Native name: Ferrovia Casalecchio–Vignola
- Status: in use
- Owner: Ferrovie Emilia Romagna
- Locale: Emilia-Romagna, Italy
- Termini: Casalecchio di Reno; Vignola

Service
- Type: Heavy rail
- Operator(s): Trenitalia Tper

History
- Opened: 1938

Technical
- Line length: 24 km (15 mi)
- Track gauge: 1,435 mm (4 ft 8 1/2 in) standard gauge
- Electrification: 3 kV DC overhead line

The Casalecchio–Vignola railway is an Italian railway connecting Casalecchio di Reno to Vignola, in Emilia-Romagna.

== History ==
For decades, the Casalecchio–Vignola railway was used only as a freight line. Passenger service was reinstated on 13 September 2003 from Casalecchio Garibaldi railway station to Bazzano, Valsamoggia; on 19 September 2004, passenger service was reinstated on the remaining part of the line, between Bazzano and Vignola.
