= Pianoro =

- Comune
- Comune di Pianoro
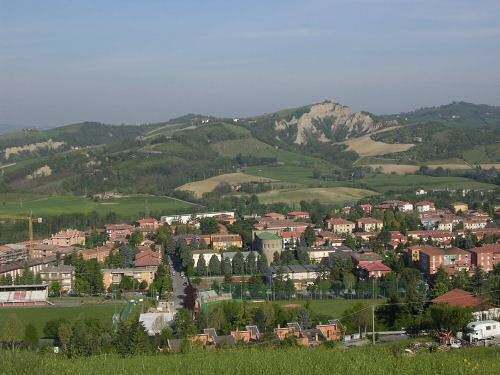

- Coat of arms

- Location within Italy Location within Emilia-Romagna
- Coordinates: 44°23′15″N 11°20′40″E
- Country: Italy
- Region: Emilia-Romagna
- Metropolitan city: Bologna (BO)
- Frazioni: Carteria, Gorgognano, Guzzano, Livergnano, Montecalvo, Montelungo, Musiano, Pian di Macina, Pianoro Nuovo, Pianoro Vecchio Rastignano, Sesto

Government
  - Mayor: Franca Filippini

Area
  - Total: 107 km^{2} (41 sq mi)
- Elevation: 200 m (660 ft)

Population (31 December 2019)
  - Total: 17,528
  - Density: 164/km^{2} (424/sq mi)
- Demonym: Pianoresi
- Time zone: UTC+1 (CET)
  - Summer (DST): UTC+2 (CEST)
- Postal code: 40065
- Dialing code: 051
- Patron saint: Assumption of Mary
- Saint day: August 15
- Website: Official website

Pianoro (Bolognese: Pianôr) is a town and comune in the province of Bologna in the Emilia-Romagna region of Italy, in the hills of the Tusco-Emilian Apennines, 200 metres (660 ft) above sea level.

Highway SS 65 connects the town to Bologna and Florence across the Apennines. Pianoro has a local railway station with connections to Florence and Bologna.

== History ==
According to legend the Etruscan king Ocno (also known as Bianore, mythical founder of Felsina and other cities), lived in the area. There is evidence of Celtic and Etruscan settlement at the Monte Bibele archeological site. The Roman presence in the area is seen in the names of local villages such as Sesto.

Bonifacio of Canossa, feudal lord of Pianoro during the 11th century, used to live in the Castle of Pianoro, subsequently demolished by the inhabitants of Bologna who accused the people of Pianoro of conspiracy.

During World War II the town was heavily bombed by Anglo-American forces. The Gothic Line was very close and in October 1944 there was a huge battle (in Livergnano) involving German, American forces and local partisans, leaving on the ground thousands of Anglo-American soldiers. Civil engineers reported that 98.5 percent of the town was destroyed during the battle. Many German soldiers are buried in the German Military Cemetery and War Memorial at the Futa pass, a few kilometers south of the town in the direction of Florence.

The town was rebuilt 3 kilometres (2 mi) north of the old site, toward Bologna. The new town is called Pianoro Nuovo (New Pianoro) and the remains of the old are called Pianoro Vecchio (Old Pianoro).

== Economy ==
Industries located in the area are primarily in the mechanical engineering and packaging (Marchesini Group, Romaco, MG2) and chemicals (Sayerlack S.r.l., part of Sherwin-Williams) sectors

== Landscape and tourism ==
The Gessi Bolognesi e Calanchi dell'Abbadessa Park, shared with San Lazzaro di Savena, contains an area of karstic topography with dolines, badlands and cliffs. There are many trails used by walkers, trekkers and bikers, including the Via degli Dei, a trail connecting Bologna to Florence across the Apennine Mountains.

Pianoro Cricket Club is a very successful cricket team, winning the Serie A tournament and the Italian Goblet several times, and the European Championship in 1995.

== Transportation ==
Pianoro is connected to Bologna and Florence by National Highway SS65 Futa and is located about 12 km from the former and 88 km from the latter.

Pianoro railway station is served by hourly Regional Trains between Bologna Centrale and Prato, two return trains Firenze Santa Maria Novella-Bologna Centrale and Firenze Campo di Marte-Bologna Centrale, as well as hourly Regional Trains Bologna Centrale-San Benedetto Val di Sambro as part of Route SFM1A of Bologna Suburban Railway Service.

TPER bus services offer frequent connections to/from Bologna, San Lazzaro di Savena and Monghidoro. The routes are the following:

- 13A Borgo Panigale-Ospedale Maggiore-Bologna Centre-San Ruffillo-Rastignano/Carteria di Sesto (extension to Pianoro on late trips on weekends)
- 96 Bologna Piazza Cavour-San Ruffillo-Rastignano-Carteria di Sesto-Pianoro (extension to Monghidoro on public holidays)
- 96A Bologna Piazza Cavour-San Ruffillo-Rastignano-Carteria di Sesto
- 126 San Lazzaro di Savena-Lago dei Castori-Pianoro
- 900 Bologna Bus Station-San Ruffillo-Rastignano-Carteria di Sesto-Pianoro-Loiano-Monghidoro
- 903 San Lazzaro di Savena-San Ruffillo-Rastignano-Carteria di Sesto-Pianoro
- 904 Bologna Via Azzurra-San Ruffillo-Rastignano-Carteria di Sesto-Pianoro
- 905 Bologna Via Vetulonia-San Ruffillo-Rastignano-Carteria di Sesto-Pianoro
- 906 Bologna Bus Station-San Ruffillo-Rastignano-Carteria di Sesto-Pianoro-Loiano-Monghidoro-Castel dell'Alpi
