= San Benedetto Val di Sambro =

- Comune
- Comune di San Benedetto Val di Sambro
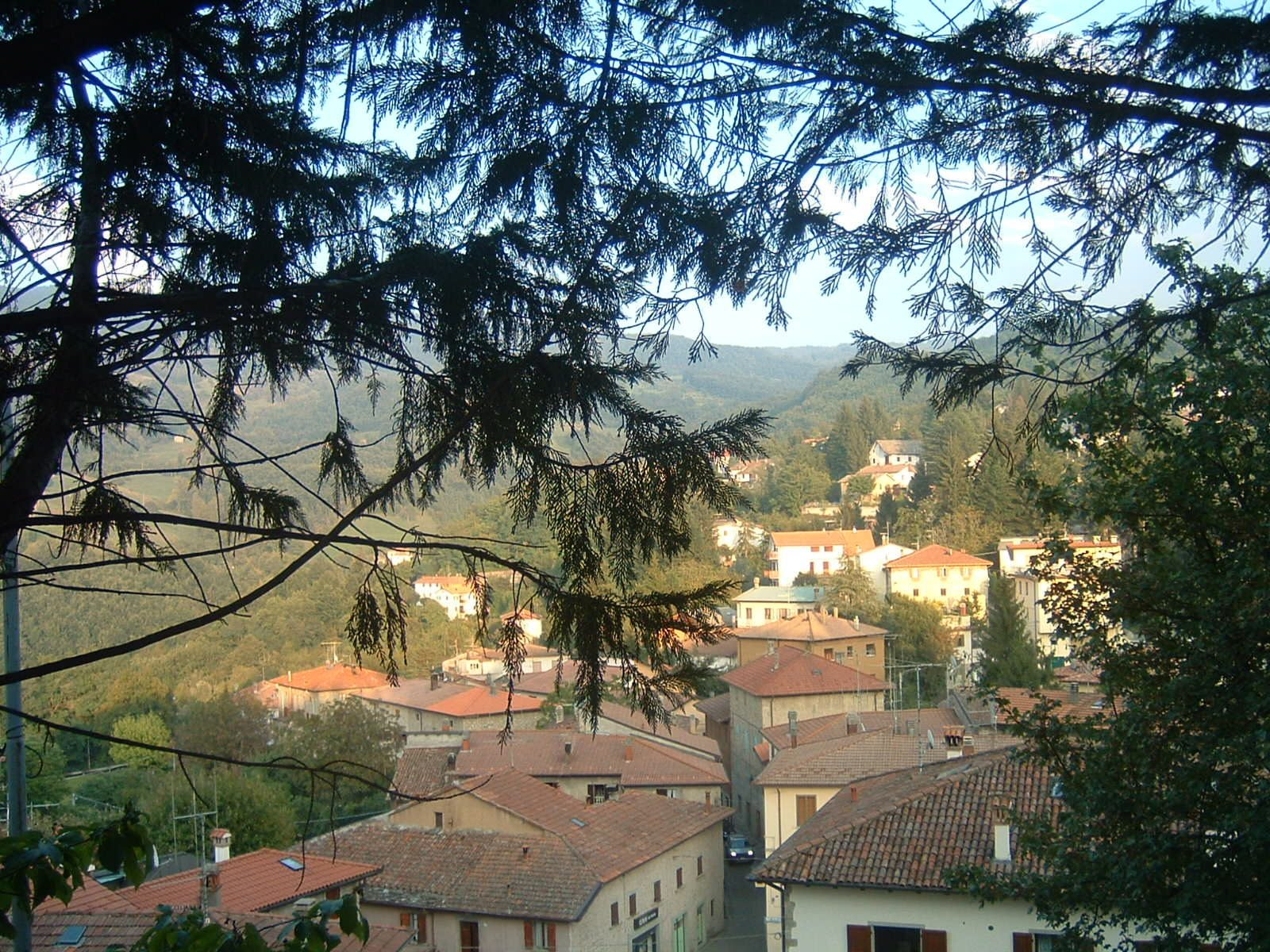

- Location within Italy Location within Emilia-Romagna
- Coordinates: 44°13′N 11°14′E
- Country: Italy
- Region: Emilia-Romagna
- Metropolitan city: Bologna (BO)
- Frazioni: Castel dell'Alpi, Cedrecchia, La Villa di Cedrecchia, Madonna dei Fornelli, Monteacuto Vallese, Montefredente, Pian del Voglio, Pian di Balestra, Qualto, Ripoli, Sant'Andrea, Zaccanesca

Government
  - Mayor: Alessandro Santoni

Area
  - Total: 66.47 km^{2} (25.66 sq mi)
- Elevation: 602 m (1,975 ft)

Population (31 December 2014)
  - Total: 4,348
  - Density: 65.41/km^{2} (169.4/sq mi)
- Demonym: Sanbenedettesi
- Time zone: UTC+1 (CET)
  - Summer (DST): UTC+2 (CEST)
- Postal code: 40048
- Dialing code: 0534
- Website: Official website

San Benedetto Val di Sambro (Medial Mountain Bolognese: San Bandàtt) is a comune (municipality) in the Metropolitan City of Bologna in the Italian region Emilia-Romagna, located about 35 kilometres (22 mi) southwest of Bologna.

The Italicus Express bombing and the Train 904 bombing happened at this location.
