= Ferrovie Emilia Romagna =

Italian railway company

Ferrovie Emilia Romagna s.r.l.
- Company type: Public benefit corporation, Limited company
- Industry: Transport
- Founded: 2002
- Headquarters: Bologna, Italy
- Area served: Emilia-Romagna
- Products: Rail transport Bus transport
- Number of employees: 840
- Website: Official website

Ferrovie Emilia Romagna (FER) is railway company serving the Emilia-Romagna region in Italy. The company also operates buses.

The company was formed in 1997 by acquisition by the Emilia-Romagna region of four previous state-owned railway companies:

- the Ferrovie Padane (FP, which managed the Ferrara–Codigoro railway);
- the Ferrovia Suzzara–Ferrara SpA (FSF);
- the Gestione Commissariale Governativa delle Ferrovie Venete - Ferrovia Bologna-Portomaggiore (FBP);
- the Gestione Commissariale Governativa delle Ferrovie Venete - Ferrovia Parma-Suzzara (FPS).

On 1 January 2008, it also acquired the railway branch of the ATCM of Modena, and, on 1 February 2009, Reggio Emilia's ACT, as well as FBV, becoming the only railway company in Emilia-Romagna.

Emilia-Romagna currently owns 59.44% of FER, the rest belonging to the provinces of Bologna, Mantua, Ferrara, Modena, Parma, Ravenna, Reggio Emilia and Rimini.

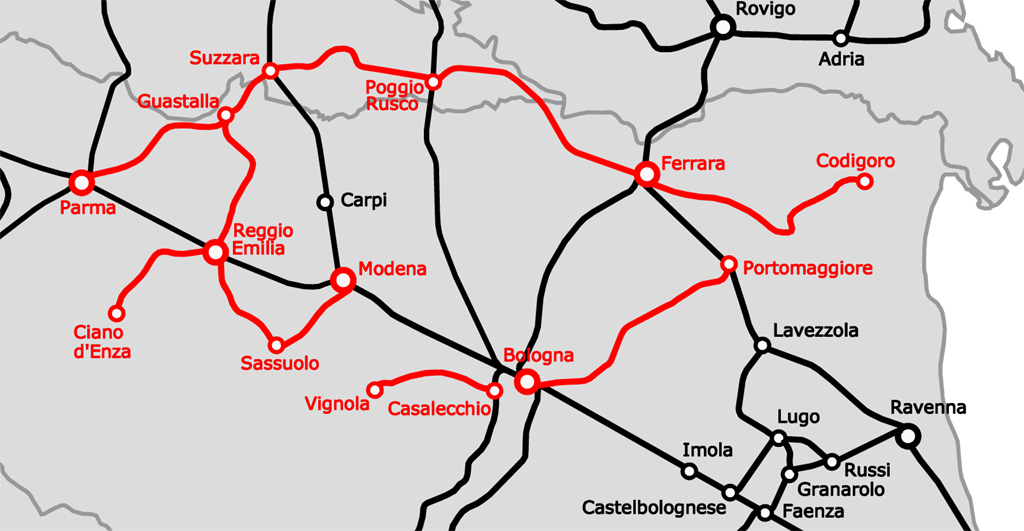
FER's railroad network.

== Services ==
Ferrovie Emilia Romagna is the infrastructure manager for the following railway lines:

- Parma–Suzzara
- Suzzara–Ferrara
- Ferrara–Codigoro–Pomposa
- Bologna–Portomaggiore–Dogato
- Modena–Sassuolo
- Reggio Emilia-Guastalla
- Reggio Emilia-Ciano d'Enza
- Reggio Emilia-Sassuolo
- Casalecchio–Vignola railway

In the past, FER also used to operate passenger services on the formerly listed lines as well as the following lines, owned by Rete Ferroviaria Italiana (RFI):

- Bologna–Ferrara
- Poggio Rusco–Bologna
- Modena–Mantua
- Ferrara–Rimini
- Parma–Fornovo
- Fornovo–Fidenza
- Bologna–Rimini–Pesaro
- Parma–Bologna

Railway transport is now carried out by a separate company, Trenitalia Tper.

FER also operates goods transports on its network and on the RFI one.

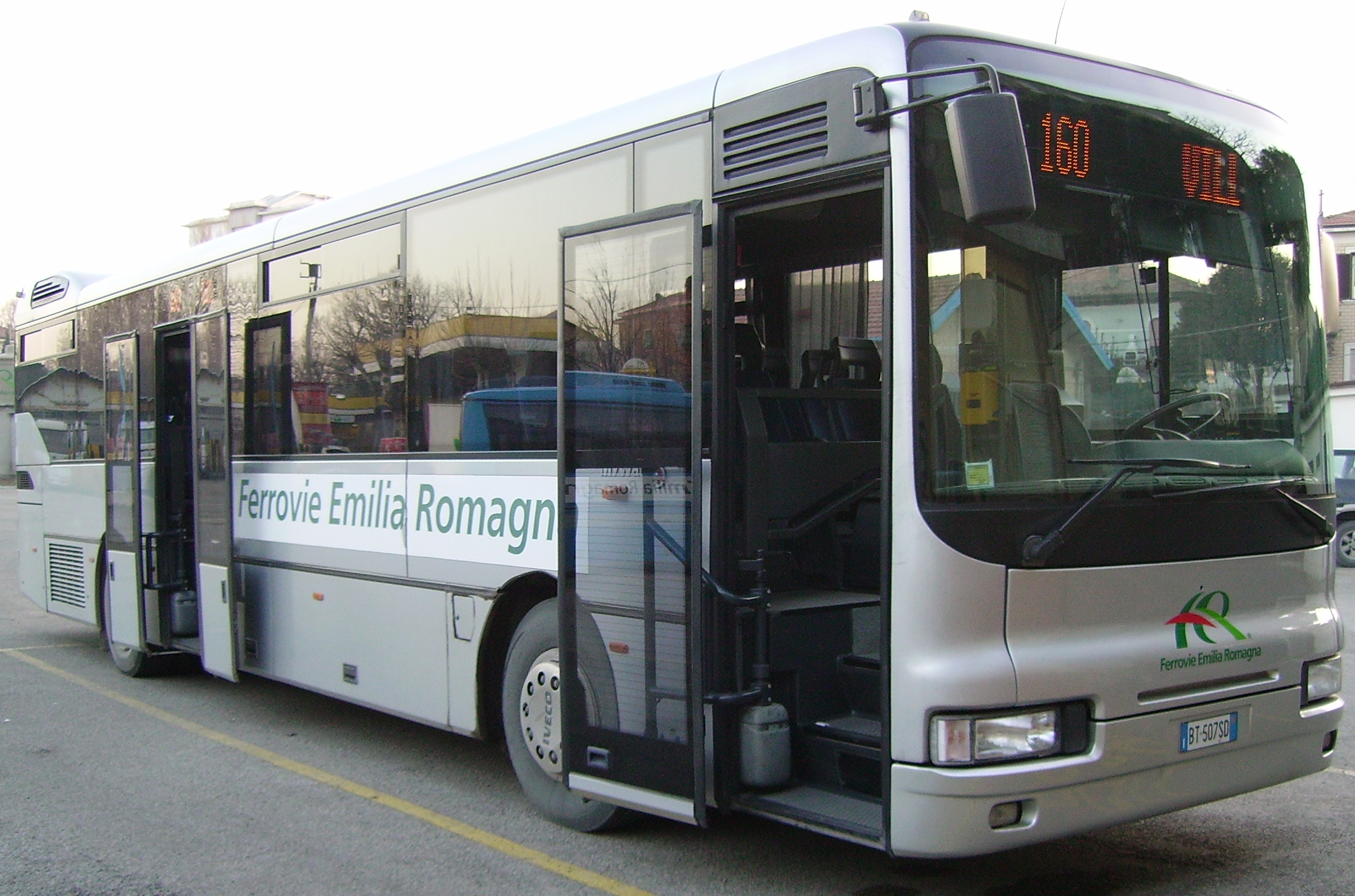
A FER IVECO MyWay in Rimini.

== Road transport ==
FER includes a road transport division, with buses connecting several cities in the provinces of Ferrara, Bologna and Rimini.

== See also ==
- Transportation in Italy
