= San Lazzaro di Savena =

San Lazzaro di Savena San Lâżer (Emilian)
- Comune
- Comune di San Lazzaro di Savena
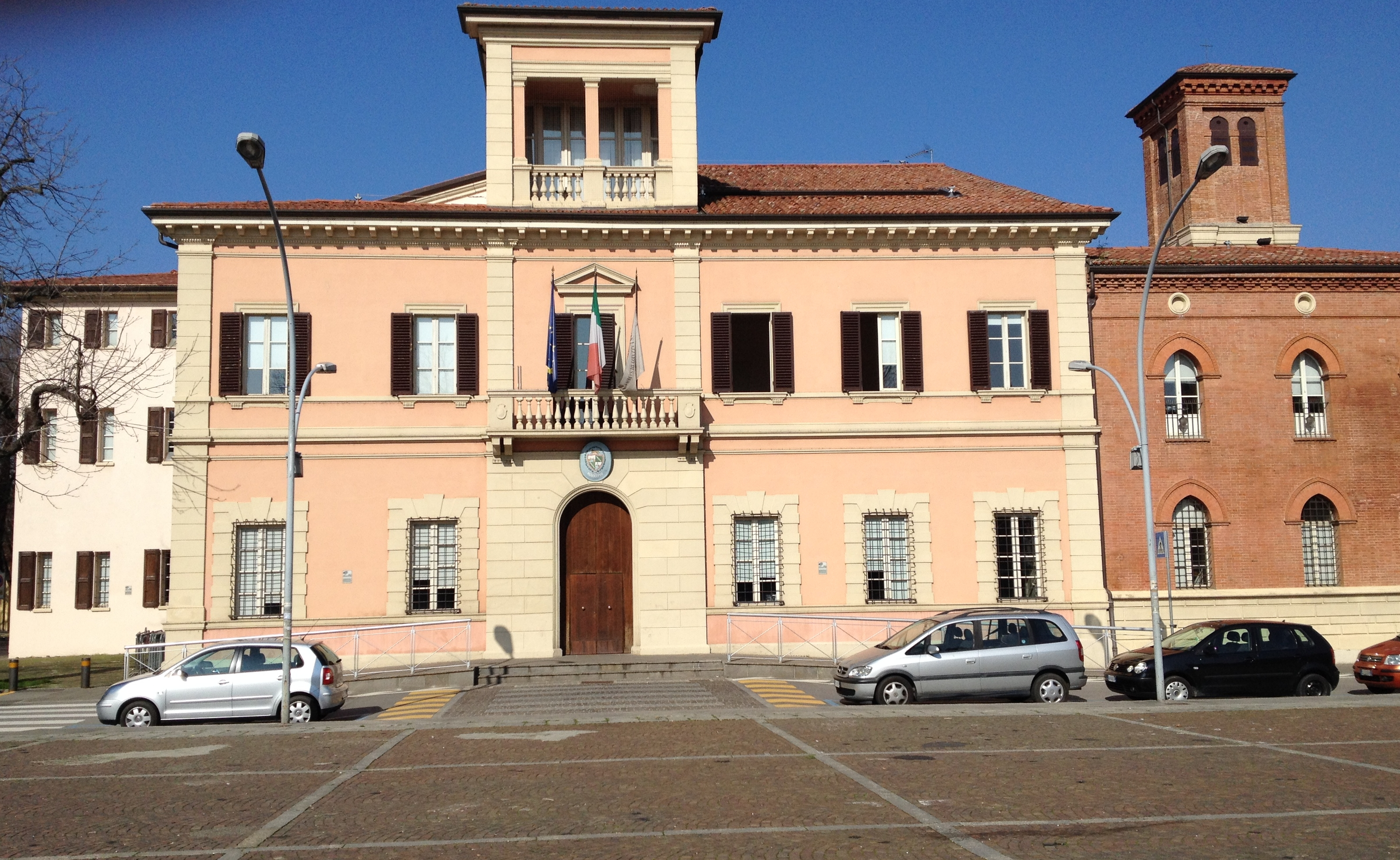
- Town hall.

- Coat of arms

- Location within Italy Location within Emilia-Romagna
- Coordinates: 44°28′15″N 11°24′30″E
- Country: Italy
- Region: Emilia-Romagna
- Metropolitan city: Bologna (BO)
- Frazioni: Borgatella, Castel de Britti, Cicogna, Colunga, Croara, Idice, Ponticella, Trappolone

Government
  - Mayor: Isabella Conti

Area
  - Total: 44 km^{2} (17 sq mi)
- Elevation: 62 m (203 ft)

Population (30 June 2017)
  - Total: 32,353
  - Density: 740/km^{2} (1,900/sq mi)
- Demonym: Sanlazzaresi
- Time zone: UTC+1 (CET)
  - Summer (DST): UTC+2 (CEST)
- Postal code: 40068
- Dialing code: 051
- Patron saint: St. Lazarus
- Saint day: December 17
- Website: Official website

San Lazzaro di Savena (Italian: [san ˈladdzaro di ˈsaːvena]; Bolognese: San Lâżer [saŋ ˈlaːðer] or San Lâżar) is an Italian comune (municipality) of some 32,000 inhabitants in the Metropolitan City of Bologna, Emilia-Romagna.

== Geography ==
The town is located on the Via Emilia, a major thoroughfare for town traffic, 6 kilometres (4 mi) from the city centre of Bologna towards the southeast.

The territory of the municipality extends towards the plain and at the foot of the first hills around Bologna. Some watercourses such as the Zena (creek), the Idice and the Savena, after which the town was named, flow through the town.

Within the territory of the municipality we can find the Spipola Cave with its doline and the chalky rock emergences of the Farneto and the Croara, that give shape to a karst compound (there are about 50 caves and natural hollows crossed by a 6-kilometre (4 mi) long hypogeous stream), protected by the Parco dei Gessi Bolognesi e Calanchi dell'Abbadessa (Natural park of Bologna's chalky rocks and the Abbess's gully).

== History ==
The area of San Lazzar has been inhabited since ancient times, as testified by findings from the Stone Age (stone implements) and the Bronze Age; along with nearby Castenaso, it witnessed a flourishing Villanovian civilization.

Documents state the site for the town once housed a lazzaretto or leprosarium. These were often located outside of cities where people could be segregated from the population.

The town was autonomous municipality in the Napoleonic Era (1810). It was afterwards readmitted to Bologna and gained back autonomy with the help of Carlo Berti Pichat after 1827.

Nowadays, after the building expansion of the 1970s, San Lazzaro is one of the most populated towns in the province of Bologna and is the main seat of a large number of factories.

== Main sights ==
In San Lazzaro the museum of prehistory "Luigi Donini" gathering findings of ancient times has been recently opened.

== Sports ==
The town's football team is A.C. Boca San Lazzaro, currently playing amateur football in Serie D after being relegated from Serie C2 after the 2006–07 season.

The former World Cup alpine ski racer Alberto Tomba was born in San Lazzaro di Savena.
