= Trenitalia Tper =

- Type: Società consortile a responsabilità limitata
- Predecessor: Trenitalia, TPER
- Founded: Bologna, Italy
- Headquarters: Bologna, Italy
- Area served: Emilia-Romagna
- Services: Train-line operation

Trenitalia Tper (TTX) is a company operating train services in the Emilia-Romagna region, in Italy, on railway lines overseen by both Rete Ferroviaria Italiana and Ferrovie Emilia Romagna (FER).

The current company was born on 1 January 2020 from the merger of the railway transport division of TPER, which at that time operated railway transportation services on the network operated by FER, and the division of Trenitalia operating local railway transportation services in Emilia-Romagna, on the network operated by RFI.

== Train services ==
Trenitalia Tper operates the following train services:

On RFI lines:

- SFM Bologna Route 1A Bologna-Porretta Terme
- SFM Bologna Route 3 Bologna-Poggio Rusco
- SFM Bologna Route 4A Bologna-Ferrara
- SFM Bologna Route 4B Bologna-Imola
- SFM Bologna Route 5 Bologna-Modena
- Bologna-Parma/Piacenza/Voghera/Genoa
- Parma-Milano
- (Parma)/Fidenza-Salsomaggiore
- (Bologna)/Modena-Carpi/Mantua/Verona
- Bologna-Rimini/Ancona
- Bologna-Ravenna/(Rimini)
- Faenza-Granarolo-Ravenna/Lavezzola
- Faenza-Borgo San Lorenzo/Florence
- Bologna-San Benedetto Sambro/Prato/(Florence)
- Bologna-Poggio Rusco/Verona/(Brennero)
- Bologna-San Pietro in Casale/Ferrara/Rovigo/Venice
- Rimini-Ravenna
- Ravenna-Ferrara
- Fidenza-Castelvetro-Cremona
- Parma-Borgo Val di Taro/Pontremoli/La Spezia
- Bologna-Marzabotto/Porretta Terme-Pistoia
- Parma-Brescia

On FER lines:

- SFM Bologna Route 2A Bologna Centrale-Vignola
- SFM Bologna Route 2B Bologna Centrale-Portomaggiore
- Modena-Sassuolo railway
- Reggio Emilia-Sassuolo railway
- Reggio Emilia-Guastalla railway
- Reggio Emilia-Ciano d'Enza railway
- Parma-Suzzara railway
- Ferrara-Codigoro railway
- Ferrara-Suzzara railway

The then Tper also used to operate the short-lived Portomaggiore-Dogato Railway, inaugurated in 2016 and closed less than one year later due to the low usage of trains, the lower frequencies of the trains (4 return journeys per day except on Sundays and Public Holiday), the 20 minutes of journey for just 13 km and one intermediate station and its lack of electrification, which caused lower speed and made impossible the usage of electric trains connecting to Bologna from Portomaggiore.

=== Traffic volume ===
	RFI network	FER network	Total
Passenger/day	126,251	23,004	149,255
Passenger/year	36,097,749	6,901,498	42,999,247
Trains/day	619	263	882
Replacement buses/day	30	101	131

Daily data refer to the average working day and are updated to november 2019.
