= Faenza railway station =

Railway station in Italy

Faenza
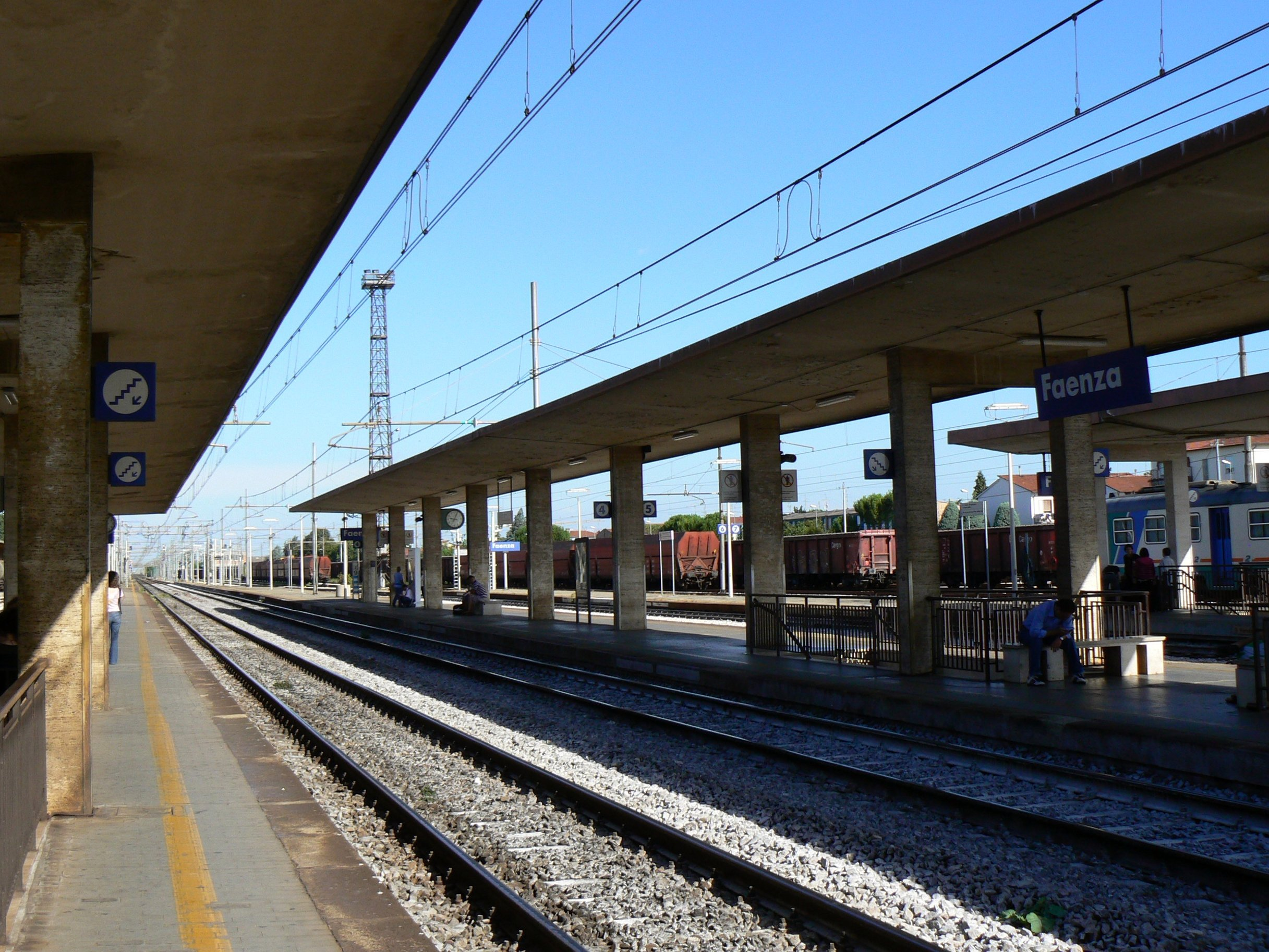
- View of the platforms.

General information
- Location: Piazza Cesare Battisti 6; 48018 Faenza RA; Faenza, Ravenna, Emilia-Romagna; Italy
- Coordinates: 44°17′36″N 11°52′59″E
- Operator: Rete Ferroviaria Italiana; Centostazioni
- Lines: Bologna–Ancona; Florence–Faenza; Faenza–Lavezzola; Faenza–Ravenna
- Distance: 49.062 km (30.486 mi) from Bologna Centrale
- Train operators: Trenitalia
- Connections: Urban buses

Construction
- Architect: Roberto Narducci

Other information
- Classification: Gold

History
- Opened: 1893; 133 years ago
- Rebuilt: 1948
Location
- Location within Emilia-Romagna Location within Northern Italy Location within Italy

Faenza railway station (Italian: Stazione di Faenza) serves the city and comune of Faenza, in the region of Emilia-Romagna, northern Italy. Opened in 1893, it forms part of the Bologna–Ancona railway, and is also a terminus of two secondary railways, linking Faenza with Lavezzola and with Ravenna, and with Florence, respectively.

The station is currently managed by Rete Ferroviaria Italiana (RFI). However, the commercial area of the passenger building is managed by Centostazioni. Train services are operated by Trenitalia. Each of these companies is a subsidiary of Ferrovie dello Stato (FS), Italy's state-owned rail company.

== Location ==
Faenza railway station is situated at Piazza Cesare Battisti, at the northern edge of the city centre.

== History ==
Faenza's original station was opened on 1 September 1861, together with the rest of the Bologna–Forlì section of the Bologna–Ancona railway. It was located to the east of the present station, near what is now Via Caldesi. In 1893, upon the inauguration of the Faentina railway to Florence, the present station was opened to replace the original station. However, the relocation of the station to a less central site necessitated the construction of a road link (Viale Alfredo Beccarini) between the city centre and the new facility. This led to the destruction of the city walls, and the distortion of the fabric of the urban village of Ganga. The 1893 passenger building was later destroyed by a bombing raid during World War II. It was rebuilt in 1948 by architect Roberto Narducci, who had already rebuilt several railway stations in the post-war period.

In 2009, Centostazioni and RFI completed a general restructuring of the property and the adaptation of technological systems in accordance with legal requirements. The proposed Metropolis project of the comune of Faenza would reclassify the space outside the station, and particularly the goods yard. It would also involve the construction of new housing estates (approximately 30,000 cubic meters in volume), and a new bus terminal and bike paths.

== Features ==
=== Passenger building ===
The passenger building is constructed in an evidently Italian rationalist style typical of the stations designed by Narducci. It is shaped like a rectangular parallelepiped on two levels.

At ground floor level, there are two large openings with rectangular sides. Upstairs, a large window illuminates and atrium inside the building. Extending laterally from each side of the passenger building are two asymmetrical single storey buildings in brick. These house the equipment rooms and the restaurant and bar. Beyond the outer end of each of these two buildings, there is another building on three levels, not open to travellers.

=== Station yard ===
Adjacent to the passenger building is the station yard. It has seven tracks used for passenger services. In detail:

- Track 1: on the main Faentina line, is used by Faentina line trains;
- Track 2: a loop siding, is also part of the Faentina line;
- Track 3: on the main Bologna–Ancona line, is generally used by even-numbered stopping trains (heading north);
- Track 4: also on the main Bologna–Ancona line, is generally used by odd-numbered stopping trains (southbound);
- Tracks 5, 6 and 7: are loop sidings generally used for trains terminating in Faenza, or for any overtaking.

All passenger tracks have a platform sheltered by a canopy. The platforms are connected with each other by a pedestrian underpass. There are also other tracks (without platforms and forming a separate area with similar tracks) used for the storage of rolling stock not in service. The rolling stock stored there includes many ALn 668 1900 series railcars, and several Minuetto series diesel multiple units. Both of these types are used on the lines radiating from Faenza.

== Train services ==
The station is served by the following service(s): (incomplete)

- High speed services (Frecciabianca) Milan - Parma - Bologna - Ancona - Pescara (- Foggia - Bari - Brindisi - Lecce) (only two Frecciabianca trains call at Faenza every day)
- Inter City Services Milan - Lodi - Piacenza - Fidenza - Parma - Reggio Emilia - Modena - Bologna - Faenza - Forlì - Cesena - Rimini - Riccione - Pesaro - Fano - Senigallia - Ancona - Civitanova Marche - San Benedetto del Tronto - Giulianova - Pescara - Vasto - Termoli - San Severo - Foggia - Barletta - Trani - Bisceglie - Molfetta - Bari/ - Brindisi - Lecce/Taranto
- Local (Regional) Services Faenza - Brisighella - Marradi - Borgo San Lorenzo - Vaglia - Florence
- Local (Regional) Services "Piacenza - Fidenza - Parma - Reggio Emilia - Modena - Bologna - Castel San Pietro Terme - Imola - Castel Bolognese - Faenza - Forlì - Cesena - Rimini - Riccione - Cattolica - Pesaro - Fano - Senigallia - Ancona (trains also leave from Milan and arrive in Pescara)
- Local (Regional) Services Faenza - Granarolo Faentino - Russi - Godo - Ravenna (used also by the trains R (Regional) 21457 Firenze Santa Maria Novella - Ravenna and Summer Season Regional Train Firenze Santa Maria Novella - Firenze Campo Marte - Pontassieve - Vicchio - Borgo San Lorenzo - Marradi - Brisighella - Faenza - Ravenna - Lido di Classe - Cervia - Cesenatico - Bellaria - Rimini)
- Local (Regional) Services Faenza - Granarolo Faentino - Cotignola - Lugo - Sant'Agata sul Santerno - Massalombarda - San Patrizio - Conselice - Lavezzola (infrequently used due to lack of proper passenger traffic from Faenza to Lavezzola, mainly used by commuters and students attending schools in Lugo and Faenza. There are 3 train services Lavezzola - Faenza and 2 Services Faenza - Lavezzola, with 5-round trip bus services between Faenza and Lavezzola)

== Passenger and train movements ==
The station has about 2.6 million passenger movements each year. The passenger trains calling at the station are regional, express, InterCity and Frecciabianca services. A total of about 140 passenger trains serve the station each day. Their main destinations are Bologna Centrale, Ancona, Rimini, Milano Centrale and Piacenza.

== See also ==
- History of rail transport in Italy
- List of railway stations in Emilia-Romagna
- Rail transport in Italy
- Railway stations in Italy
