= Cesena railway station =

Railway station in Emilia-Romagna, Italy

Cesena
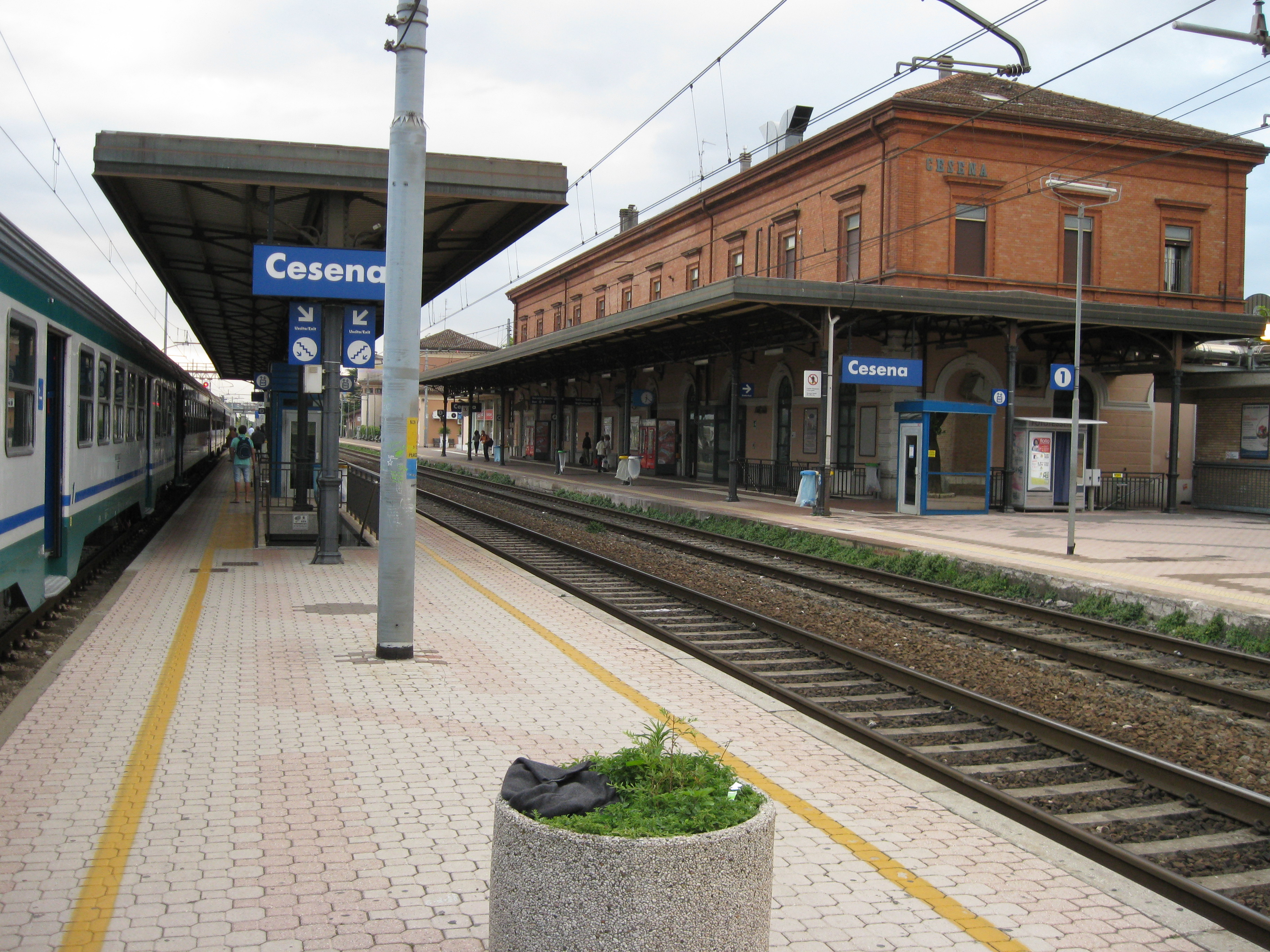
- View of the station platforms.

General information
- Location: Piazza Giorgio Sanguinetti; 47521 Cesena FC; Cesena, Forlì-Cesena, Emilia-Romagna; Italy
- Coordinates: 44°08′43″N 12°14′57″E
- Operator: Rete Ferroviaria Italiana; Centostazioni
- Line: Bologna–Ancona
- Distance: 82.624 km (51.340 mi) from Bologna Centrale
- Train operators: Trenitalia
- Connections: Urban buses

Other information
- Classification: Silver

History
- Opened: 1 September 1861; 164 years ago
Location
- Location within Emilia-Romagna Location within Northern Italy Location within Italy

Cesena railway station (Italian: Stazione di Cesena) serves the city and comune of Cesena, in the region of Emilia-Romagna, northern Italy. Opened in 1861, it forms part of the Bologna–Ancona railway.

The station is managed by Rete Ferroviaria Italiana (RFI), while the commercial area of the passenger building is managed by Centostazioni and train services are operated by Trenitalia. Each of these companies is a subsidiary of Ferrovie dello Stato (FS), Italy's state-owned rail company.

== Location ==
Cesena railway station is situated at Piazza Giorgio Sanguinetti, to the northeast of the city centre.

== History ==
The station was opened on 1 September 1861, together with the rest of the Bologna–Forlì section of the Bologna–Ancona railway.

== Features ==
The passenger building is a rectangular structure on two levels. On the ground floor, there are services for travellers and guests, and upstairs are offices. The ground floor is made of brick and has eleven arches. The upper floor is faced with brick and its front and back walls have eleven mullioned windows decorated with a cornice.

The station has a goods yard with adjoining goods shed. The tracks in the goods yard have been dismantled. A parking lot has been installed in their place, and the goods shed converted into a warehouse. The architecture of the goods shed is very similar to that of other Italian railway stations.

The station yard consists of four tracks all with a platform and shelter. The platforms are connected by a pedestrian underpass and each is equipped with an elevator.

== Passenger and train movements ==
The station has about 2.5 million passenger movements each year.

The passenger trains calling at the station are regional, express, InterCity, InterCity Night and Frecciarossa services.

A total of about 100 passenger trains serve the station each day. Their main destinations are Bologna Centrale, Ancona, Rimini and Piacenza.

== Interchange ==
In front of the passenger building there is the Cesena bus terminal. The operator of the bus services is Start Romagna. Urban bus lines 1, 3, 5, 6, 11, 12, 13, 21 and 41 make a stop at the railway station. Urban bus line 93 and suburban buses depart at the bus station, the main destinations of the suburban buses are Forlì and Forlimpopoli (line 92), Cesenatico (line 94), Savignano sul Rubicone (line 95) and Bagno di Romagna and Sarsina (line 138).

The car park at the site of the former goods yard has a private ample parking. There are two public parkings in front of the station (by payment) and several parking options in the surrounding area.

== Gallery ==
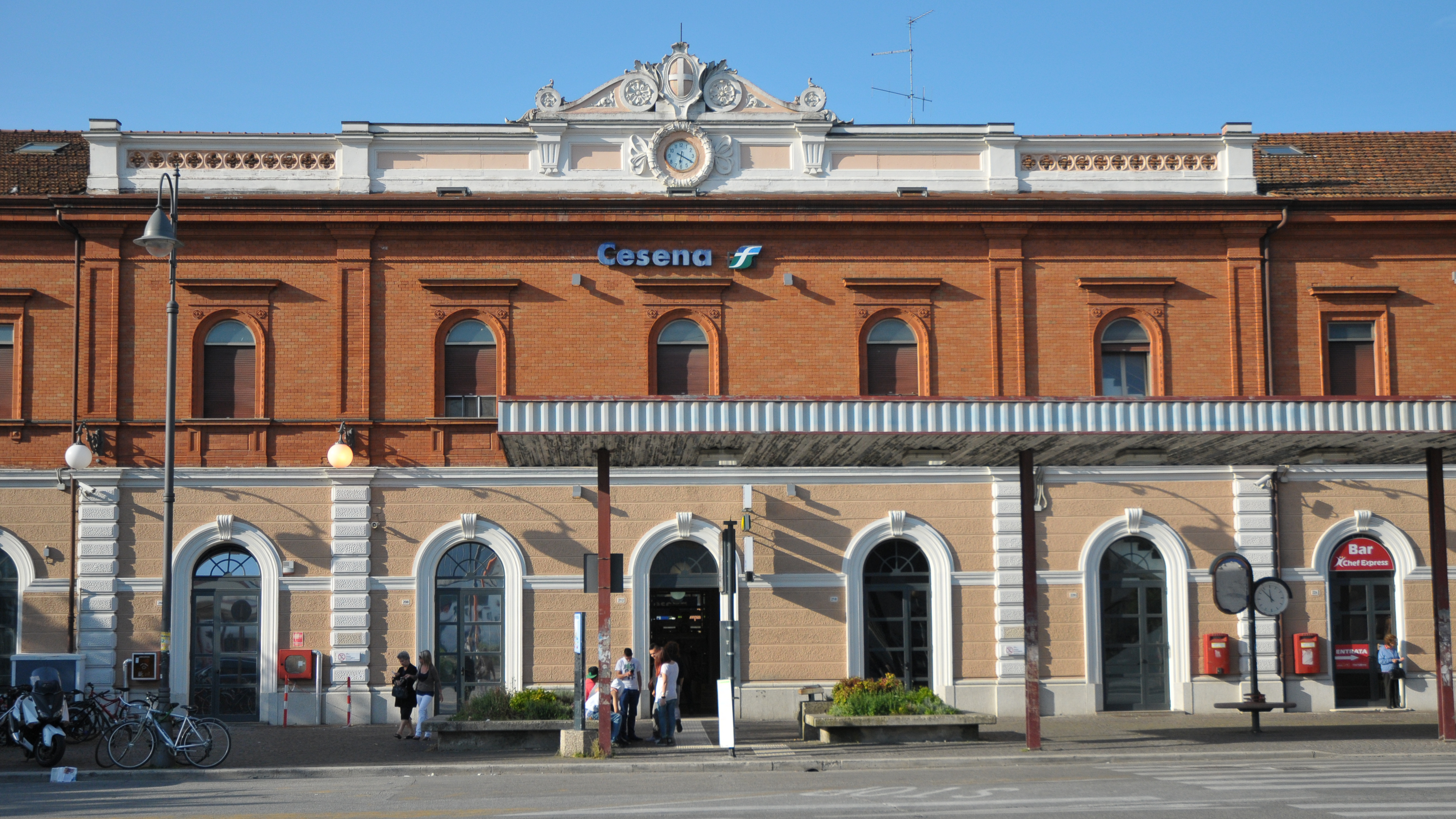
External facade of the passenger building.

== See also ==
- History of rail transport in Italy
- List of railway stations in Emilia-Romagna
- Rail transport in Italy
- Railway stations in Italy
