= Pesaro railway station =

Railway station in Pesaro, Italy

Pesaro
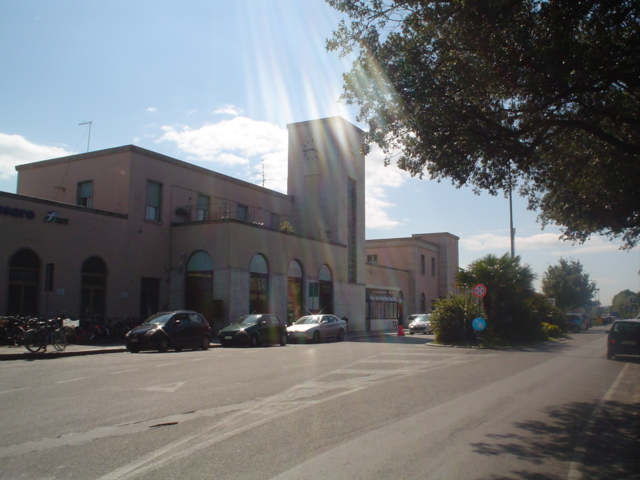
- View of the passenger building.

General information
- Location: Piazzale Giovanni Falcone e Paolo Borsellino; 61121 Pesaro PU; Pesaro, Pesaro e Urbino, Marche
- Coordinates: 43°54′22″N 12°54′22″E
- Operator: Rete Ferroviaria Italiana; Centostazioni
- Line: Bologna–Ancona
- Distance: 144.422 km (89.740 mi) from Bologna Centrale
- Train operators: Trenitalia
- Connections: Urban and suburban buses

Construction
- Architect: Roberto Narducci

Other information
- Classification: Gold

History
- Opened: 17 November 1861; 164 years ago
Location
- Location within Marche Location within Italy

Pesaro railway station (Italian: Stazione di Pesaro) serves the city and comune of Pesaro, in the region of Marche, central Italy. Opened in 1861, it forms part of the Bologna–Ancona railway.

The station is currently managed by Rete Ferroviaria Italiana (RFI). However, the commercial area of the passenger building is managed by Centostazioni. Train services are operated by Trenitalia. Each of these companies is a subsidiary of Ferrovie dello Stato (FS), Italy's state-owned rail company.

== Location ==
Pesaro railway station is situated at Piazzale Giovanni Falcone e Paolo Borsellino, southwest of the city centre.

== History ==
The station was opened on 17 November 1861, upon the inauguration of the final section of the Bologna–Ancona railway, between Rimini and Ancona.

The original operator of the station was the Società Generale delle Strade Ferrate Romane (English: Roman Railways General Company). In the reorganization of the Italian railways in 1865, the Kingdom of Italy entrusted its operation to the Società per le Strade Ferrate Meridionali (SFM) (English: Company for the Southern Railways). The latter company retained that function until the nationalization of the Italian railways in 1905.

During its history, the station has suffered severe setbacks, although the city has been constantly developing.

In 1935, the original passenger building was replaced by the present structure, designed by the architect Roberto Narducci.

== Features ==
The station yard has thirteen tracks, of which five are dedicated to passenger traffic.

The passenger tracks are served by three platforms accessible to users through a pedestrian underpass - lifts are available. The busiest passenger tracks are track 2, used by southbound trains, and track 3, which serves northbound trains. Tracks 1, 4 and 5 are used infrequently, generally for trains either originating or terminating in Pesaro.

== Gallery ==
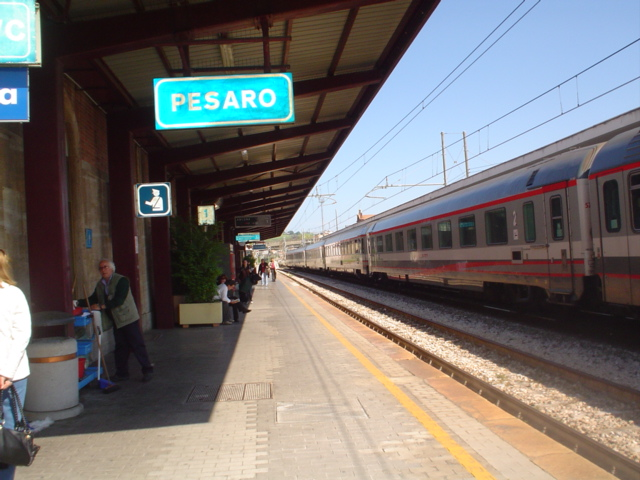
View of one of the platforms.

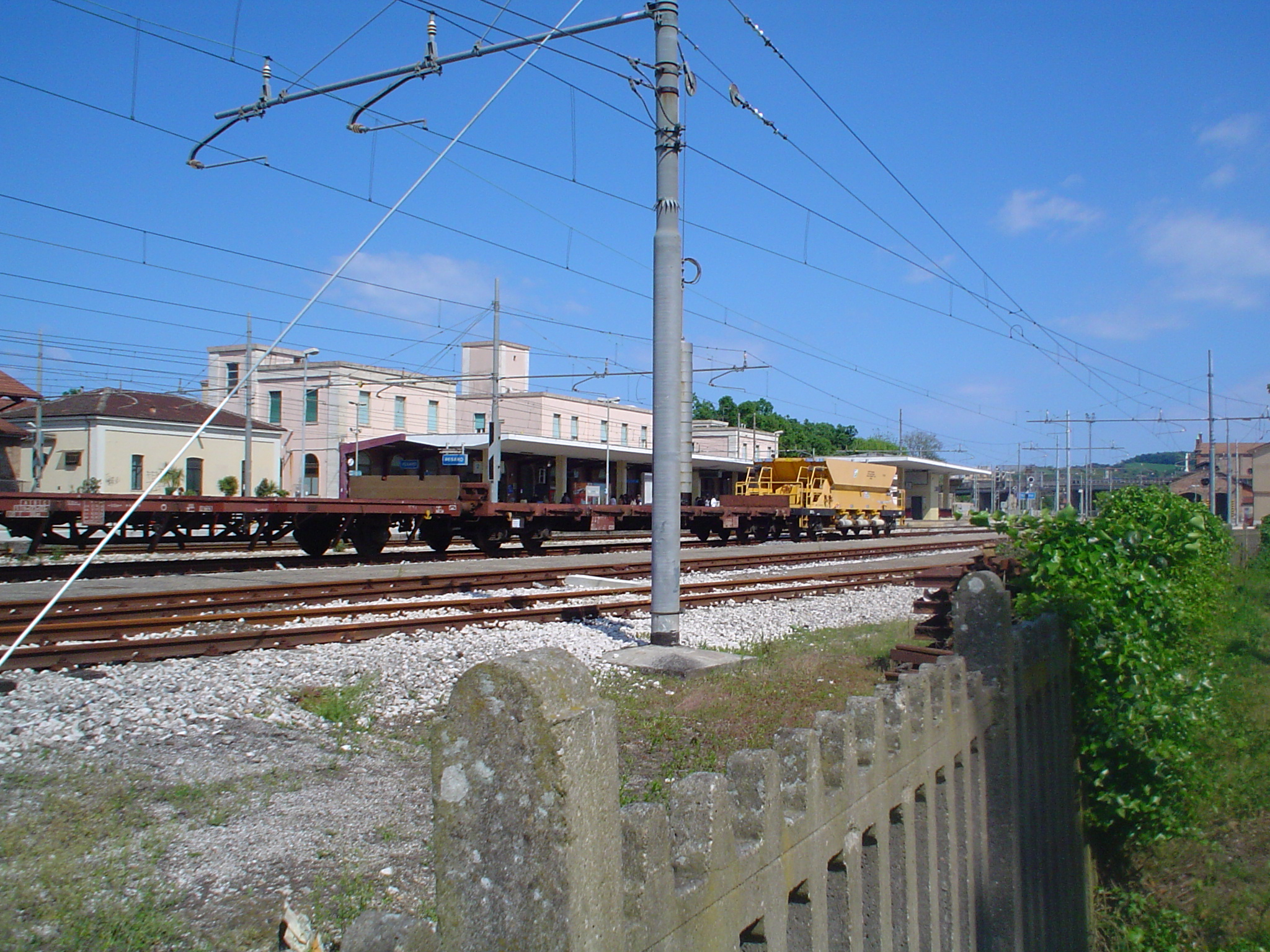
The station yard, with the passenger building in the background.

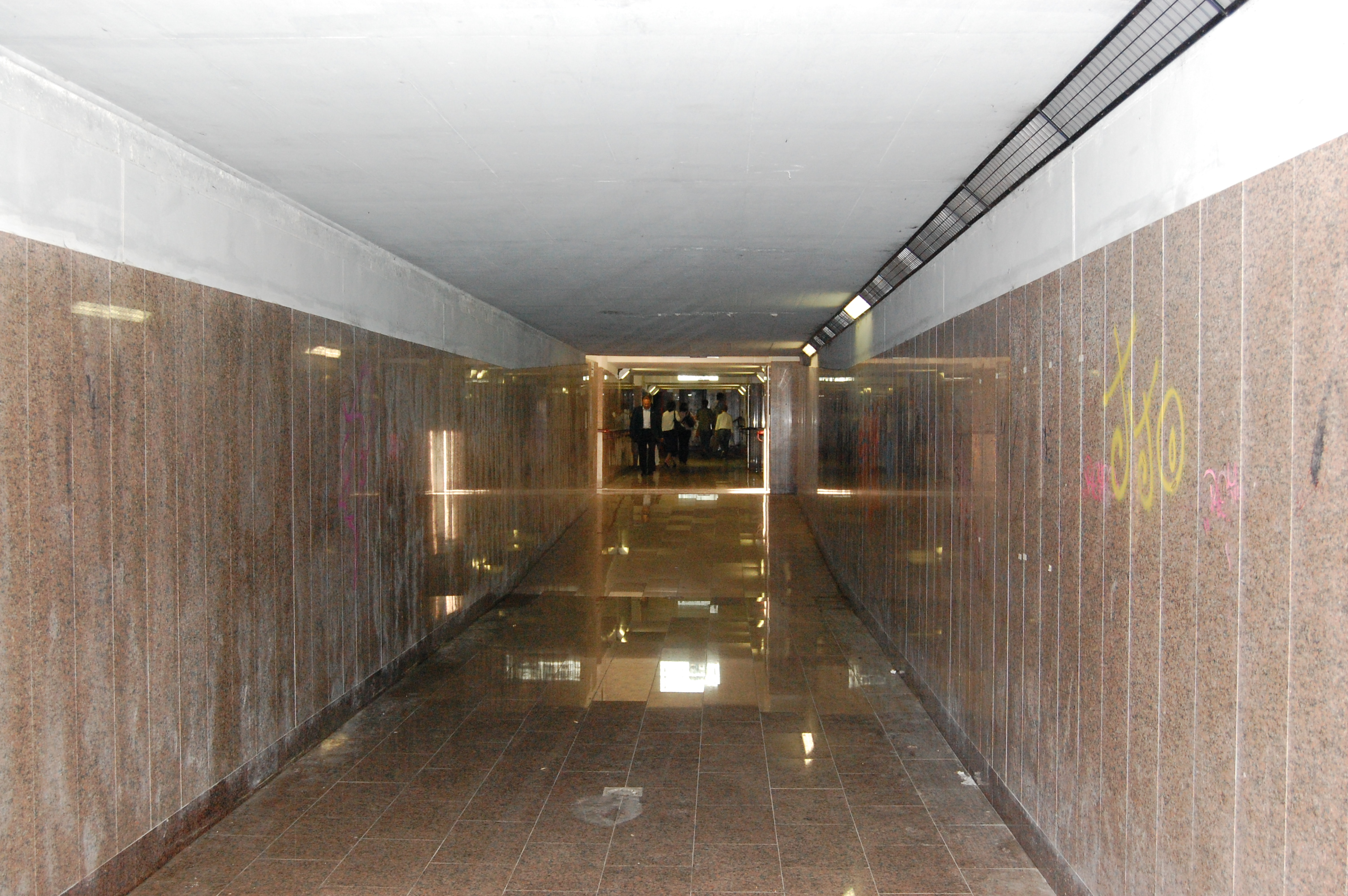
Inside the pedestrian underpass.

== Train services ==
The station is served by regional, InterCity and High speed trains.

The main origins and destinations of the regional trains are Bologna, Rimini, Milan and Ancona.

During the summer, the station serves as a terminus for treni del mare (English: trains of the sea): interregional trains organized by Ferrovie Emilia Romagna, and originating in Bergamo, Brescia, Cremona and Mantua.

The Intercity and High speed trains mostly link Pesaro with Roma Termini, Lecce, Ancona and Milan Central.

The station is served by the following services (incomplete):

- High speed services (FrecciaRossa) Turin - Milan - Bologna - Ancona - Pescara
- High speed services (FrecciArgento) Milan - Bologna - Ancona - Pescara - Bari
- Medium speed services (Frecciabianca) Milan - Parma - Bologna - Ancona - Pescara - Foggia - Bari - Brindisi - Lecce
- Medium speed services (Frecciabianca) Milan - Parma - Bologna - Ancona - Pescara - Foggia - Bari - Taranto
- Medium speed services (Frecciabianca) Turin - Parma - Bologna - Ancona - Pescara - Foggia - Bari - Brindisi - Lecce
- Medium speed services (Frecciabianca) Venice - Padua - Bologna - Ancona - Pescara - Foggia - Bari - Brindisi - Lecce
- Medium speed services (Frecciabianca) Ravenna - Rimini - Foligno - Terni - Rome
- Intercity services Bologna - Rimini - Ancona - Pescara - Foggia - Bari - Brindisi - Lecce
- Intercity services Bologna - Rimini - Ancona - Pescara - Foggia - Bari - Taranto
- Slow speed local services (Regionale) to other big and small cities in Marche and Emilia-Romagna (Fano, Rimini, Bologna, Piacenza, Ravenna, Ancona ecc...)

== Interchange ==
The station has a bus terminal for urban and suburban buses, with direct links to the city of Urbino.

== See also ==
- History of rail transport in Italy
- List of railway stations in the Marche
- Rail transport in Italy
- Railway stations in Italy
