= Ravenna railway station =

Railway station in Ravenna, Italy

Ravenna
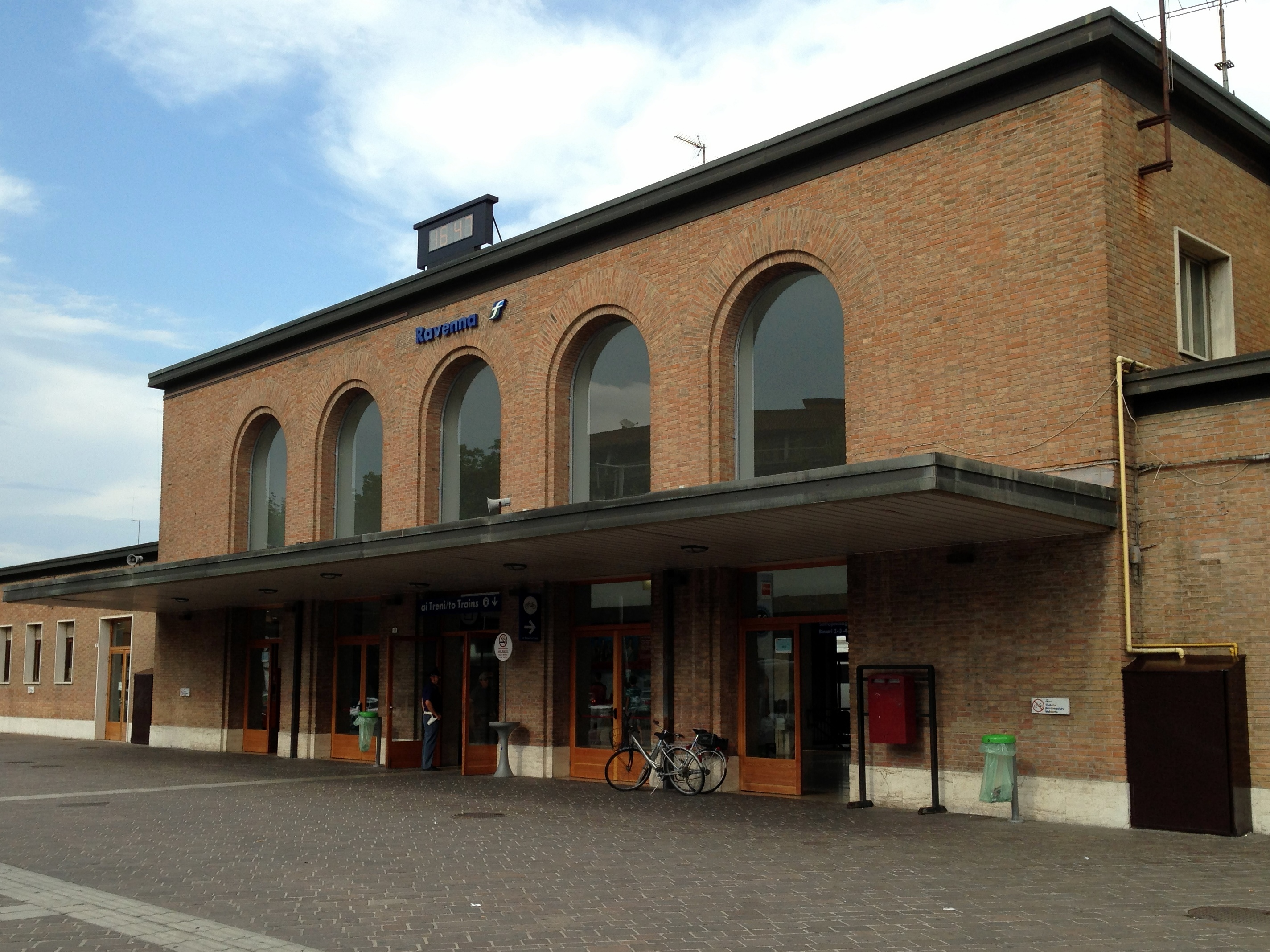

General information
- Location: Piazza Luigi Carlo Farini 13; 48121 Ravenna RA; Ravenna, Ravenna, Emilia-Romagna; Italy
- Coordinates: 44°25′09″N 12°12′29″E
- Operator: Rete Ferroviaria Italiana; Centostazioni
- Lines: Ferrara–Rimini; Ravenna–Faenza; Castelbolognese–Ravenna
- Distance: 72.620 km (45.124 mi) from Ferrara
- Platforms: 10 (7 island and 3 lateral)
- Train operators: Trenitalia
- Connections: Local buses

Other information
- Classification: Gold

History
- Opened: 23 August 1863; 163 years ago
Location
- Location within Emilia-Romagna Location within Northern Italy Location within Italy

Ravenna railway station (Italian: Stazione di Ravenna) serves the city and comune of Ravenna, in the region of Emilia-Romagna, northern Italy. Opened in 1863, it forms part of the Ferrara–Rimini railway, and is also a terminus of two secondary railways, linking Ravenna with Faenza and Castelbolognese, respectively.

The station is currently managed by Rete Ferroviaria Italiana (RFI). However, the commercial area of the passenger building is managed by Centostazioni. Train services are operated by Trenitalia. Each of these companies is a subsidiary of Ferrovie dello Stato (FS), Italy's state-owned rail company.

== Location ==
Ravenna railway station is situated at Piazza Luigi Carlo Farini, on the eastern side of the city centre.

== History ==
The station was opened on 23 August 1863, together with the rest of the Castelbolognese–Ravenna railway. Normal passenger services on that railway commenced the following day, 24 August 1863.

== Train services ==
=== Passenger movements ===
The station has about 3.5 million passenger movements each year.

=== Regional passenger services ===
The station is served by regional trains operating on the three railway lines:

- to Ferrara and Rimini, on the Ferrara–Ravenna–Rimini line;
- to Bologna Centrale, via the Castelbolognese line;
- to Faenza, terminus of the Faenza line.

The latter two lines run parallel as far as Russi.

=== Long-distance passenger services ===
Periodically, mainly in summer, Ravenna has long-distance passenger services, and in the past these have included international trains.

- Eurostar Fast Rome–Ravenna. operates daily.
- InterCityNotte Trieste–Lecce. Operates daily, with some exceptions.

The following links, however, are operated seasonally:

- Eurostar City Milano Centrale–Ravenna–Ancona. Runs on summer Saturdays and holidays.
- Eurostar Rome–Ravenna. Runs daily in summer.

=== Goods services ===
Given its proximity to the port, the station is the main hub for transporting goods to Melzo Scalo and Quadrante Europa.

== See also ==
- History of rail transport in Italy
- List of railway stations in Emilia-Romagna
- Rail transport in Italy
- Railway stations in Italy
