= Massa Centro railway station =

Railway station in Massa, Italy

Massa Centro
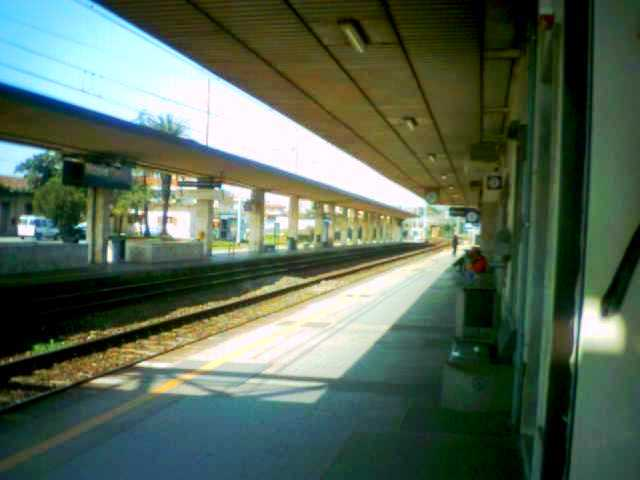
- View of the station platforms.

General information
- Location: Piazza IV Novembre; 54100 Massa MS; Massa, Massa and Carrara, Tuscany; Italy
- Coordinates: 44°01′26″N 10°08′10″E
- Operator: Rete Ferroviaria Italiana; Centostazioni
- Line: Pisa–La Spezia–Genoa
- Distance: 43.0 km (26.7 mi) from Pisa Centrale
- Train operators: Trenitalia
- Connections: Urban and suburban buses

Construction
- Architect: Roberto Narducci

Other information
- Classification: Silver

History
- Opened: 1 November 1862; 163 years ago
- Rebuilt: 1939
Location
- Location within Tuscany Location within Italy

Massa Centro railway station (Italian: Stazione di Massa Centro) serves the town and comune of Massa, in the region of Tuscany, central Italy. Opened in 1862, it forms part of the Pisa–La Spezia–Genoa railway.

The station is currently managed by Rete Ferroviaria Italiana (RFI). However, the commercial area of the passenger building is managed by Centostazioni. Train services to and from the station are operated by Trenitalia. Each of these companies is a subsidiary of Ferrovie dello Stato (FS), Italy's state-owned rail company.

== Location ==
Massa Centro railway station is situated in Piazza IV Novembre, to the south of the city centre.

== History ==
The station was opened on 1 November 1862, upon the inauguration of the Massa–Seravezza section of the Pisa–La Spezia–Genoa railway. Five months later, on 15 May 1863, the line was extended from Massa to Sarzana, in the neighbouring region of Liguria.

In 1939, the passenger building was renovated, to a design of the architect Roberto Narducci.

== Features ==
The station has three tracks for passengers and two through tracks for goods traffic.

Track 1 serves trains bound for Pisa Centrale, and Track 2 is for trains heading for La Spezia Centrale. Track 3 is used as both an exchange platform and for overtaking. The platforms facing all three tracks have long marble canopies and are connected by an underpass.

There are also many monitors showing arrival and departure information in real time.

== Passenger and train movements ==
The station has about 1.1 million passenger movements each year.

All regional trains passing through Massa Centro stop there, as do some InterCity, Eurostar City Italia and Eurostar Italia trains.

== Interchange ==
The station is also served by urban and suburban bus lines.

== See also ==
- History of rail transport in Italy
- List of railway stations in Tuscany
- Rail transport in Italy
- Railway stations in Italy
