= Centostazioni =

Subsidiary of Italian company Ferrovie dello Stato

Centostazioni Spa
- Type: Subsidiary
- Industry: Rail transport
- Founded: 8 February 2001
- Defunct: 16 July 2018
- Fate: Merged with Rete Ferroviaria Italiana (RFI)
- Headquarters: Rome, Italy
- Key people: Roberto Mannozzi, President; Sara Venturoni, CEO
- Products: Rail transport, transport, Services, more...
- Revenue: € 82,538,000 (2015)
- Parent: Ferrovie dello Stato
- Website: www.centostazioni.it

Centostazioni S.p.A. (English: 100 Stations) was a subsidiary of Italian holding company Ferrovie dello Stato Italiane. The company was created to redevelop and manage 103 medium-sized Italian railway stations.

== History ==
The company was founded in 2001 as Medie Stazioni S.p.A. (English: Medium Stations). A private consortium (Archimede) acquired a 40% stake in 2002. The shareholders in Archimede are Società Aeroporto di Venezia S.p.A. with 40.5%, Manutencoop S.c.a.r.l. with 40.5%, Investimenti Immobiliari Lombardi S.p.A. with 15%, and Pulitori ed Affini S.p.A. with 4%.

In 2019 100% of the companies shares were sold to Altarea SCA.

In 2026 Media One was awarded an eight-year contract to provide advertising across all former Centostazioni stations.

== List of Centostazioni stations by region ==
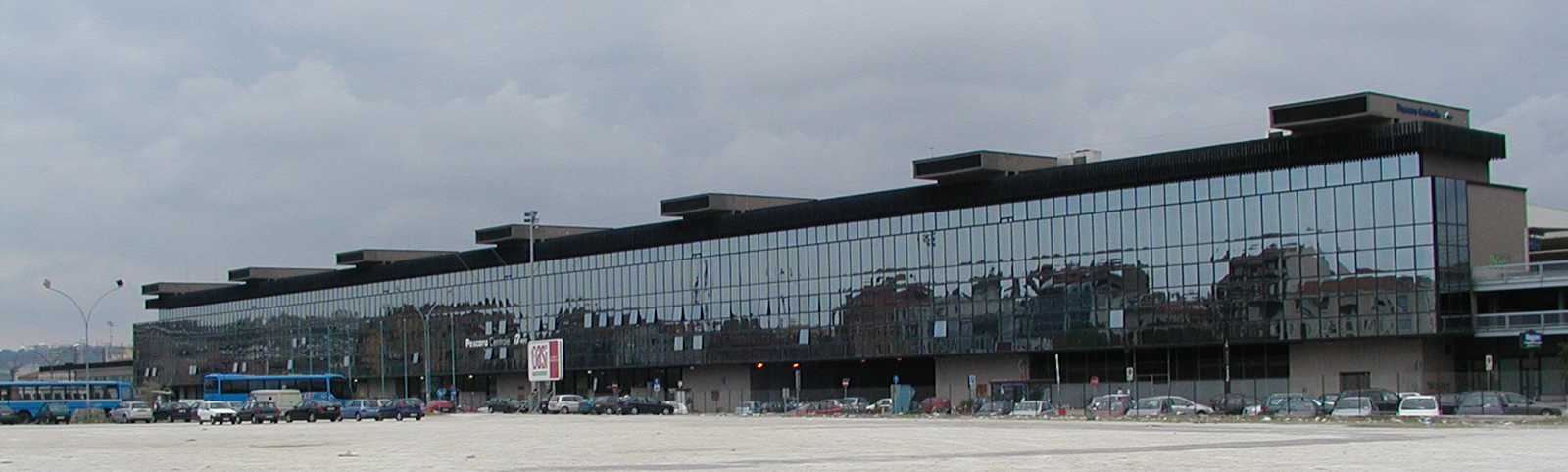
Pescara Centrale

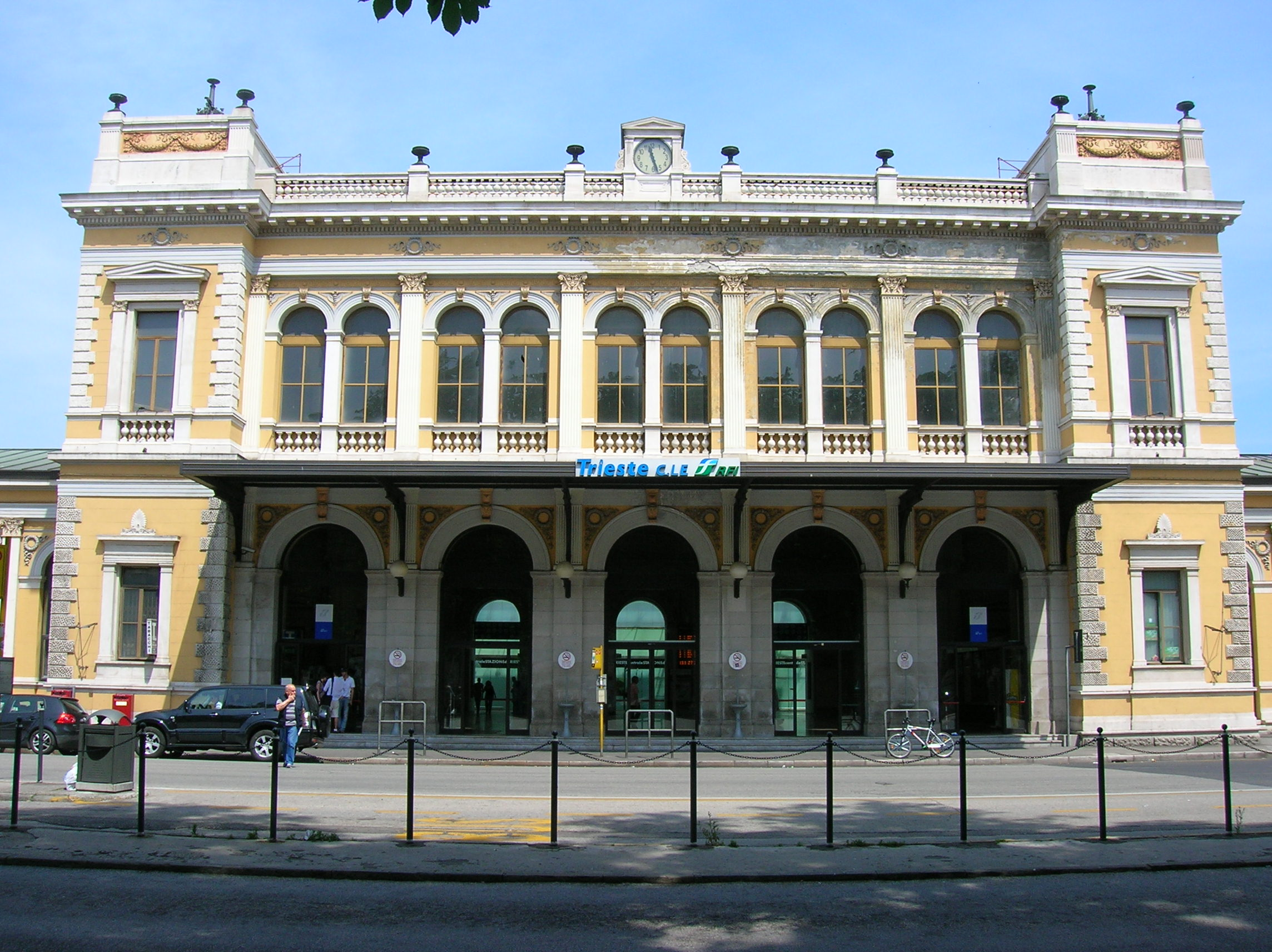
Trieste Centrale

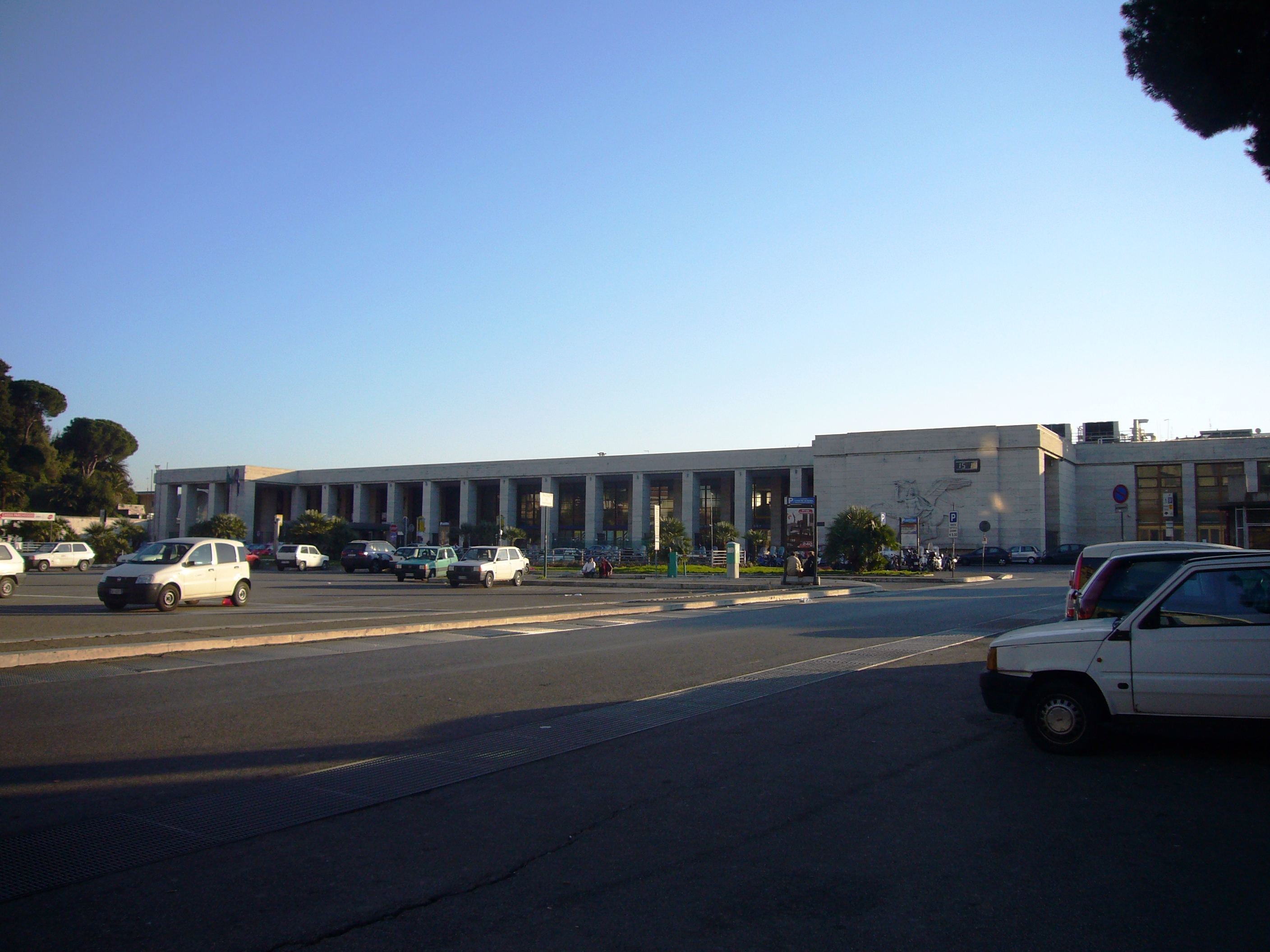
Roma Ostiense

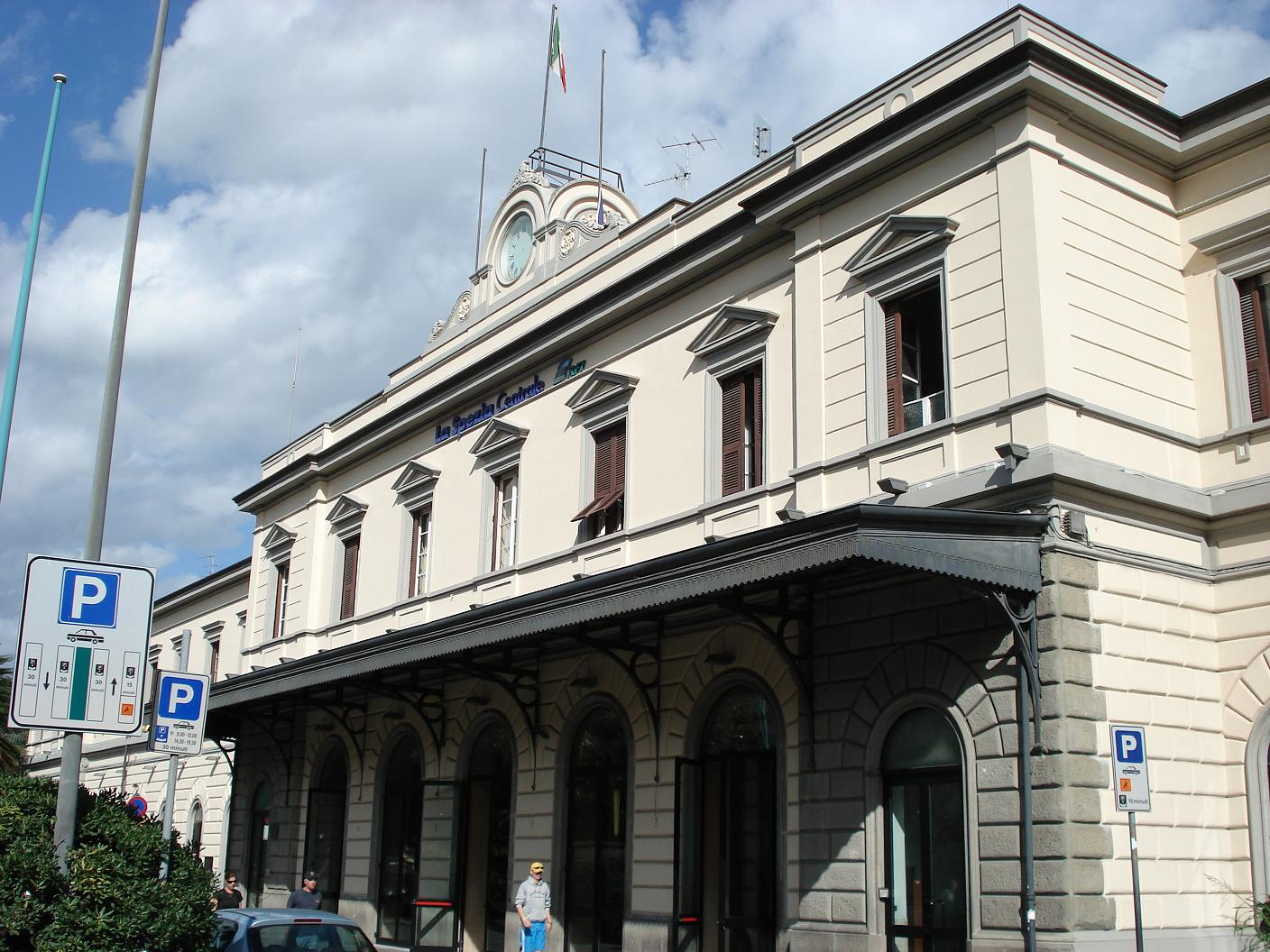
La Spezia Centrale

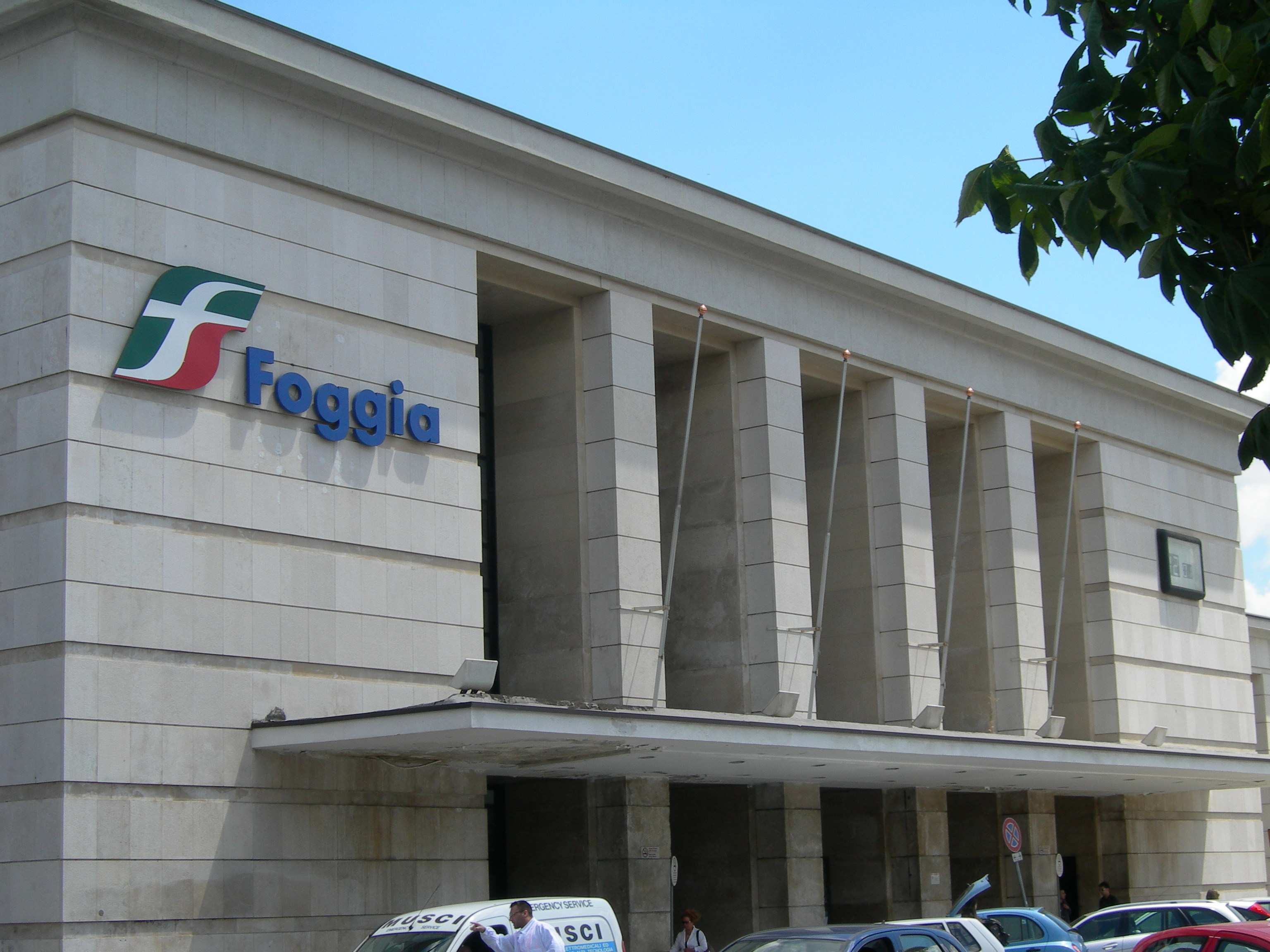
Foggia

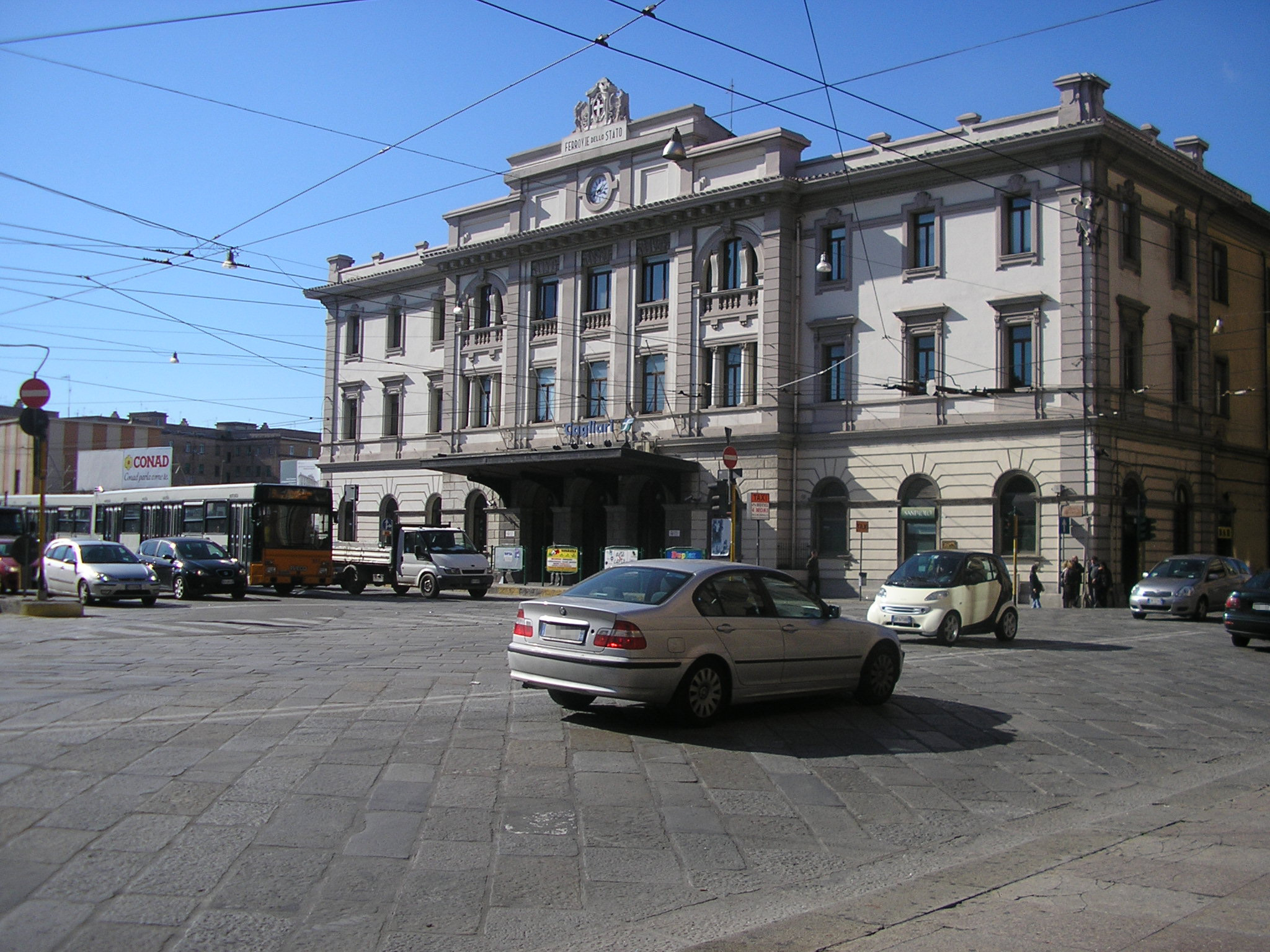
Cagliari

=== Abruzzo ===
- Chieti
- L'Aquila
- Pescara Centrale

=== Apulia ===
- Barletta
- Brindisi
- Foggia
- Lecce
- Taranto

=== Basilicata ===
- Potenza Centrale

=== Calabria ===
- Catanzaro Lido
- Reggio di Calabria Centrale
- Villa San Giovanni

=== Campania ===
- Benevento
- Caserta
- Napoli Campi Flegrei
- Napoli Mergellina
- Salerno

=== Emilia-Romagna ===
- Cesena
- Faenza
- Ferrara
- Forlì
- Modena
- Parma
- Piacenza
- Ravenna
- Reggio Emilia
- Rimini

=== Friuli-Venezia Giulia ===
- Gorizia Centrale
- Monfalcone
- Pordenone
- Trieste Centrale
- Udine

=== Lazio ===
- Civitavecchia
- Formia
- Orte
- Roma Ostiense
- Roma Trastevere

=== Liguria ===
- Chiavari
- Genova Sampierdarena
- Imperia Porto Maurizio
- La Spezia Centrale
- Rapallo
- Sanremo
- Savona
- Ventimiglia

=== Lombardy ===
- Bergamo
- Brescia
- Como San Giovanni
- Cremona
- Desenzano sul Garda-Sirmione
- Gallarate
- Lecco
- Lodi
- Mantua
- Milano Lambrate
- Milano Porta Garibaldi
- Milano Rogoredo
- Monza
- Pavia
- Sondrio
- Treviglio Centrale
- Varese
- Voghera

=== Marche ===
- Ancona
- Ascoli Piceno
- Macerata
- Pesaro

=== Molise ===
- Campobasso
- Termoli

=== Piedmont ===
- Alessandria
- Asti
- Biella San Paolo
- Cuneo
- Domodossola
- Novara
- Verbania-Pallanza
- Vercelli

=== Sardinia ===
- Cagliari

=== Sicily ===
- Catania Centrale
- Messina Centrale
- Messina Marittima

=== Tuscany ===
- Arezzo
- Grosseto
- Livorno Centrale
- Lucca
- Massa Centro
- Pisa Centrale
- Pistoia
- Prato Centrale
- Siena

=== Trentino-Alto Adige/Südtirol ===
- Bolzano
- Rovereto
- Trento

=== Umbria ===
- Assisi
- Foligno
- Perugia
- Terni

=== Aosta Valley ===
- Aosta

=== Veneto ===
- Belluno
- Castelfranco Veneto
- Padova
- Rovigo
- Treviso Centrale
- Vicenza

== See also ==
- Grandi Stazioni
- Rete Ferroviaria Italiana
