= Forlì railway station =

Railway station in Italy

Forlì
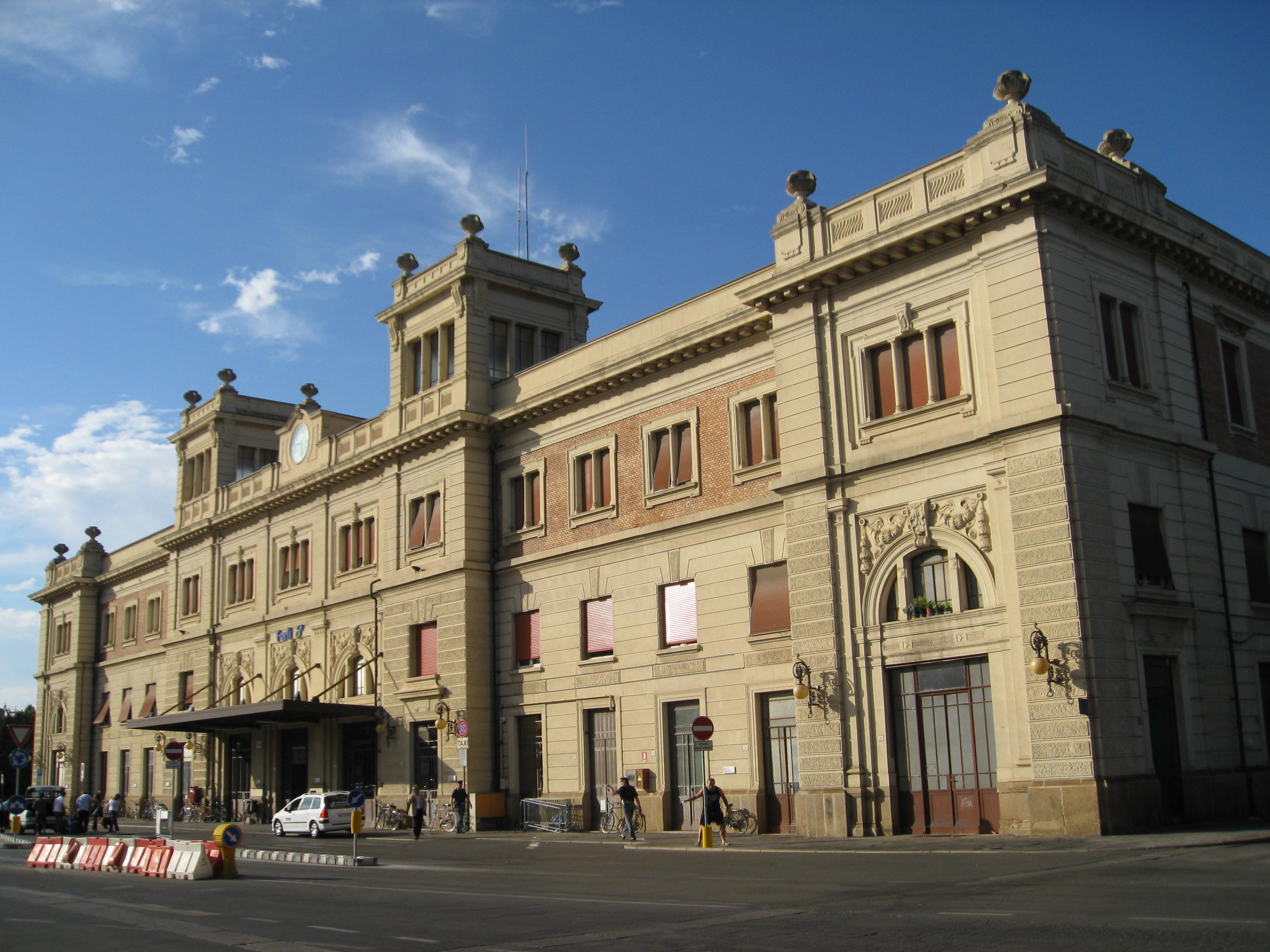
- The passenger building.

General information
- Location: Piazzale Martiri d'Ungheria; 47122 Forlì FC; Forlì, Forlì-Cesena, Emilia-Romagna; Italy
- Coordinates: 44°13′26″N 12°03′17″E
- Operator: Rete Ferroviaria Italiana; Centostazioni
- Line: Bologna–Ancona
- Distance: 64.773 km (40.248 mi) from Bologna Centrale
- Train operators: Trenitalia
- Connections: Urban buses

Other information
- Classification: Gold

History
- Opened: 1926; 100 years ago
Location
- Location within Emilia-Romagna Location within Northern Italy Location within Italy

Forlì railway station (Italian: Stazione di Forlì) serves the city and comune of Forlì, in the region of Emilia-Romagna, northern Italy. Opened in 1926, it forms part of the Bologna–Ancona railway.

The station is currently managed by Rete Ferroviaria Italiana (RFI). However, the commercial area of the passenger building is managed by Centostazioni. Train services are operated by Trenitalia. Each of these companies is a subsidiary of Ferrovie dello Stato (FS), Italy's state-owned rail company.

== Location ==
Forlì railway station is situated at Piazzale Martiri d'Ungheria, to the east of the city centre.

== History ==
Forlì's original station was opened on 1 September 1861, together with the rest of the Bologna–Forlì section of the Bologna–Ancona railway.

Just over one month later, on 5 October 1861, the new line was extended, from the original Forlì station to Rimini.

In 1926, the original station was closed and replaced by the present station.

A project of the engineer Enzo Bianchi, the present station is about 800 metres (870 yards) to the east of the original station.

== Features ==
The passenger building is rectangular in shape, and has three levels, but only the ground floor is open to the public.

The building consists of three sections. The central part has three arched entrances on either side. There are also two turrets on the Piazzale side, at each end of the section. Extending laterally from the central section are two symmetrical wings.

Adjacent to the passenger building is the station yard. It has three tracks used for passenger services. In detail:

- Track 1: on the main line, is used by odd-numbered stopping trains (southbound);
- Track 2: also on the main line, is used by even-numbered stopping trains (heading north);
- Track 3: a loop siding, is generally used for overtaking trains.

All passenger tracks have a platform sheltered by a canopy. The platforms and connected with each other by a pedestrian underpass.

There are also many other tracks (without platforms) that are used for goods services.

== Train services ==
The station is served by the following service(s):

- High speed services (Frecciarossa) Milan - Bologna - Ancona
- High speed services (Frecciabianca) Milan - Parma - Bologna - Ancona - Pescara (- Foggia - Bari)

== Passenger and train movements ==
The station has about 2.8 million passenger movements each year.

The passenger trains calling at the station are regional, express, InterCity, Frecciabianca services and one daily Frecciarossa high speed train pair.

A total of about 105 passenger trains serve the station each day. Their main destinations are Bologna Centrale, Ancona, Rimini, Milano Centrale and Piacenza.

== Interchange ==
Near the station, there is a large car park.

The station is also adjacent to a bus terminal. The operator of the bus service is ATR, and the main destination of the buses is Castrocaro.

== Gallery ==
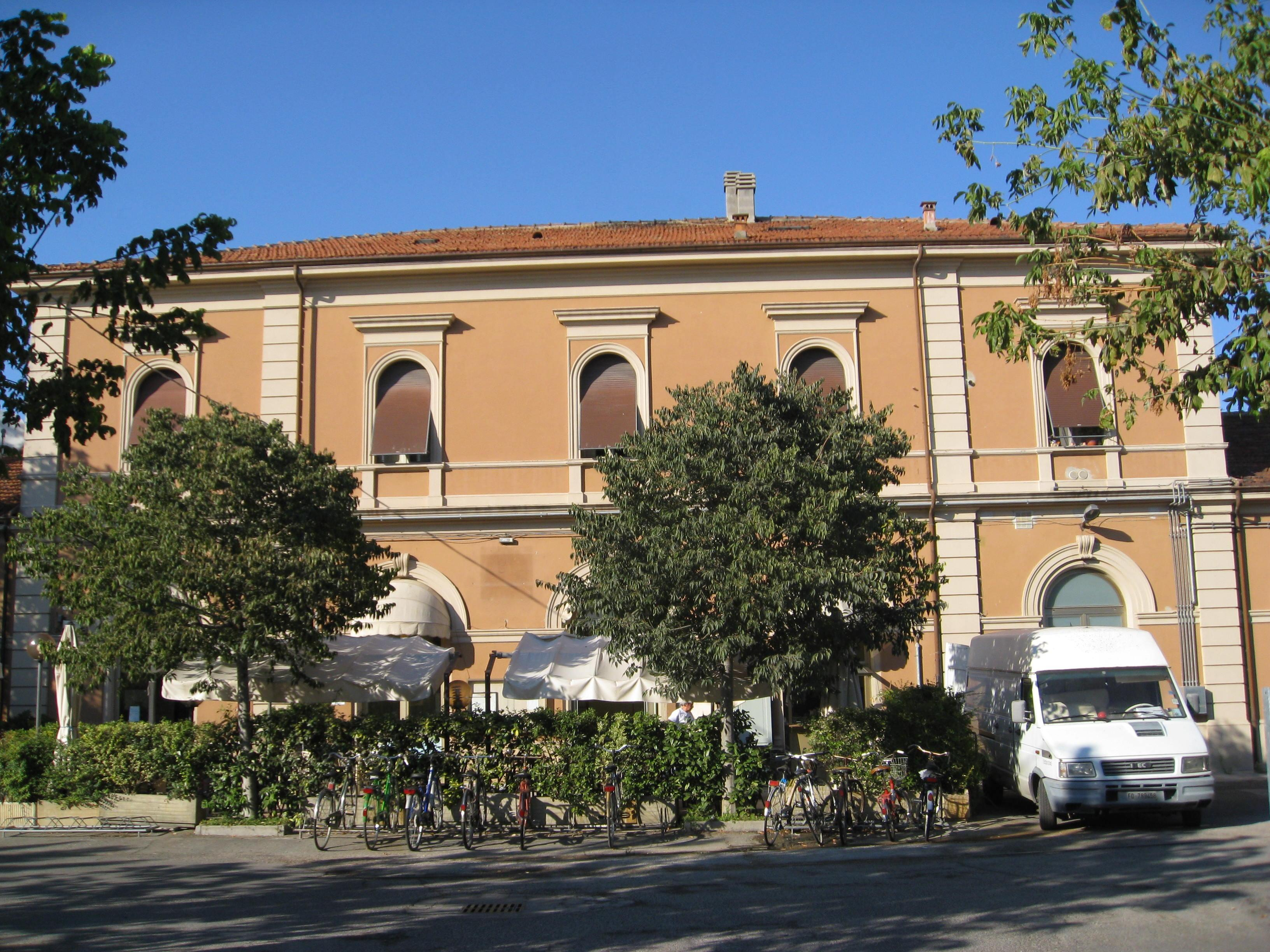
Passenger building of the original station.

== See also ==
- History of rail transport in Italy
- List of railway stations in Emilia-Romagna
- Rail transport in Italy
- Railway stations in Italy
