= Bologna–Ancona railway =

Key eastern Italian transport link

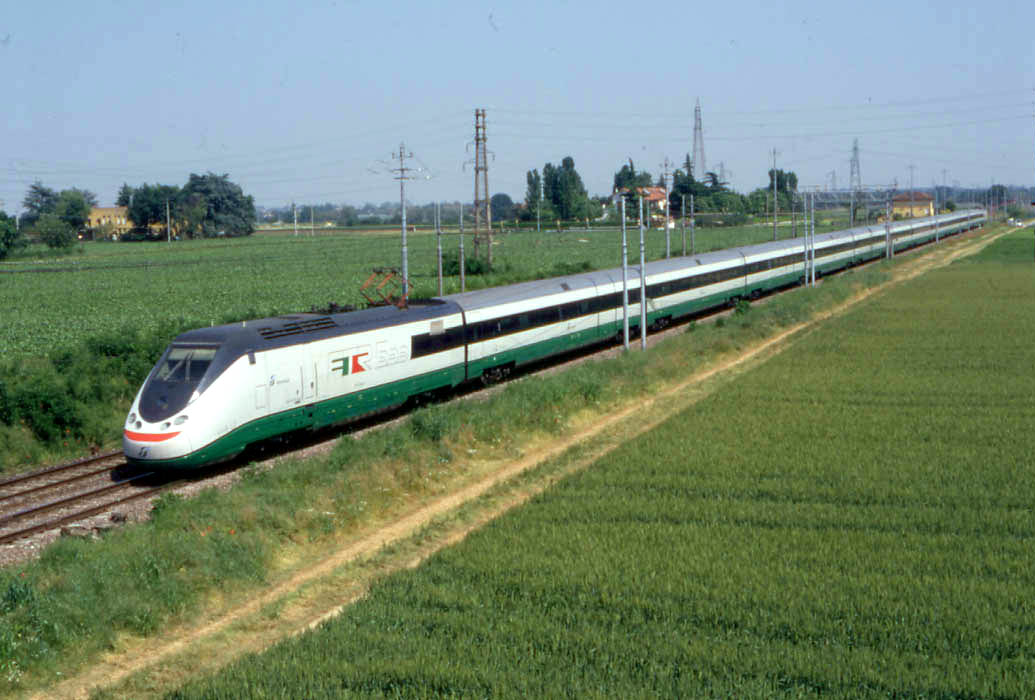
- The line by Imola

Overview
- Status: in use
- Owner: RFI
- Line number: 84, 102
- Locale: Italy
- Termini: Bologna Centrale; Ancona

Service
- Type: Heavy rail
- Operator(s): Trenitalia

History
- Opened: 1 September 1861 (Bologna Centrale–Forlì); 5 October 1861 (Forlì–Rimini); 17 November 1861 (Rimini–Ancona)

Technical
- Line length: 204 km (127 mi)
- Number of tracks: 2
- Track gauge: 1,435 mm (4 ft 8 1/2 in) standard gauge
- Electrification: 3 kV DC

The Bologna–Ancona railway is an Italian railway that connects the city of Bologna with the city of Ancona, passing through the Po Valley to Rimini and along the Adriatic coast for the rest of the line.

== History ==
=== Construction ===
Under a decree dated 21 May 1856, the government of the Papal States gave the Marquis of Casa Valdés a concession to build and operate a railway between the cities of Ancona and Bologna. The railway had to be built within ten years, and Casa Valdés' operation would last 95 years. On 16 August 1856, the government approved a statute founding the Società Generale delle Strade Ferrate Romane, established for the construction and operation of the Rome–Ancona railway and its extension to Bologna. This company was the concessionaire of the entire Pio Centrale railway network, in honour of Pope Pius IX, which also included the Romę–Civitavecchia railway. It would also support the Austrian Lombardy–Venetia railway network by extending the railway to Ferrara and up to the Po.

Track	Opened	Doubling
Bologna–Faenza	1 September 1861	1 June 1908
Faenza–Forlì	1 September 1861	1 March 1910
Forlì–Forlimpopoli	5 October 1861	1 September 1910
Forlimpopoli–Savignano	5 October 1861	18 February 1911
Savignano–Santarcangelo di R.	5 October 1861	20 December 1910
Santarcangelo di R.–Rimini	5 October 1861	15 September 1910
Rimini–Pesaro	17 November 1861	15 July 1914
Pesaro-Falconara Marittima	17 November 1861	20 September 1914
Falconara Marittima-Ancona	17 November 1861	16 September 1907

The railway was opened in phases in autumn 1861, when the territories were annexed to the Kingdom of Italy. The Bologna Centrale–Forlì section was opened on 1 September, the Forlì–Rimini section on 5 October, and the section to Ancona on 17 November. The opening ceremony for the line took place seven days earlier.

=== 19th century ===
The Bologna–Ancona railway, along with others belonging to Pio Centrale, were assigned to the Società per le Strade Ferrate Romane (Roman Railways Company) established following the reorganisation of the railways authorised by the law of 14 May 1865, no 2279. As a result of the Roman railways' poor financial condition, which worsened after the 1870s, the management of the line finally passed to the Società Italiana per le Strade Ferrate Meridionali, which retained it following the 1885 reorganisations. After 1905, following the enactment of the "Fortis" law, which nationalised the railways, the management passed to Ferrovie dello Stato.

In 1891, Riccione railway station was inaugurated: it had been a temporary stop from 1 January 1862, and a permanent stop from 1865.

=== 20th century ===
The line was doubled in the early twentieth century. Electrification at 3000 volts direct-current was inaugurated on 12 November 1938 and went into operation two days later.

=== 21st century ===
Between 2016 and 2018, Riccione's railway station was modernised as part of a programme to increase the speed of trains on the line. As part of the works, the northbound track was moved closer towards the seaside.

== Features ==
The line is a double-track line entirely electrified at 3000 volts DC. The management of the infrastructure is carried out by the Rete Ferroviaria Italiana.

It is equipped with the Sistema Controllo Marcia Treno train-control system, centralised traffic control (Bologna Centrale–Castelbolognese Riolo Terme) and Sistema di Comando e Controllo (Castelbolognese Riolo Terme-Ancona Marittima) (another form of centralised traffic control).

Operated by the central operations managers based in Bologna Centrale (Bologna Centrale–Rimini) and at Bari Lamasinata (Rimini–Ancona Marittima), it uses the RS4 Codici train protection system allowing maximum speeds between 115 and 200 km/h.

Since 2015, the line has been undergoing major infrastructure upgrading works, allowing the maximum speed of the line to be raised to 200 kilometres per hour (120 miles per hour).

=== Route ===
The line has a total length of 204 kilometres (127 miles), with an average gradient between 0% and 0.7%.

Throughout its course, the railway runs within a few kilometres of the A14 tolled highway, which serves the same route as the ancient Via Aemilia between Bologna and Rimini and the Via Flaminia between Rimini and Fano, and relieves the SS9 and SS16 state roads, which follow the Roman roads more closely.

==== Bologna to Rimini ====
The railway begins at Bologna Centrale. It continues southeast through Bologna San Vitale, passes under Bologna's belt railway, and crosses over the Bologna–Portomaggiore railway.

Leaving Bologna, the line continues southeast through the stations of San Lazzaro di Savena (opened in 2008), Ozzano dell'Emilia, Varignana, Castel San Pietro Terme, before reaching Imola. Until 1944, the line at Imola interchanged with the Massalombarda–Fontanelice railway, which it passed under after Imola.

Following Imola, the line continues southeast to the station of Castelbolognese-Riolo Terme, which was adjacent to the terminus of the Castelbolognese–Riolo Bagni railway that closed in 1933. At the next station, Faenza, the railway interchanges with the Florence–Faenza railway and the Faenza–Ravenna railway.

The next station is Forlì, whose original railway station was relocated south in 1927. The line continues southeast past the stations of Villa Selva (opened in 2009), Forlimpopoli-Bertinoro, Cesena, Gambettola, and Savignano sul Rubicone.

After passing Savignano, the line takes a southerly bearing, and curves on an easterly course before reaching the station of Santarcangelo di Romagna. Here, the railway was intended to interchange with the Subappennine railway, a cancelled railway project that would have connected Santarcangelo to Fabriano via San Leo, Urbino, and Pergola. Past Santarcangelo, the line runs through Rimini Fiera, whose railway station opened in 2004, before turning southeast to reach Rimini railway station, where the line interchanges with the Ferrara–Rimini railway. Rimini was also the terminus of two disused lines: the Rimini–Novafeltria railway, in operation between 1916 and 1960, which terminated at the adjacent Rimini Centrale; and the Rimini–San Marino railway, which operated between 1932 and 1944.

==== Rimini to Ancona ====
After Rimini railway station, the line bears southeast parallel to the Adriatic Sea. It runs adjacent to Metromare, a segregated trolleybus rapid transit line between Rimini and Riccione that opened in 2019, with fifteen intermediate stops. Until the 1960s, the railway crossed the Torrente Ausa just south of Rimini's railway station: the Ausa was only diverted northwards to empty into the Marecchia in the 1960s. Rimini includes a locomotive depot with a workshop, likely established immediately after the railway's opening.

The line continues through the railway stations of Rimini Miramare, Riccione (opened 1891, replacing an 1862 temporary stop that was made permanent in 1865), Misano Adriatico (opened 1949), and Cattolica-San Giovanni-Gabicce.

After crossing the border between Emilia-Romagna and the Marche, it used to stop at Gradara railway station. The line reaches its maximum grade of 1.2% on the approach to the Cattolica tunnel.

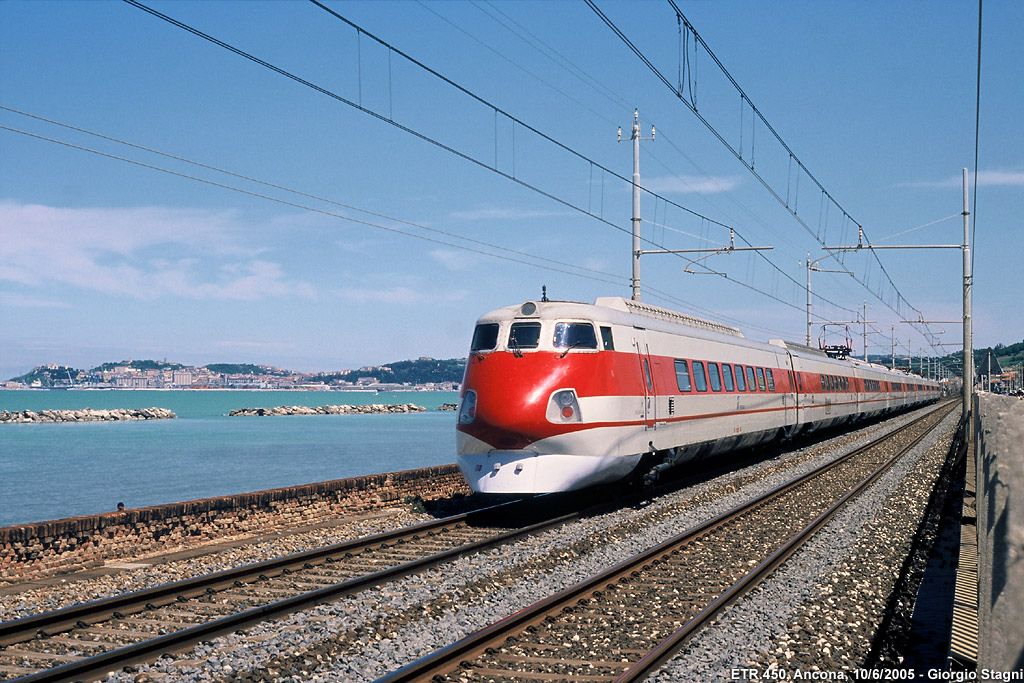
For much of the section between the stations of Pesaro and Ancona, the railway runs next to the shoreline. Using the coastal strip, belonging to the state, was cheaper than expropriating properties, as had been done between Bologna and Rimini. Here, an ETR 450 is photographed between Palombina and Ancona Torrette in June 2005.

The line continues through the railway stations of Pesaro and Fano, where it interchanged with the Fano–Urbino railway that closed in 1987. It then passes through the railway stations of Marotta-Mondolfo (relocated southwards in 1884), Senigallia, Marzocca (opened in 1916; a station to its south, Marzocchetta, closed in 1948), and Montemarciano. After crossing the Esino river, it meets the Rome–Ancona railway, and continues through the stations of Falconara Marittima, Palombina, and Ancona Torrette (opened 2002), finally reaching Ancona. The Adriatic railway continues southwards towards Lecce.

== Traffic ==
There are both regional passenger trains and long-distance trains on the line. These trains are operated by Trenitalia and Trenitalia Tper; the latter also operates the Freccia Orobica (Bergamo–Pesaro).

Its main train services are:

- Regional Trains Piacenza-Parma-Reggio Emilia-Modena-Bologna Centrale-Imola-Castel Bolognese-Faenza-Forlì-Cesena-Rimini-Riccione-Cattolica-Pesaro-Fano-Falconara Marittima-Ancona (sometimes, these train services start from Milan Centrale and continue to Pescara during the summer month. There is also a daily service from Ravenna and Rimini to Genoa Brignole)
- Regional Trains Bologna Centrale-Imola-Castel Bolognese-Lugo-Russi-Ravenna-Cervia-Cesenatico-Rimini
- Freccia Orobica regional trains Bergamo-Brescia-Cremona-Mantova-Suzzara-Ferrara-Ravenna-Cervia-Cesenatico-Rimini-Riccione-Cattolica-Pesaro (summer only)
- Intercity and Intercity Night Trains Turin Porta Nuova-Milan Centrale-Lodi-Piacenza-Parma-Reggio Emilia-Modena-Bologna-Faenza-Forli-Cesena-Rimini-Riccione-Pesaro-Fano-Senigallia-Ancona-Civitanova Marche-San Benedetto del Tronto-Pescara-Termoli-Foggia-Bari-Taranto/Brindisi-Lecce (these trains call in the summer season also in Cattolica-San Giovanni-Gabicce and, in the occasion of MotoGP and Superbike races, at Misano Adriatico)
- Frecciabianca High-Speed Trains

Turin Porta Nuova-Milan Centrale-Lodi-Piacenza-Parma-Reggio Emilia-Modena-Venice Santa Lucia-Venice Mestre-Padova-Rovigo-Ferrara-Bologna-Faenza-Forli-Cesena-Rimini-Riccione-Pesaro-Fano-Senigallia-Ancona-Civitanova Marche-San Benedetto del Tronto-Pescara-Termoli-Foggia-Bari-Taranto/Brindisi-Lecce (Most Frecciabianca services have now been replaced by Frecciargento high-speed trains)

- Frecciarossa High-Speed Trains Milan Centrale-Reggio Emilia-Bologna Centrale-Forlì-Rimini-Pesaro-Ancona-Pescara-Termoli-Foggia-Bari-Brindisi-Lecce
- EuroCity Trains Munich HBF-Rosenheim-Kufstein-Innsbruck-Brenner/Brennero-Brixen/Bressanone-Bozen/Bolzano-Trento-Rovereto-Verona Porta Nuova-Bologna Centrale-Cesena-Rimini (summer only, in the winter season, these trains terminate in Bologna)

== See also ==
- List of railway lines in Italy
- Metromare, a trolleybus rapid transit line that runs adjacent to the railway between Rimini and Riccione
