= Rimini railway station =

Railway station in Rimini, Italy

Rimini
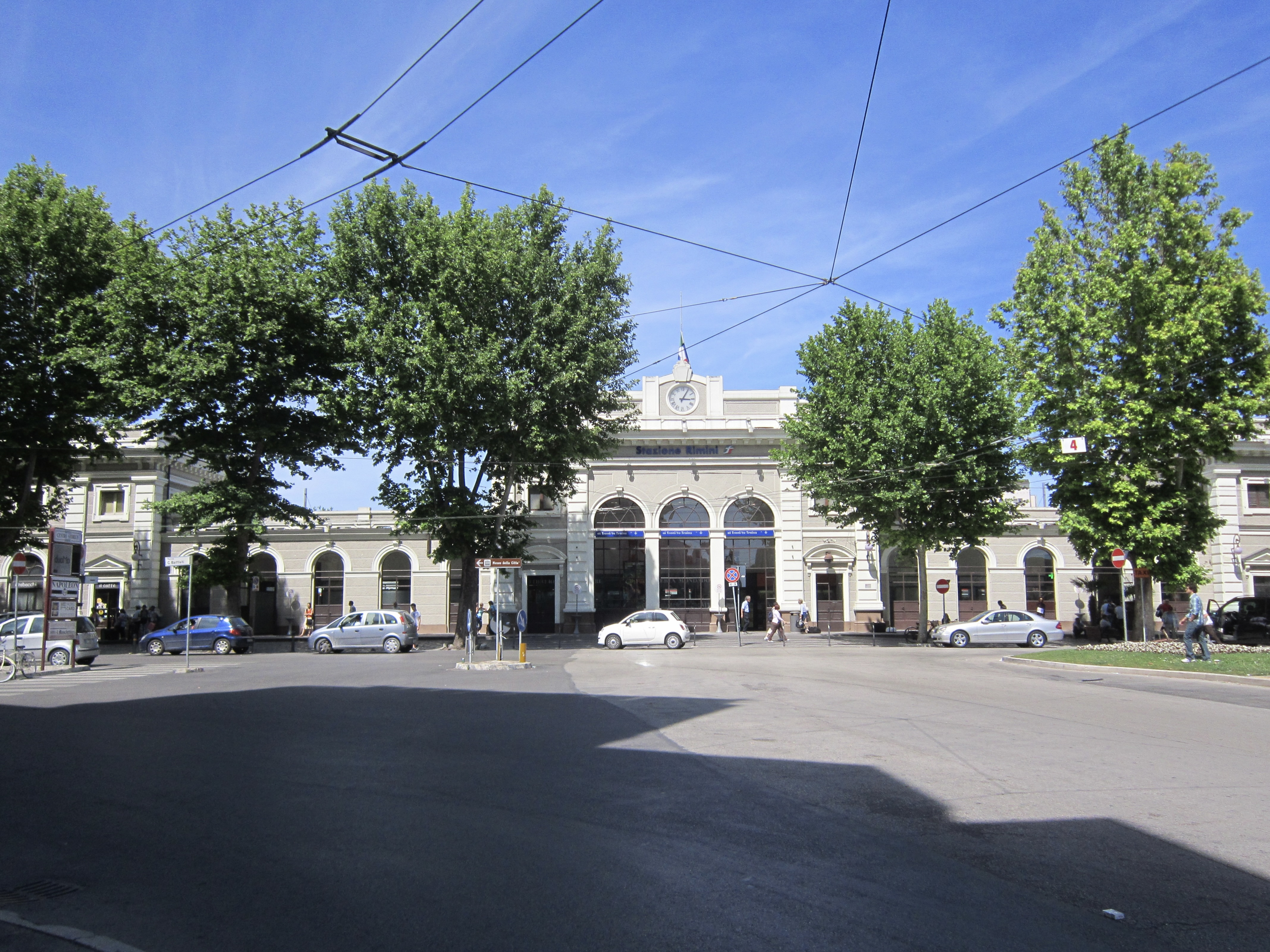
- The passenger building

General information
- Location: Piazzale Cesare Battisti; Rimini, Emilia-Romagna; Italy
- Coordinates: 44°03′50″N 12°34′26.4″E
- Operator: Rete Ferroviaria Italiana; Centostazioni
- Lines: Bologna–Ancona; Ferrara–Ravenna–Rimini
- Distance: 111.042 km (68.998 mi) from Bologna Centrale
- Platforms: 10
- Train operators: Trenitalia
- Connections: Buses Rimini trolleybuses

Other information
- Classification: Gold

History
- Opened: 4 October 1861; 165 years ago
- Rebuilt: 1914, late 1940s
Location
- Location within Emilia-Romagna Location within Northern Italy Location within Italy

Rimini railway station (Italian: Stazione di Rimini) is the main station serving the city and comune of Rimini, in the region of Emilia-Romagna, northern Italy. Opened in 1861, it forms part of the Bologna–Ancona railway, and is also a terminus of the Ferrara–Rimini railway.

The station is currently managed by Rete Ferroviaria Italiana (RFI). However, the commercial area of the passenger building is managed by Centostazioni. Train services are operated by Trenitalia. Each of these companies is a subsidiary of Ferrovie dello Stato (FS), Italy's state-owned rail company.

== History ==
The station was constructed by the Società Generale delle Strade Ferrate Romane in 1860–61. On 4 October 1861, it was inaugurated in the presence of the then-Prince Umberto of Savoy, together with the rest of the Forlì–Rimini section of the Bologna–Ancona railway. On 17 November 1861, Rimini was transformed from a temporary terminal station into a through station, when the final section of that railway, from Rimini to Ancona, came into operation.

The original station building was rather simple. It was located not far from the seaside, on the edge of the city, and was flanked by a locomotive depot and repair workshop.

On 1 July 1865, the Bologna–Ancona railway, including the station, came under the control of the Società per le Strade Ferrate Meridionali. On 10 January 1889, the station became a junction for the newly completed branch line to Ravenna and Ferrara. This development, coupled with growth in passenger traffic, created the need for an expansion of the station and its facilities, and the construction of other outbuildings.

Soon enough, a further increase in traffic made it essential to move the passenger building to the south of the locomotive depot and workshop, where there was enough space for a new station yard with wider platforms. The new station building, designed by Ulisse Dini, was opened on 1 November 1914.

Between 1915 and 1917, following the entry of Italy into World War I, the station was bombarded by the Austro-Hungarian Navy. In late 1938, in conjunction with electrification of the Bologna–Ancona railway, important works were carried out to upgrade the station's facilities.

During World War II, the station and its surrounds were repeatedly hit by Allied aerial bombardment. On the morning of 28 December 1943, 105 B-17 and 21 B-24 bomber planes, supported by P-38 fighter planes, had been ordered to hit the station; the raid partially destroyed the Victor Emmanuel II Theatre.

In the wake of World War II, damaged buildings were repaired. In 1963, new train control equipment was installed. In 1978, the station yard was further expanded to 10 tracks equipped with platforms. Since the start of the 21st century, some tracks and the locomotive shed have been closed, and the goods yard converted into a car park.

== Features ==
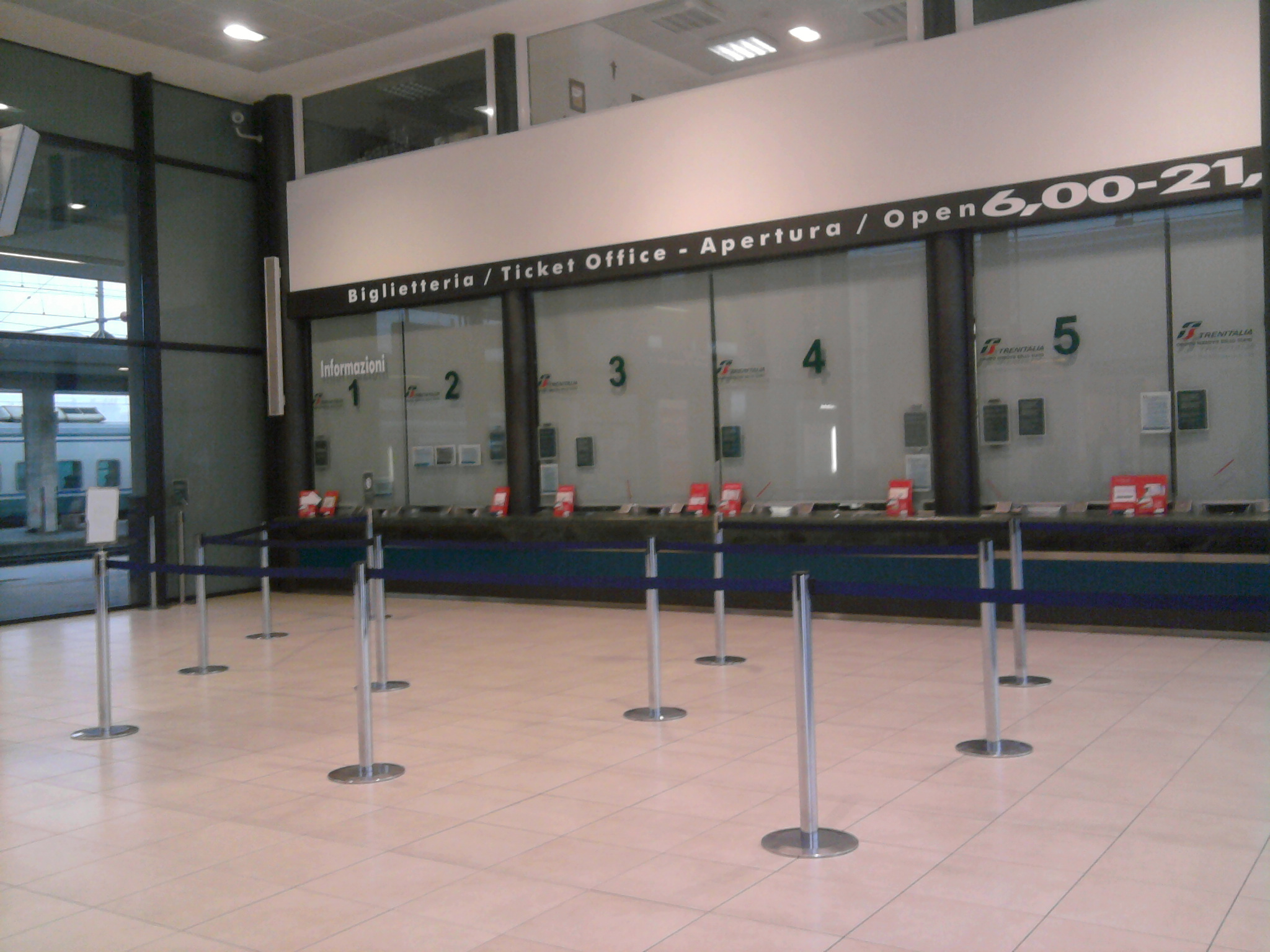
The renovated booking hall

The first station building was built in the classical style of the time. Its central section was on two levels, and it had two lateral wings, with adjacent service buildings. At that time, there were more than four platforms.

The current passenger building, completed in 1914, was built with pretensions to elegance and functionality, and is now located amongst the historic buildings in the city. At the time of its completion, the number of tracks used for passenger services grew to seven. In the 1970s, three more platform tracks were added.

Centostazioni has been renovating the passenger building with a simultaneous internal reorganization and change of use to the character of a shopping centre. In August 2021, two billboards were installed at the station, featuring illustrations of Emiliano Ponzi and quotes from Marco Missiroli. The larger (37 metres (121 ft) by 5 metres (16 ft)) billboard contains the phrase: "Yesterday, I dreamed of you and we were in Rimini. I'm already here and waiting for you". The smaller billboard (16 metres (52 ft) by 5 metres (16 ft)) shows two boys kissing.

== Services ==
=== Current ===
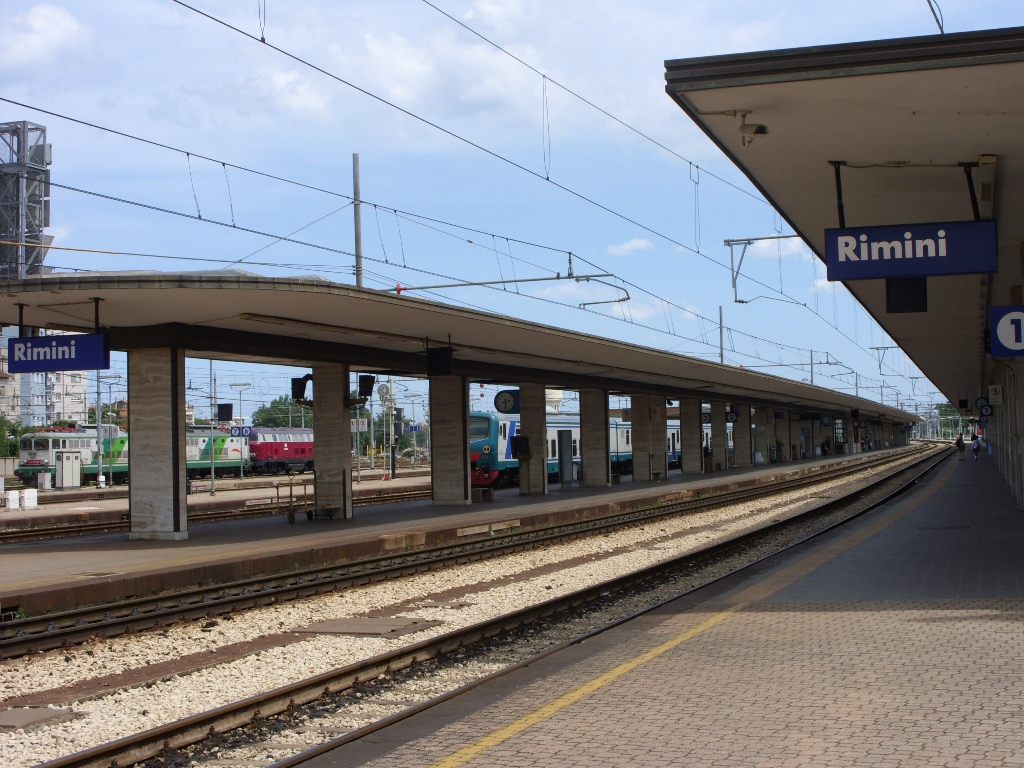
View of the platforms

As of February 2024, the station is served by regional, fast regional (regionale veloce), InterCity, and high-speed Frecciarossa trains. As is typical on the Italian network, trains scheduled at different times of the day call at different combinations or numbers of stations along similar routes, and often terminate at different stations. Regional trains calling at Rimini typically run to Pesaro, Ancona, Imola, Bologna Centrale or Ravenna, while fast regional trains typically run to Ancona, Bologna Centrale or Piacenza. The InterCity and Frecciarossa trains extend to Lecce and Milano Centrale, or terminate at major stops before those stations, such as Pescara Centrale or Bari Centrale.

There are infrequent or seasonal direct trains to San Pietro in Casale, Ferrara, Suzzarra, Torino Porta Nuova, Venezia Santa Lucia, and Trieste Centrale. There is a daily EuroCity service to München Hauptbahnhof, and a seasonal EuroNight service to München. One high-speed Frecciabianca runs to Roma Termini every morning, returning as a non-stop service to Ravenna in the evening; in November 2023, Trenitalia announced that the route would be upgraded to Frecciargento.

In 2019, the station had an average weekday passenger entry and exit total of 12,085 in July and 9,669 in November for regional and fast regional trains only.

=== Former ===
Between 1932 and 1943, Rimini railway station was the terminus of the Rimini–San Marino railway. The electrified railway line was inaugurated on 12 June 1932, with services beginning the following day. Services for San Marino departed from platform 1, at the eastern end of the station. There were between four and ten services per day, which were popular among tourists. Following the bombing of the line's maintenance depot on 26 and 27 November 1943, services were shortened to a flagman's booth by the Via Flaminia, which was reclassified as a stop, thereby avoiding the city centre. The railway line was abandoned after the Second World War, but both the Sammarinese and Italian governments have expressed interest in reopening the line.

On 21 June 1916, the Rimini–Mercatino Marecchia railway was inaugurated between Rimini Centrale and Verucchio; Rimini Centrale was located less than 150 metres (490 feet) from Rimini railway station. The line was extended to Torello in 1921, and to Mercatino Marecchia in 1922. On 15 October 1960, the railway was closed and replaced with a bus service, having run for some years with irrecuperable deficits. Much of the railway was incorporated into the SP258 provincial road. The route 160 bus line, operated by Start Romagna SpA, replaces the railway today. The station building is still extant, and was transformed into a bus station immediately after the line's closure.

== Interchange ==
The station is served by many local and interurban bus routes, operated by Start Romagna SpA, which connect the city centre to Rimini's suburbs, Rimini Fellini Airport, neighbouring coastal settlements, and towns and villages in Rimini's hinterland. The station is also served by the route 11 trolleybus, which runs between Rimini and Riccione along the principal seafront avenue. The trolleybus line was inaugurated on 1 July 1939, replacing an earlier tramway first inaugurated in 1877 between Rimini and its coast, which itself replaced a horse-drawn omnibus service from 1844.

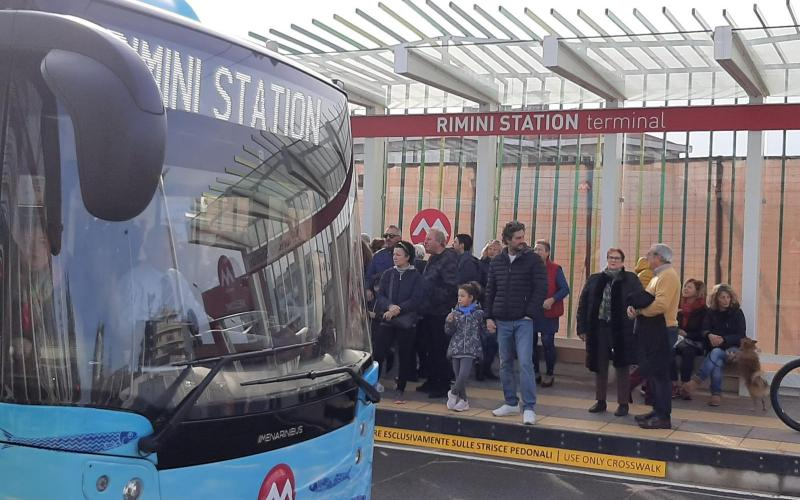
A bus at Rimini Station during Metromare's opening days in November 2019

Since 23 November 2019, Rimini railway station has been the terminus of Metromare, a trolleybus rapid transit line that runs between the railway stations of Rimini and Riccione on a segregated track beside the Bologna–Ancona railway. A 4.2-kilometre (2.6-mile) northern extension to Rimini Fiera has been approved, with construction starting in summer 2024.

== In popular culture ==
Intercity (2000), a Romagnol poem by Raffaello Baldini, begins with the narrator in Rimini railway station catching an empty train to Bologna:

In Rimini, nobody has noticed anything
or understood the disorganisation:
damn it, but how could this happen? ...
A train just for me?

— Raffaello Baldini, Intercity (2000)

== See also ==
- History of rail transport in Italy
- List of railway stations in Emilia-Romagna
- Rail transport in Italy
- Railway stations in Italy

Media related to Rimini railway station at Wikimedia Commons
