= Faenza–Lavezzola railway =

Railway line in Italy

Overview
- Status: in use
- Owner: RFI
- Locale: Emilia-Romagna, Italy
- Termini: Faenza; Lavezzola

Service
- Type: Heavy rail
- Operator(s): Trenitalia

History
- Opened: 1921

Technical
- Line length: 39 km (24 mi)
- Track gauge: 1,435 mm (4 ft 8 1/2 in) standard gauge
- Electrification: no

The Faenza–Lavezzola railway is a railway line in Emilia-Romagna, Italy.

The first section of the line, between Lavezzola and Lugo, was opened in 1888–89. It was completed in 1921 with the section from Lugo to Faenza.

== See also ==
- List of railway lines in Italy
