= Piacenza railway station =

Railway station in Italy

Piacenza
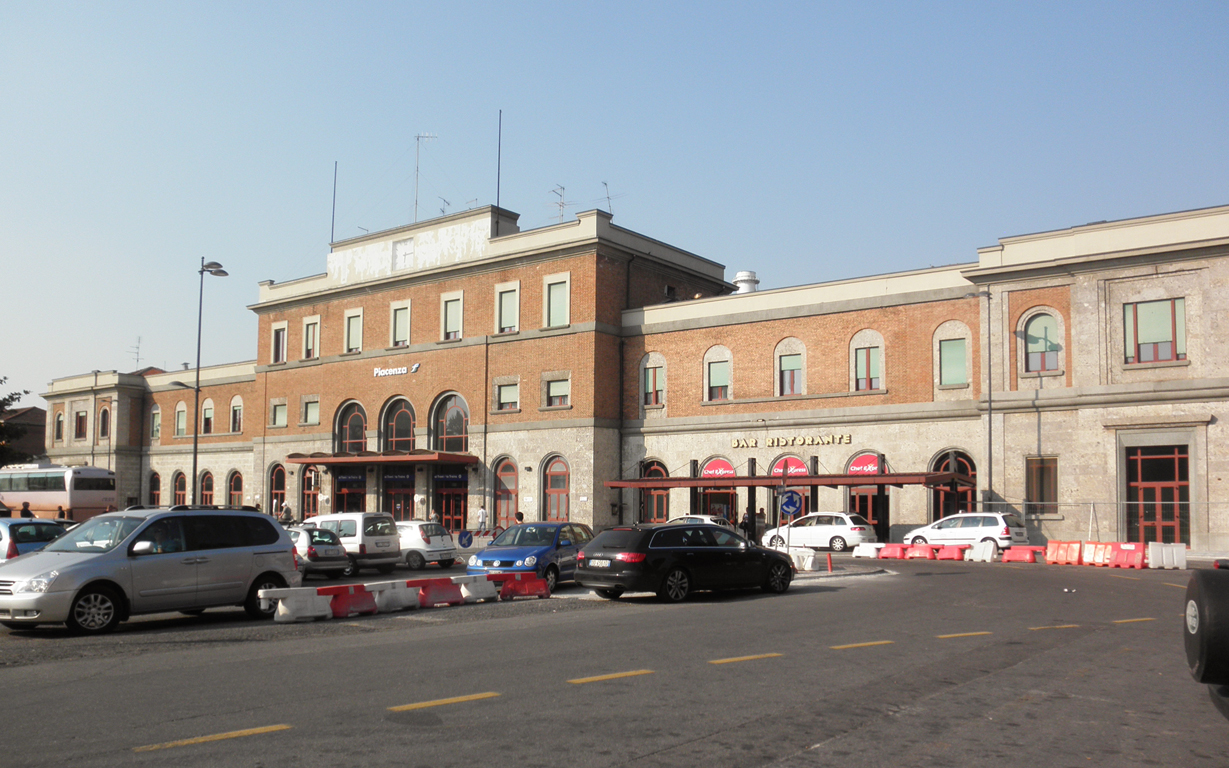
- The passenger building.

General information
- Location: Piazzale Guglielmo Marconi; 29121 Piacenza PC; Piacenza, Piacenza, Emilia-Romagna; Italy
- Coordinates: 45°03′07″N 09°42′22″E
- Operator: Rete Ferroviaria Italiana; Centostazioni
- Lines: Milano–Bologna; Alessandria–Piacenza; Piacenza–Cremona
- Distance: 146.823 km (91.232 mi) from Bologna Centrale; 96.513 km (59.970 mi) from Alessandria
- Train operators: Trenitalia, Trenord
- Connections: Urban and suburban buses

Construction
- Architect: Roberto Narducci

Other information
- Classification: Gold

History
- Opened: 21 July 1859; 167 years ago
- Rebuilt: 1937
- Electrified: 1938

Services
Preceding station	Trenitalia	Following station
Milano Centrale Terminus	InterCity Notte; Milan–Syracuse	Fidenza towards Siracusa
Location
- Location within Emilia-Romagna Location within Northern Italy Location within Italy

Piacenza railway station (Italian: Stazione di Piacenza) serves the city and comune of Piacenza, in the region of Emilia-Romagna, northern Italy. Opened in 1859, it forms part of the Milan–Bologna railway, and is also a terminus of two other railways, the principal line to Alessandria and the secondary line to Cremona.

The station is currently managed by Rete Ferroviaria Italiana (RFI). However, the commercial area of the passenger building is managed by Centostazioni. Train services are operated by Trenitalia. Each of these companies is a subsidiary of Ferrovie dello Stato (FS), Italy's state-owned rail company.

== Location ==
Piacenza railway station is situated at Piazzale Guglielmo Marconi, at the eastern edge of the city centre.

== History ==
The station entered service on 21 July 1859, together with the rest of the Bologna–Piacenza section of the Milan–Bologna railway. On 19 January 1860, it became the terminus of another line, the Alessandria–Piacenza railway, upon the completion of the final section of that line, between Trebbia bridge and Piacenza.

The station remained solely a terminal station only until 14 November 1861, when the rest of the line between Bologna and Milan came into operation.

In 1932, the station became a terminus of another secondary line, the newly opened Piacenza–Bettola railway. The following year, 1933, yet another secondary line, the Piacenza–Cremona railway, commenced operations with Piacenza as one of its termini.

The line to Bettola was closed in 1967. However, the line to Cremona has remained open, apart from a short period in the late 1940s, following the destruction of World War II.

=== 1997 train derailment ===
On 12 January 1997, an ETR 460 Pendolino train derailed about 200 metres (660 feet) outside the station, due to the rupture of the universal joint that connects the traction motors to the wheels. The accident caused eight fatalities, and much damage to the line. On board the train was the former President of Italy, Francesco Cossiga, who, by chance, remained unharmed. Although his assigned seat was in the carriage at the front of the train (in which the deceased victims were travelling), the President was travelling, at the time of the accident, in the dining car. Today, a plaque at the station commemorates the victims of the accident.

=== 2006 renovation ===
In May 2006, work was completed on renovations to the station. The renovation project, financed by RFI and Centostazioni, cost about €200,000. The work was mainly concerned with the passenger building: the construction of a suspended ceiling, the installation of a new lighting system, a broadening of opportunities for commercial services and adaption of technological systems to comply with legal requirements.

== Features ==
The passenger building was built in 1937, as a project of the architect Roberto Narducci, who later built many stations during the post-war era. The structure consists of three sections, all of them rectangular in shape.

The main, central, section is on three levels, of which only the ground floor is accessible to travelers. At the front of this section are three large arches that reach the upper levels. These arches are flanked on each side by two smaller arches.

Further away from each side of the central section is a two level wing section, with two entrances on each side. These sections are symmetrical, and each is connected with the central structure by another two level section, with five arches.

The station yard has eight tracks dedicated to passenger service. All the tracks have a platform sheltered by a canopy and connected with the other platforms by a pedestrian underpass.

Piacenza has a goods yard consisting of 13 tracks, numbered 9 to 22. The goods yard is equipped with a goods shed that is still active. Some abandoned tracks in the goods yard will be dismantled to make way for the mini-Piacenza highway under construction north of the town. The highway will connect the southern part of the city, via Diete di Roncaglia, with central Milan, and from there with the bridge over the Po river.

== Train services ==
The station is served by the following service(s):

- High speed services (Frecciarossa) Milan - Parma - Bologna - Florence - Rome
- High speed services (Frecciabianca) Milan - Parma - Bologna - Ancona - Pescara - Foggia - Bari - Brindisi - Lecce
- High speed services (Frecciabianca) Milan - Parma - Bologna - Ancona - Pescara - Foggia - Bari - Taranto
- High speed services (Frecciabianca) Turin - Parma - Bologna - Ancona - Pescara - Foggia - Bari - Brindisi - Lecce

== Passenger and train movements ==
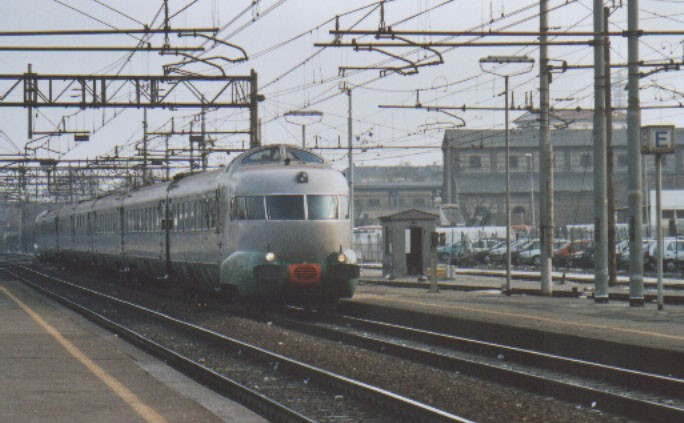
An ETR 302 passing through the station, March 2003.

=== Passenger services ===
The station has about 5 million passenger movements each year.

The passenger trains calling at the station are regional, express, InterCity, InterCity Night, Frecciabianca services, and a daily pair of Frecciarossa high speed trains.

A total of about 260 passenger trains serve the station each day. Their main destinations are Bologna Centrale, Turin and Rimini.

=== Goods traffic ===
In addition to Trenitalia, the operators of goods services to and from the station are Linea, Crossrail and GTS, which send frequent trains of container wagons to the nearby logistics hub.

== Interchange ==
The station provides interchange with urban and suburban buses.

== See also ==
- History of rail transport in Italy
- List of railway stations in Emilia-Romagna
- Rail transport in Italy
- Railway stations in Italy
