= Roberto Narducci =

Italian architect and engineer

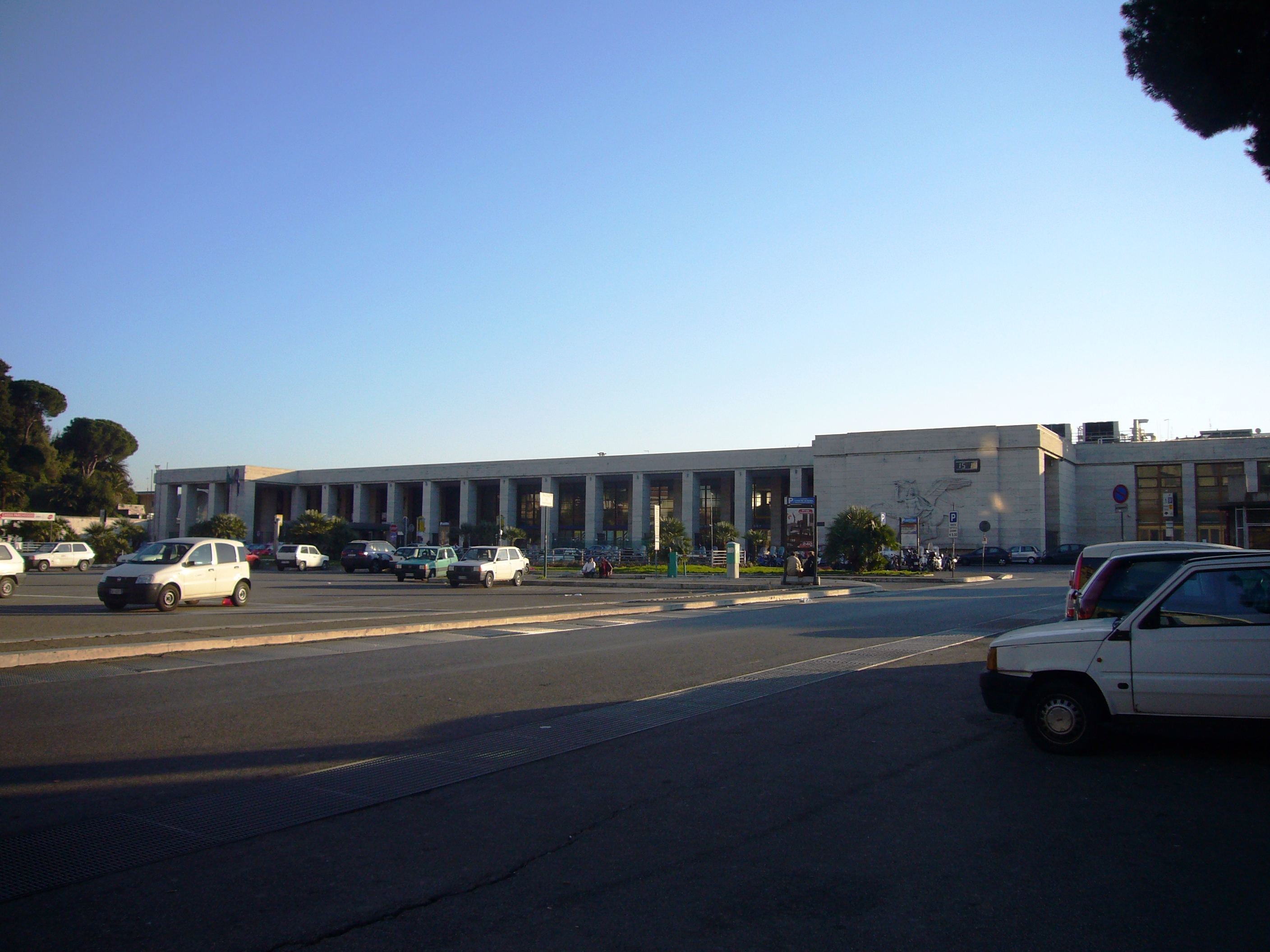
Roma Ostiense station

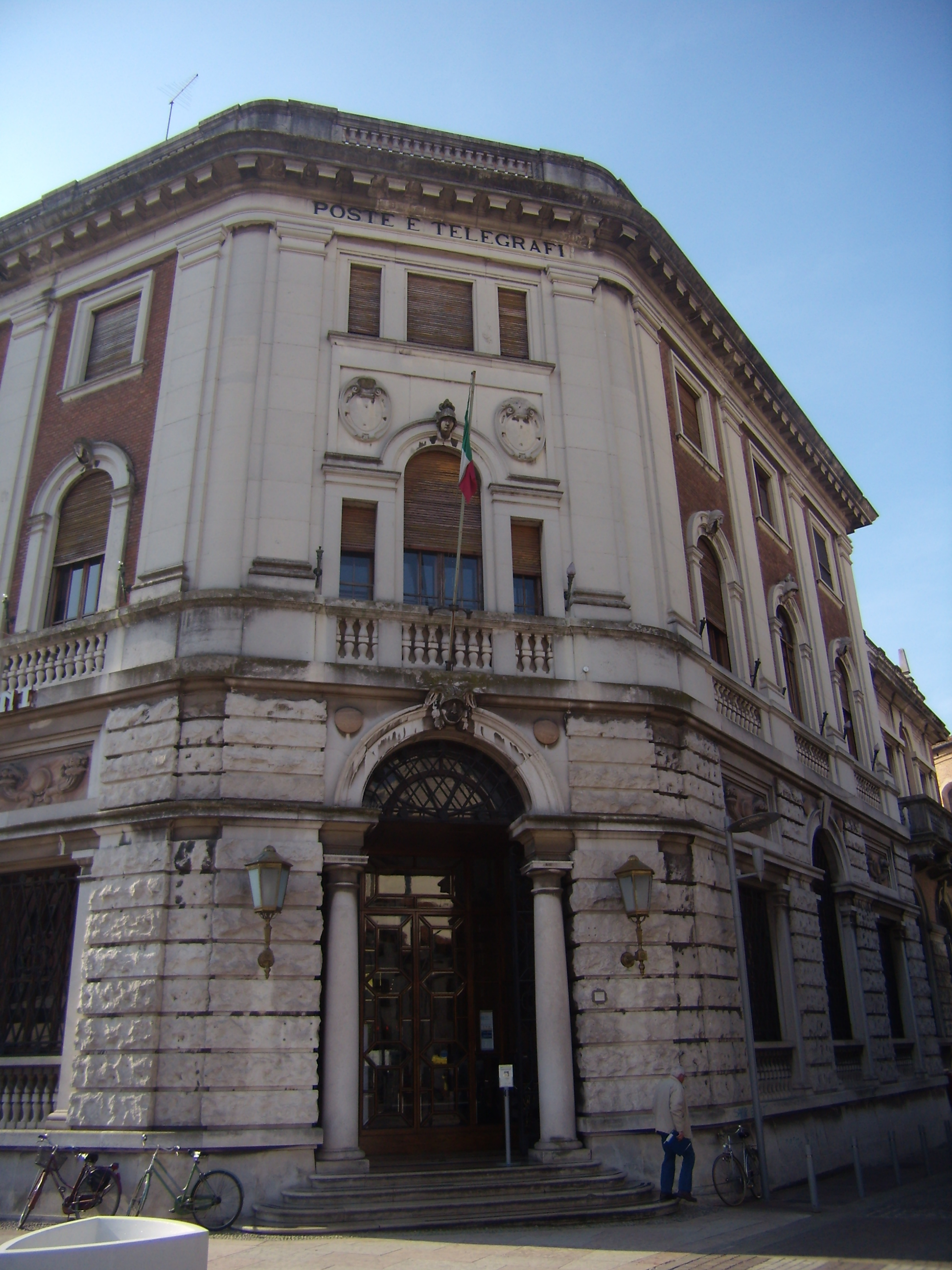
Palazzo delle Poste e Telegrafi di Rovigo

Roberto Narducci (14 August 1887 – 10 February 1979) was an Italian architect and engineer of the Modernist and Novocento movements.

== Life ==
Narducci was born in Rome, into a middle-class family. After receiving his technical 'licenzia' in 1903–04, he obtained a diploma in architectural decoration from the Arts and Industry Museum of Rome in 1909. In the same year he won a competition to become a designer for the Italian state railway company, Ferrovie dello Stato.

From 1920 to 1921 he enrolled in the three-year program at the Regia Scuola Superiori di Architettura, and from there he received his degree in Civil Architecture in 1923. In 1930 passed the qualification examination to become a practicing professional engineer.

In his lifetime, working under the Ministry of Communications (now within the Ministry of Transport) he designed approximately 40 railway stations, both new buildings and post-war reconstructions and about ten Post Offices. He frequently worked with his colleague Angiolo Mazzoni. He died in Rome, aged 91.

== Structures ==
Buildings

- Palazzo delle Poste e Telegrafi di Bari, 1931 plan
- Palazzo delle Poste e Telegrafi di Rovigo, 1927-1930

Railway stations

- Albenga railway station, 1930
- Battipaglia railway station, 1930
- Levanto railway station
- Loano railway station plan
- Santa Flavia railway station, 1932
- Redipuglia railway station, 1936
- Roma Ostiense railway station, 1940
- Ventimiglia railway station
- Verona Porta Nuova railway station
- Viareggio railway station

== Bibliography ==
- M. Giacomelli, Roberto Narducci (1887-1979) architetto-ingegnere del Ministero delle Comunicazioni. E. Godoli e A. I. Lima, a cura di. Architettura ferroviaria in Italia Novecento. Dario Flaccovio Editore, 2004, ISBN 88-7758-597-8
- A. Morgera, Roberto Narducci e la monumentalizzazione delle stazioni ferroviarie. I casi di Venezia Santa Lucia, Redipuglia e Roma Ostiense. 1934-1938, tesi di laurea, Trieste 2006, relatore P. Nicoloso, correlatore B. Boccazzi Mazza.
- A. Morgera (ed.), La stazione di Redipuglia di Roberto Narducci, exhibition catalogue for "Sentieri di Pace" / Pro Loco di Fogliano Redipuglia, Fogliano Redipuglia 2007.
