= Ancona railway station =

Railway station in Ancona, Italy

Ancona
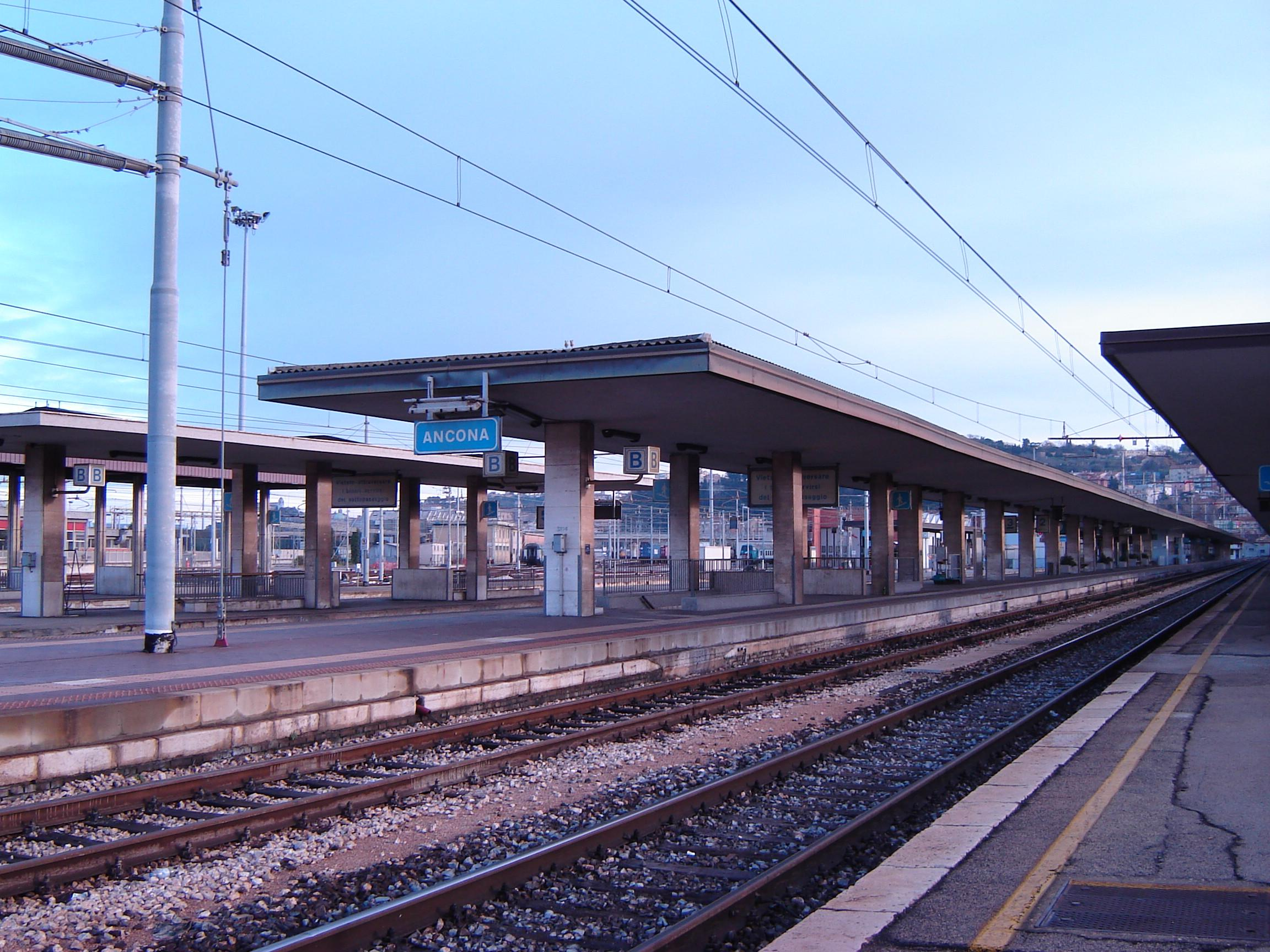
- View of the platforms of the station.

General information
- Location: Piazza Carlo e Nello Rosselli; 60100 Ancona AN; Ancona, Ancona, Marche; Italy
- Coordinates: 43°36′26.76″N 13°29′51.96″E
- Elevation: 3 m (9.8 ft)
- Operator: Rete Ferroviaria Italiana; Centostazioni
- Lines: Bologna–Ancona; Ancona–Lecce; Ancona–Orte
- Distance: 203.996 km (126.757 mi) from Bologna Centrale
- Platforms: 7 (13 tracks)
- Train operators: Trenitalia; Nuovo Trasporto Viaggiatori
- Connections: Urban and suburban buses, including trolleybuses

Other information
- Classification: Gold

History
- Opened: 1861; 165 years ago
Location
- Location within Marche Location within Italy

Ancona railway station, sometimes called Ancona Centrale, is the main railway station of Ancona, Region of Marché (the Marches). It is the most important station of the region and is owned by the Ferrovie dello Stato (FS), Italy's state-owned railway company.

== History ==
The station was opened on 17 November 1861 upon completion of the railway line from Bologna. The original structure, built in similar style to that of Bologna Centrale, had been heavily damaged during the Second World War and was rebuilt a few years after that.

== Facilities ==
Ancona's station building comprises two floors; the upper floor is used by Trenitalia as railway offices. The station is located at Piazza Rosselli, in front of the docks. It hosts two small cafes, a newsagent outlet and several retail stores. An Indian restaurant across the road of Ancona station remains open till late; it is a good place to wait for late evening and overnight trains, as shops or food places in the vicinity would be closed.

The station is a principal stop on the Adriatic Railway which runs along the east coast of Italy. There is a junction for a short line to the seaport at Ancona Marittima station.

== Train services ==
As a principal station, most long-distance trains – high-speed (Freccia, formerly branded Eurostar Italy) and Intercity (day and overnight) – call at Ancona. Additional high-speed trains operated by NTV-Italo run between Milan and Ancona during the summer months.

The following services call at this station:

High-speed

- High-speed train (Trenitalia Frecciarossa) Milan-Bari: Milan – Reggio Emilia – Bologna – Rimini – Ancona – Pescara –
- High-speed train (Trenitalia Frecciabianca) Milan-Taranto: Milan – Piacenza – Parma – Reggio Emilia – Modena – Bologna – Rimini – Pesaro – Ancona – Giulianova – Pescara – Termoli – Foggia – Bari – Taranto
- High-speed train (Trenitalia Frecciabianca) Milan-Lecce: Milan – Piacenza – Parma – Reggio Emilia – Modena – Bologna – Rimini – Pesaro – Senigalla – Ancona – Pescara – Termoli – Foggia – Bari – Brindisi – Lecce
- High-speed train (Trenitalia Frecciabianca) Turin-Lecce: Turin – Asti – Alessandria – Piacenza – Parma – Reggio Emilia – Modena – Bologna – Rimini – Riccione – Pesaro – Ancona – Pescara – Termoli – Foggia – Bari – Monopoli – Brindisi – Lecce
- High-speed train (Trenitalia Frecciabianca) Venice-Lecce: Venice – Padua – Rovigo – Ferrara – Bologna – Rimini – Riccione – Pesaro – Ancona – Pescara – Termoli – Foggia – Bari – Brindisi – Lecce

Intercity and Overnight

- Intercity train (Trenitalia Intercity) Ancona-Rome: Ancona – Falconara Marittima – Jesi – Fabriano – Foligno – Terni – Rome
- Intercity train (Trenitalia Intercity) Bologna-Lecce: Bologna – Faenza – Cesena – Rimini – Riccione – Pesaro – Senigalla – Ancona – Loreto – Giulianova – Pescara – Termoli – Foggia – Trani – Bisceglie – Bari – Monopoli – Brindisi – Lecce
- Intercity train (Trenitalia Intercity) Bologna-Bari: Bologna – Faenza – Cesena – Rimini – Riccione – Pesaro – Senigalla – Ancona – Loreto – Giulianova – Pescara – Termoli – Foggia – Trani – Bisceglie – Bari
- Intercity train (Trenitalia Intercity) Milan-Taranto: Milan – Lodi – Piacenza – Parma – Reggio Emilia – Modena – Bologna – Faenza – Cesena – Rimini – Riccione – Pesaro – Senigalla – Ancona – Giulianova – Pescara – Termoli – Foggia – Trani – Bisceglie – Bari – Taranto
- Night train (Trenitalia Intercity Notte) Milan-Lecce: Lecce – Brindisi – Monopoli – Bari – Bisceglie – Trani – Foggia – Pescara – Ancona – Rimini – Cesena – Bologna – Milan
- Night train (Trenitalia Intercity Notte) Milan-Lecce via Taranto: Lecce – Brindisi – Taranto – Bari – Bisceglie – Trani – Foggia – Pescara – Ancona – Rimini – Bologna – Milan

Regional

- Regional train (Trenitalia Regionale) Ancona-Piacenza: Ancona – Flaconara Marittima – Senigalla – Pesaro – Riccione – Rimini – Cesena – Faenza – Imola – Bologna – Modena – Reggio Emilia – Parma – Fidenza – Piacenza
- Regional train (Trenitalia Regionale) Ancona- Rome: Ancona – Falconara Marittima – Jesi – Fabriano – Foligno – Trevi – Terni – Orte – Rome
- Regional train (Trenitalia Regionale) Ancona-Rimini: Ancona – Falconara Marittima – Senigalla – Fano – Pesaro – Riccione – Rimini
- Regional train (Trenitalia Regionale) Ancona-Pescara: Ancona – Giulianova – Pescara
- Regional train (Trenitalia Regionale) Ancona-Pesaro: Ancona – Falconara Marittima – Senigalla – Fano – Pesaro
- Regional train (Trenitalia Regionale) Ancona-Ravenna: Ancona – Falconara Marittima – Senigalla – Fano – Pesaro – Riccione – Rimini – Bellaria – Classe – Ravenna
- Regional train (Trenitalia Regionale) Ancona-Fabriano/Foligno: Ancona – Falconara Marittima – Jesi – Albacina – Fabriano – Foligno
- Regional train (Trenitalia Regionale) Ancona-Ascoli Piceno: Ancona – Osimo Castelfidardo – Loreto – Pedaso – Grottammare – Porto d'Ascoli – Ascoli Piceno
- Regional train (Trenitalia Regionale) Ancona-Macerata: Ancona – Loreto – Montecosaro – Macerata

== Photo gallery ==
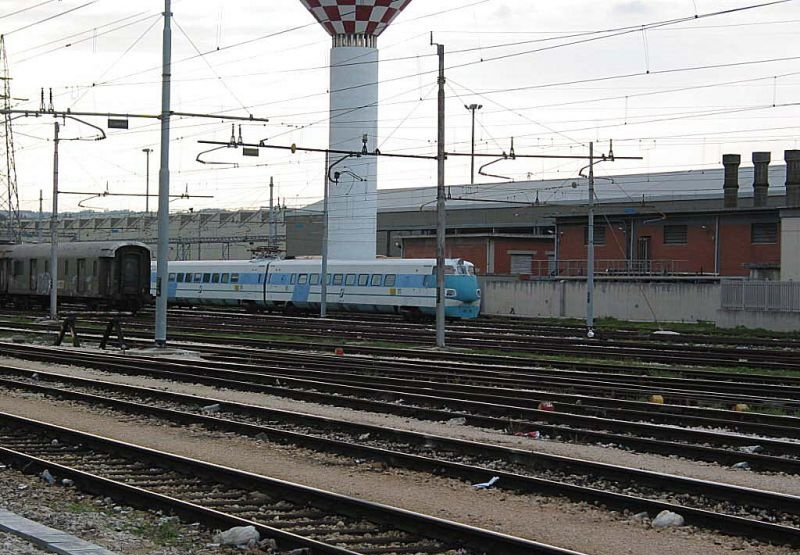
View of the station depot and its main building

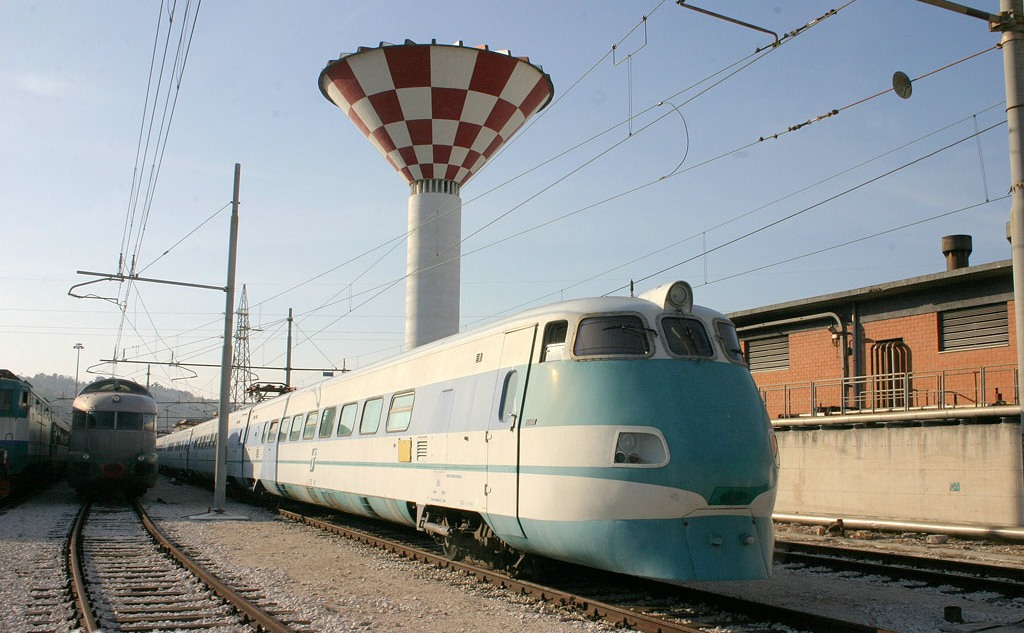
View of an ETR 401 parked at the station depot and of the station tower

== See also ==
- Ancona Marittima railway station
- List of railway stations in the Marche
- Railway stations in Italy
- Rail transport in Italy
- History of rail transport in Italy
