= Mirandola tramway =

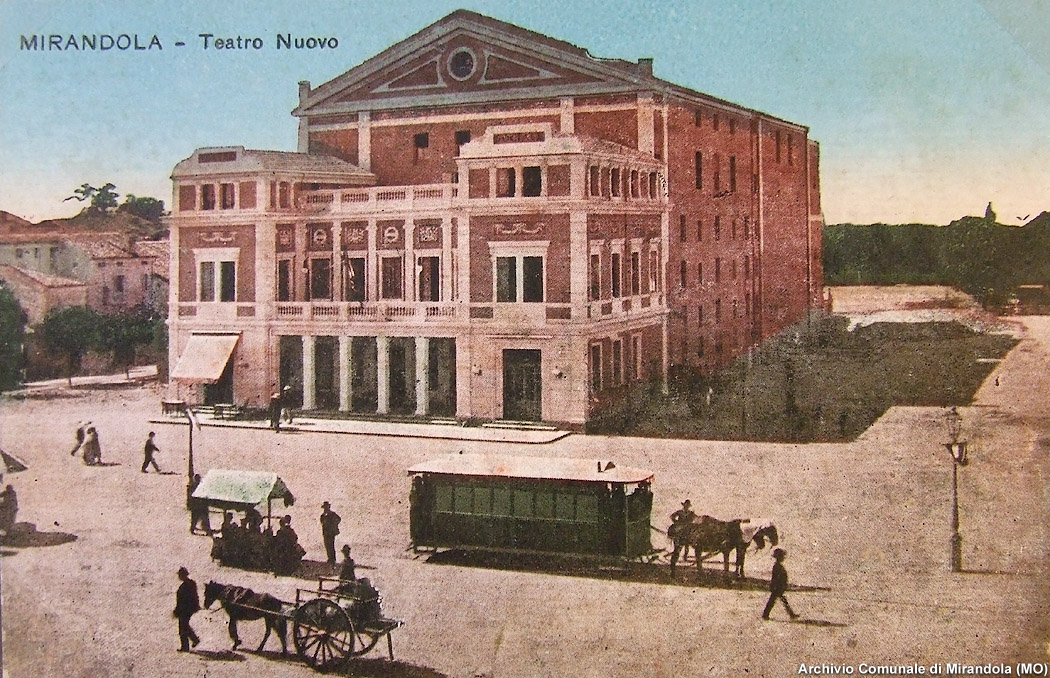
- Horsecar in front of Teatro Nuovo (Mirandola)

Overview
- Native name: Tranvia di Mirandola
- Owner: Municipality of Mirandola
- Termini: Teatro Nuovo, Mirandola; Mirandola railway station
- Stations: Cividale, Borghetto

Service
- Type: Tram

History
- Opened: 1 October 1904
- Closed: 1 September 1927

Technical
- Line length: 4 km (2.5 mi)
- Number of tracks: 1
- Track gauge: 1,435 mm (4 ft 8 1/2 in) standard gauge
- Highest elevation: 18 m (59 ft)

The Mirandola tramway was a horse-drawn tramway active from 1904 to 1927 and connected the historic centre of Mirandola (province of Modena) with the Mirandola railway station located in the hamlet of Cividale.

== History ==
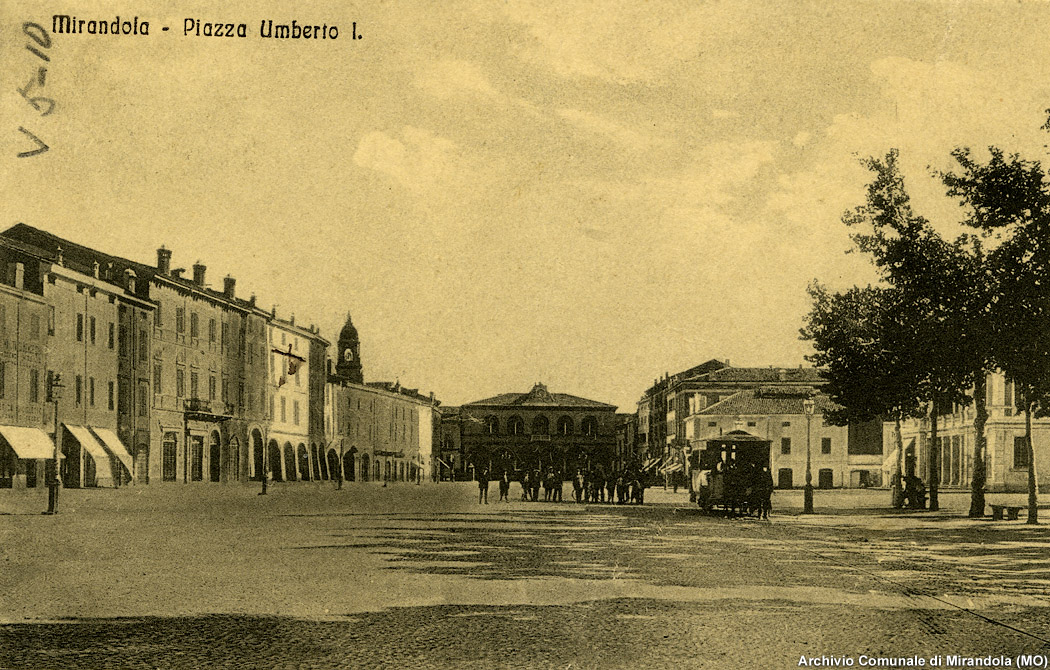
Horsecar in Umberto I square (now Costituente square)

In 1902 the new Mirandola railway station and the section from San Felice sul Panaro to Poggio Rusco of the Verona-Bologna railway under construction were inaugurated in the hamlet of Cividale

Initially, the connection was provided by stagecoaches and public carriages, but after a couple of years it was decided to build a horse-drawn tramway.

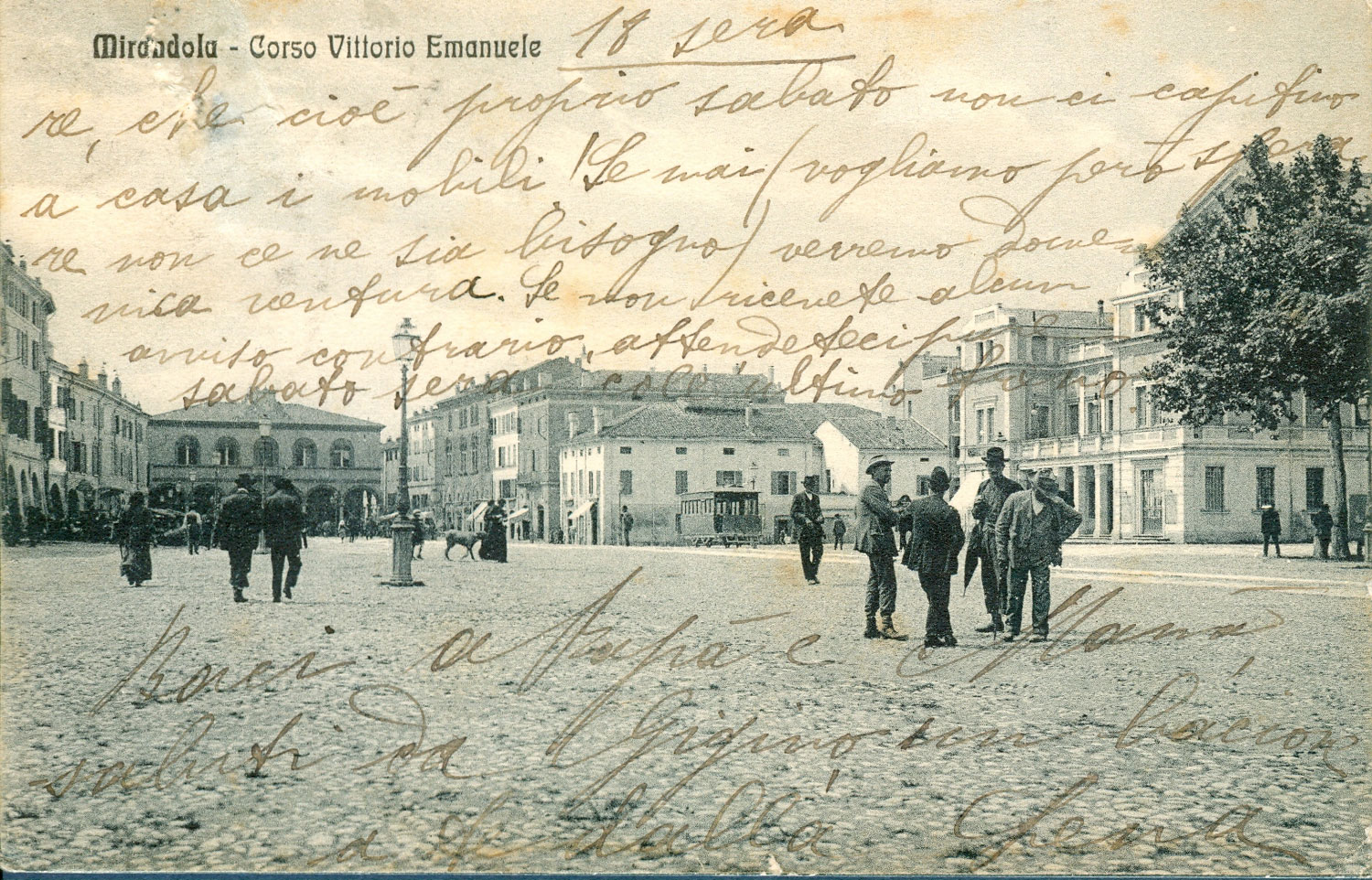
Horsecar stopping

On 29 March 1904, the city council authorised the expenditure of 48,000 lire for the laying of the tracks, but in the end 65,000 lire were spent. The service was officially launched on 1 October 1904.

On 1 September 1927 the line was decommissioned due to rising costs (especially for horse hay), excessive track maintenance costs (uneconomical compared to the first coaches) and the Rolo-Mirandola railway project (never completed), which was supposed to connect the FS station in Cividale with the new SEFTA station located near the old town centre and activated in 1932.

== Route ==
The tramway was about four kilometres long and was built with normal gauge Marsillon, Demerbe and Vignoles tracks mounted on oak sleepers.

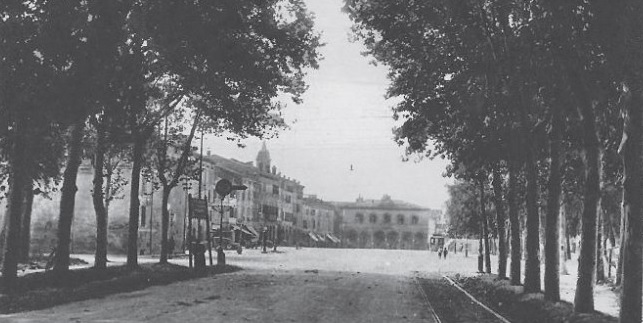
Track as seen from Cinque Martiri boulevard

The route started in Piazza Umberto I (now the southern part of Piazza della Costituente), in front of the Teatro Nuovo, while to the side of the theatre itself (in Via del Mercato, now Via Giovanni Tabacchi) was the roof of the covered car depot, accessed by a bend.

After crossing Corso Vittorio Emanuele II (now the northern part of Piazza della Costituente) and a short section of the Abetone national road 55 (now Viale Cinque Martiri, part of the Abetone and Brennero national road 12), the tram turned right near the Mulino della Rotonda towards the forum boario and then went straight down the long De Barbieri avenue (now Antonio Gramsci avenue) on the right-hand side.

After two kilometres, at the Cividale stop near the church of St. Michael Arcangel, there was a switch and a double track to allow cars coming from different directions to cross.

Before reaching the terminus of the FS railway station, the tram stopped at the Borghetto junction in Carobbio dell'Olmo, located at the third kilometre.

The entire route can now be cycled on the Antonio Gramsci avenue cycle path.

== Rolling stock ==
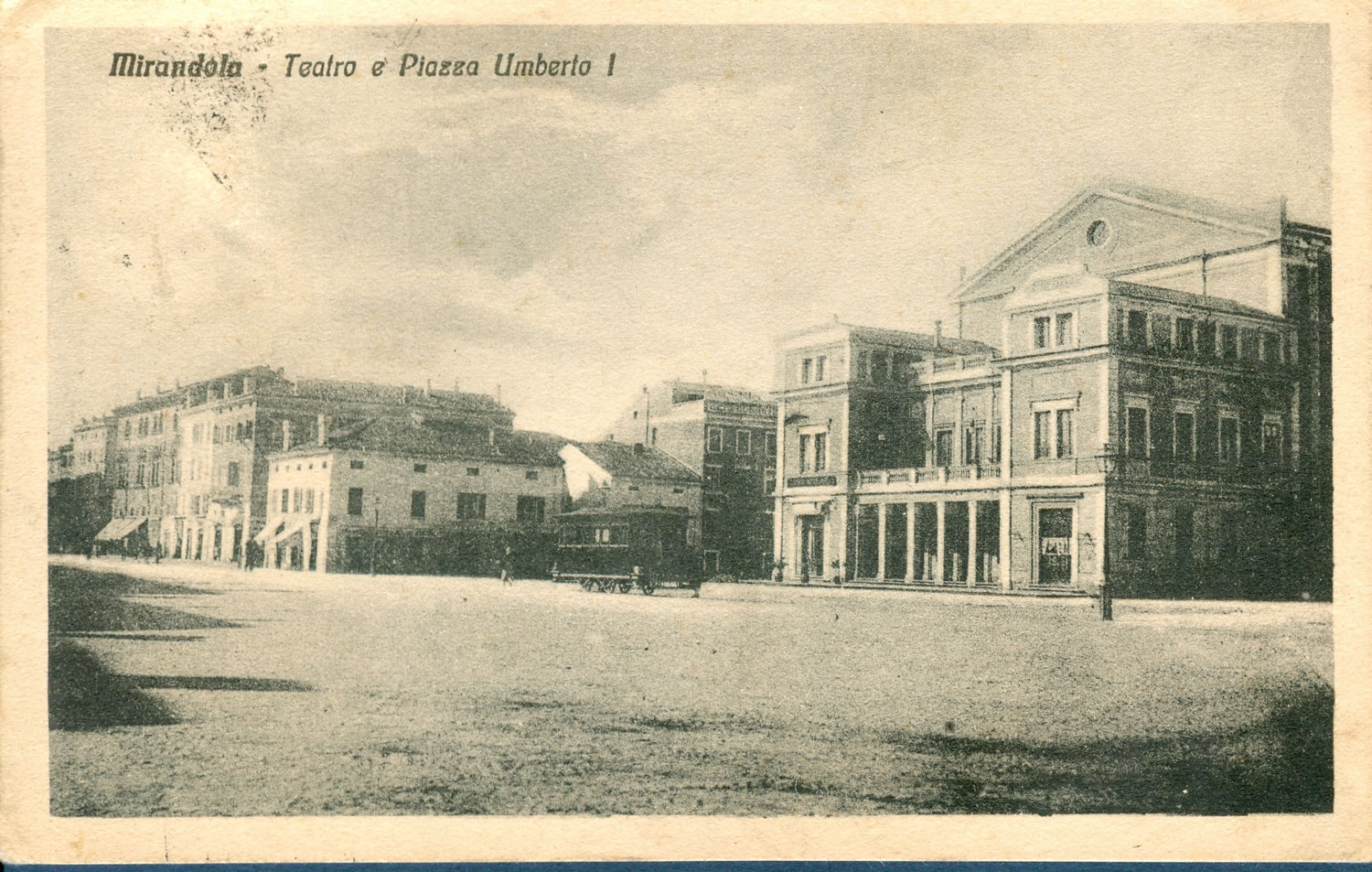
Car parked in front of the Teatro Nuovo

Initially, four cars (three passengers and one freight) were used that had been discontinued from the Bologna tram network (which was in the process of being electrified). The passenger cars, yellow in colour and pulled by a pair of horses, were numbered 1, 2 and 3: the first two were divided into 1st and 2nd class, while the third was a single class (II).

In 1917, one carriage broke down and the company took the opportunity to buy three more from the old tram network in Padua. These cars could carry 24 seated passengers plus 14 standing passengers.

== Bibliography ==
- Fabio Casini; Fabio Montella (2012). Quando la Bassa viaggiava in tram. Finale Emilia: CDL Edizioni. p. 84. ISBN 978-88-97120-37-7.

== See also ==
- Mirandola railway station
- List of town tramway systems in Italy
