= Trams in Bologna =

Trams in Bologna (1880–1963)
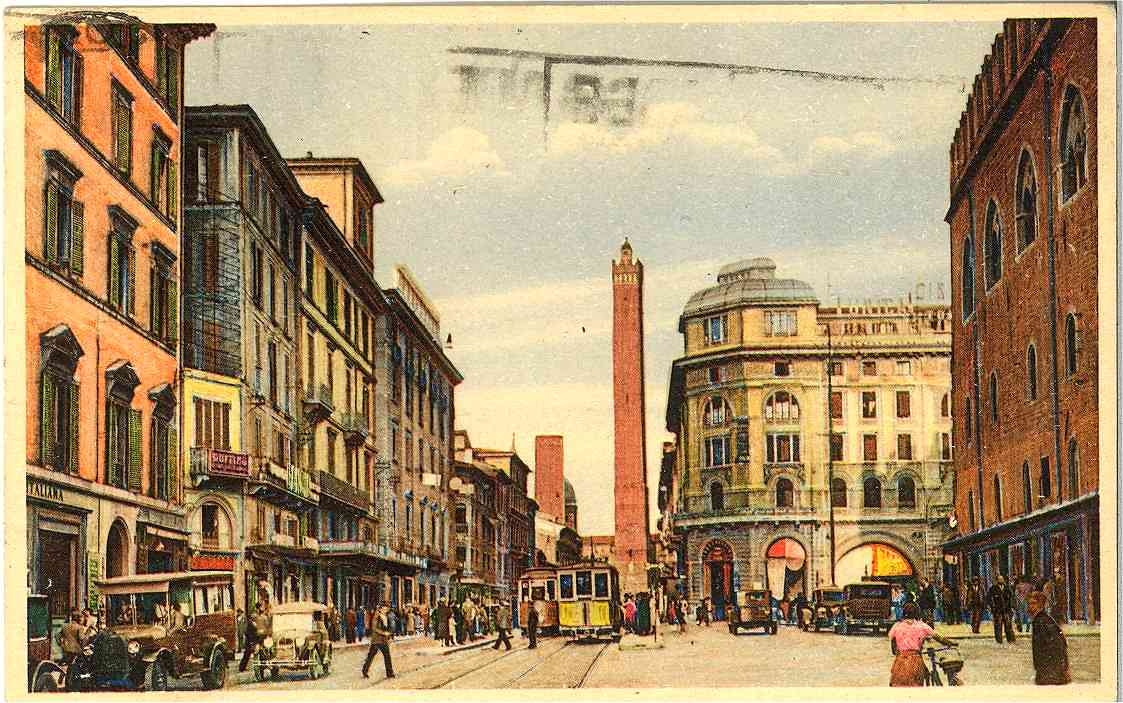

Overview
- Locale: Bologna, Italy
- Transit type: Tram
- Number of lines: 16 (maximum)

Operation
- Began operation: 2 October 1880
- Ended operation: 3 November 1963

Technical
- Track gauge: 1445 mm
- Electrification: 550 V DC (since 1904)
System map

The Bologna tramway network (Italian: Rete tranviaria di Bologna) was an important part of the public transport network of Bologna, Italy. It was established in 1880 and discontinued in 1963.

== History ==
The first plans for six horsecar lines were approved by the town council in 1877:

- Piazza Vittorio Emanuele-Bologna Centrale railway station
- Piazza Vittorio Emanuele-Porta San Felice
- Piazza Vittorio Emanuele-Barriera Santo Stefano
- Piazza Vittorio Emanuele-Porta Maggiore
- Piazza Vittorio Emanuele-Porta San Mamolo
- Piazza Vittorio Emanuele-Porta Saragozza.

Works on the first stretch, linking Bologna Centrale railway station to Piazza Maggiore, began in September 1880. Service began on Saturday, 2 October 1904.

The first two electrified lines began operating on 11 February 1904.

In 1953, it was decided that, starting from the following year, tramway lines would be gradually discontinued and transformed to bus and trolleybus lines. Service was officially discontinued on Sunday, 3 November 1963, when the last tramway service operated on the last remaining line to San Ruffillo.

== Routes ==
=== 1902 to 1910 Network ===
- Piazza Vittorio Emanuele-Via Indipendenza-Bologna Centrale railway Station
- Piazza Vittorio Emanuele-Piazza del Nettuno-Via Ugo Bassi-Via San Felice-Porta San Felice
- Piazza Vittorio Emanuele-Via dell'Archiginnasio-Piazza Galvani-Via Farini-Via Santo Stefano-Località Lo Sterlino
- Piazza Vittorio Emanuele-Via d'Azeglio-Palazzina
- Piazza Vittorio Emanuele-Porta Saragozza
- Piazza Vittorio Emanuele-Porta Zamboni-Sobborgo Sant'Egidio
- Piazza Vittorio Emanuele-Porta San Vitale
- Piazza Vittorio Emanuele-Porta Lame
- Porta San Felice-Scala
- Porta Galliera-Stabilimento Tramways della Zucca

=== 1910 to 1932 Network ===
- 1 Piazza Vittorio Emanuele-Bologna Centrale railway Station
- 2 Piazza Vittorio Emanuele-Via D'Azeglio
- 3 Piazza Vittorio Emanuele-Via Saffi-Scala
- 4 Piazza Vittorio Emanuele-Mazzini
- 5 Piazza Vittorio Emanuele-Saragozza
- 6 Piazza Vittorio Emanuele-Santo Stefano
- 7 Piazza Vittorio Emanuele-San Vitale
- 8 Piazza Vittorio Emanuele-Zamboni
- 9 Piazza Vittorio Emanuele-Lame
- 10 Piazza Vittorio Emanuele-Zucca
- 11 Piazza Vittorio Emanuele-Sant'Isaia
- 12 Piazza Vittorio Emanuele-Castiglione

=== 1932 Network ===
- 1 Piazza Vittorio Emanuele-Bologna Centrale railway Station
- 2 Piazza Vittorio Emanuele-Via D'Azeglio
- 3 Piazza Vittorio Emanuele-Via Saffi-Scala
- 4 Piazza Vittorio Emanuele-Mazzini
- 5 Piazza Vittorio Emanuele-Saragozza
- 6 Piazza Vittorio Emanuele-Santo Stefano-Sterlino-San Ruffillo
- 7 Piazza Vittorio Emanuele-San Vitale
- 8 Piazza Vittorio Emanuele-Zamboni
- 9 Piazza Vittorio Emanuele-Lame-
- 10 Piazza Vittorio Emanuele-Zucca-Casaralta
- 11 Piazza Vittorio Emanuele-Sant'Isaia-Littoriale
- 12 Piazza Vittorio Emanuele-Castiglione-San Michele in Bosco
- 15 Piazza Vittorio Emanuele-Corticella
- 16 Piazza Vittorio Emanuele-Mascarella

=== Network as of 1943 ===
- 1 Piazza Galvani-Piazza Vittorio Emanuele-Bologna Centrale railway Station
- 2 Bologna Centrale Railway Station-Piazza Vittorio Emanuele-Via d'Azeglio
- 3 Via Montegrappa-Via Saffi-Scala
- 4 Piazza Re Enzo-Via Mazzini
- 5 Via Venezian-Porta Saragozza
- 6 Piazza Vittorio Emanuele-Chiesanuova
- 7 Via Venezian-Porta San Vitale
- 9 Via Montegrappa-Porta Lame
- 10 Piazza Galvani-Piazza Vittorio Emanuele-Zucca-Casaralta
- 11 Piazza Cavour-Porta Sant'Isaia-Littoriale
- 13 Piazza Minghetti-Chiesanuova-San Ruffillo
- 14 Piazza Galvani-Piazza Vittorio Emanuele-Ippodromo/Mercato Ortofrutticolo
- 15 Piazza De Marchi-Corticella
- 17/20 Funivia di San Luca-Piazza Malpighi-Via Roma-Bologna Centrale railway Station
- 18 Piazza Malpighi-Littoriale-Casalecchio di Reno
- 19 Piazza Malpighi-Littoriale-Casalecchio di Reno - Connected with Casalecchio-Vignola Railway

=== Network as of 1952 ===
The post-Second World War period in Bologna caused the change of some road names and some routes merging with other ones. Piazza Vittorio Emanuele Became Piazza Maggiore. The tramway network served San Lazzaro di Savena for the first time.

- 1/5 Bologna Centrale railway Station-Via Indipendenza-Porta Saragozza
- 2/8 Via D'Azeglio-Via Zamboni
- 3 Via Montegrappa-Via Saffi-Scala-Borgo Panigale
- 4 Via Orefici-Via Mazzini
- 6 Piazza Maggiore-Chiesanuva
- 7 Via Orefici-Via San Vitale
- 9 Via Montegrappa-Porta Lame
- 10 Via Ugo Bassi-Zucca-Casaralta
- 11 Via Rizzoli-Stadio Renato Dall'Ara
- 12 Bologna Centrale railway Station-San Michele in Bosco
- 13 Piazza Maggiore-Chiesanuova-San Ruffillo
- 14 Via Ugo Bassi-Ippodromo/Mercato Ortofrutticolo
- 15 Via Ugo Bassi-Corticella
- 17 Via Rizzoli-Funivia di San Luca
- 18 Piazza Malpighi-Casalecchio di Reno
- 20 Via Orefici-San Lazzaro di Savena

=== 1960-1963 Network ===
- 4 Via Orefici-Via Mazzini
- 6 Piazza Minghetti-Chiesanuova
- 7 Via Orefici-San Vitale
- 13 Piazza Minghetti-San Ruffillo (as of 1963, this was the only operating route) - the last tram departure of route 13 was on the 3rd of November 1963, operated by tramcars no. 210 and 218.
- 20 Via degli Orefici-San Lazzaro di Savena

== See also ==
- List of town tramway systems in Italy
- History of rail transport in Italy
- List of tram and light rail transit systems
- Trolleybuses in Bologna
