= Francesco Rizzoli =

Italian politician, surgeon and physician

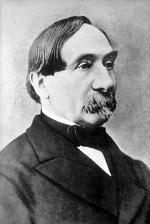
- Born: 11 July 1809; Milan
- Died: 24 May 1880 (aged 70); Bologna, Italy
- Occupation: Physician
- Known for: One of the fathers of modern orthopedics

Francesco Rizzoli (11 July 1809 – 24 May 1880) was an Italian politician, surgeon and medical doctor, considered one of the fathers of modern orthopedics. Doctor Joseph Ruggi speaks of him in his 1924 memoirs: "During the intervention he was in such a state that he was screaming like a madman, sustaining and railing against his assistants who were confused and upset [...] while the patient, who was awake, shouted from his lungs, unheeded, throwing insults at the surgeon and his assistants."

== Biography ==
=== Early years ===
Francesco Rizzoli was born in Milan on 11 July 1809, son of Gaetano Maria Rizzoli and Trovamola. His father was a lieutenant in the army of Napoleon and Murat, and was killed in 1814 by brigands in Calabria when his son was only five years old. The orphaned Francesco was entrusted to his paternal uncle Vincenzo, who lived in Bologna with his sister Teresa.

Francesco Rizzoli spent his youth in Bologna, where he attended school. He lived in a sober and simple manner, and despite his modest economic conditions was able to obtain a degree in medicine in 1828 and a master's degree in surgery from the University of Bologna, then under the rule of the Papal States.

=== Academic and medical careers ===
Following an intense and productive postgraduate training he obtained a position of assistant to Paolo Baroni, Rizzoli's brother in law, who was a professor at the University and director of the hospital of the Abbandonati. When Baroni became chief physician of Pope Gregory XVI in Rome, in 1842 Rizzoli was appointed chief surgeon of the hospital.

From 1838 to 1849 he was substitute professor of obstetrics, when he was awarded the chair of clinical surgery that he held until 1865. In the following years he visited the surgical institute of Joseph-François Malgaigne in Paris. On his return he repeatedly demanded improved sanitation and teaching conditions at the hospital, so differences arose between him and the ministry, and the professor was dismissed.

In private practice, Rizzoli dedicated his activities to the Maggiore Hospital, where he also treated private clients. In 1868 he was again entrusted the Chair of Surgery, and in 1876 he was asked to succeed Luigi Porta as a professor of clinical surgery at the University of Pavia. During the cholera epidemic he ran the military hospital of Ricovero and also oversaw the San Lodovico hospital. For his work during the outbreak he received the diploma of admission to the nobility of Bologna.

=== Political career ===
Professionally, the illustrious doctor was highly respected and appreciated not only locally, and he served in various political positions at the national level. He was an ardent patriot and served as a surgeon during the wars of independence. In 1859 he was appointed a deputy of the National Assembly for the people of Romagna, and voted for the removal of the papal government. From 12 February 1862 until his death he was a member of the provincial council of Bologna. He was called by the Prime Minister Urbano Rattazzi, along with Luigi Porta, to examine Giuseppe Garibaldi after the injury he suffered in Aspromonte. He managed to avoid the need for amputation by diagnosing that the bullet had bounced and they had to just wait for the wound to heal.

In 1879, a year before his death, he was appointed by King as Senator of the XIII legislature. He died in Bologna on February 24, 1880. His body was embalmed with arsenic injection by Professor Romei.

== Lifetime vision ==
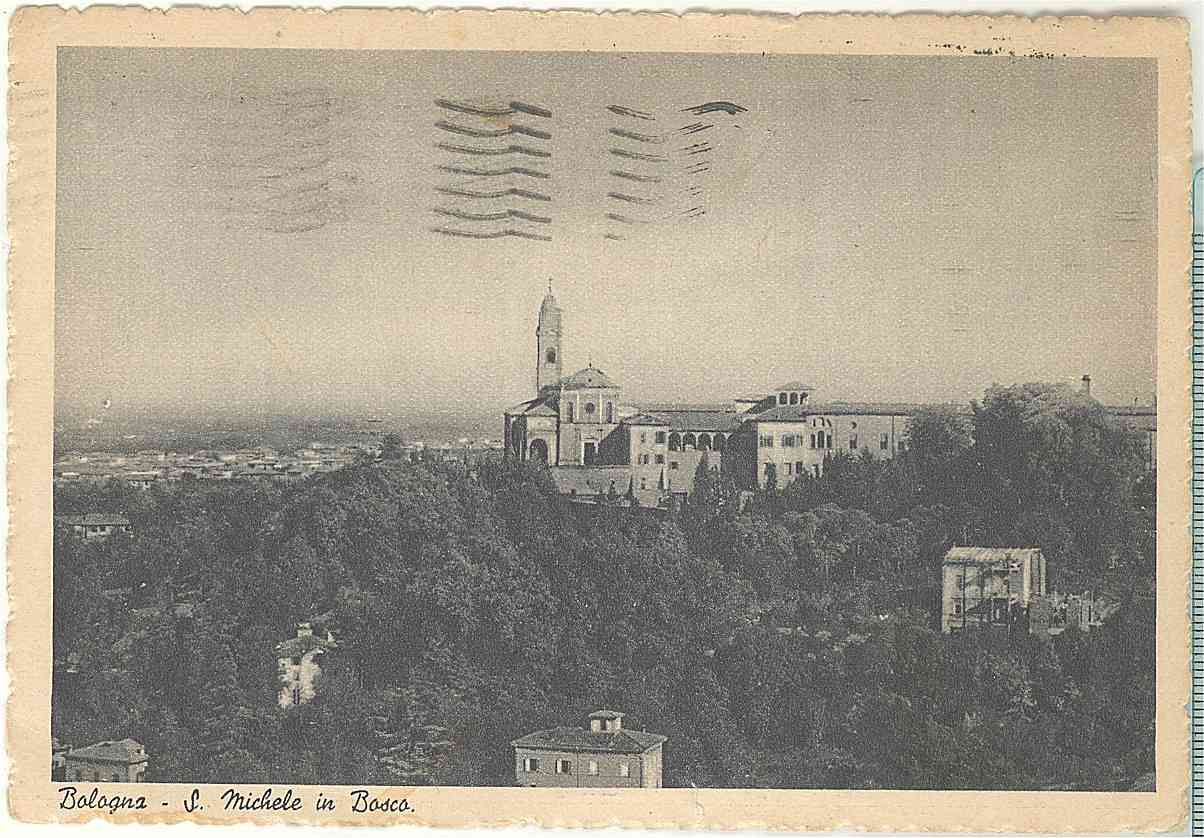
A postcard from 1954 depicting the complex of San Michele in Bosco

Rizzoli had no family of his own, and donated his wealth (approximately £1,754,894) to the provincial administration of Bologna for the realization of his dream: to build not only a large, clean and modern hospital for the prevention and treatment of deformities of the body, but a hospital where it would be possible to implement the surgical treatment of rickets and birth defects, a hospital where everything he had seen during his travels abroad could be applied, a hospital where the first results of the studies of Joseph Lister could be exploited.

With this hospital Rizzoli wanted to achieve both the advancement of science and the relief of suffering humanity. In 1879 the professor Rizzoli bought for £55,000 the Olivetani convent, a structure adjacent to the church of San Michele in Bosco, from the State. (Note: The dedication on the wall of the Institute describes the building as a "suburban villa".) The large complex had been expropriated during the Napoleonic era and later used as a "house of strength" for those sentenced to life imprisonment. The project was realized after his death by the provincial administration. The institute was inaugurated by the King Umberto I of Italy on 28 June 1896 as the Rizzoli Orthopaedic Institute, and for in the next century was one of the best orthopedic hospitals in the world.

== Character ==
Rizzoli had a severe personality, solitary and commanding, disciplined and made stronger by his difficult youth and by the poor health that surrounded him in his work. He was considered a miser. After his death envelopes were found that contained money earned for his services that were still sealed. At the same time, however, he was a very generous person, attentive to the needs of his patients and his assistants.

He was visionary in predicting the separation in a short time of surgery of the skeletal system from general surgery. He became a dominant figure in the medical circles of Bologna, holding the prestigious positions of president of the local Academy of Science and, for twenty years from 1854 to 1876, president of the society of medical surgery. He was famous for the great speed of his operations, which was of the utmost importance at a time when surgery was still in its early development, a period in which anesthesia (he was among the first to use chloroform in November 1847) and sterility were in their infancy. He was also the author of studies on thyroid surgery and diseases of the arteries.

== Trivia ==
Rizzoli wrote many scientific papers, some of which were collected in two volumes, printed in 1869, and translated into French, which appeared in two editions of 1872 and 1875. Many of his treasures are preserved in the "Rizzoli Museum", including the bone-breaking instrument that Rizzoli used to shorten limbs or rebalance them with shorter ones.

In memory of the day of his birth, Gino Rocchi posted a beautiful mural inscription at the Rizzoli Orthopedic Hospital.

Rizzoli invented and perfected several medical tools:

- He devised a hooked forceps, built by Fratelli Lollini. The technique of applying the forceps involved insertion into the uterus of the left valve, then into the right and their subsequent joining at the level of the closure.
- He designed a kind of headphone earmuffs, which was worn by the doctor who still preferred to operate guided by the cries of the sick, but preferably slightly muffled cries. They are kept in the third room of the Umberto I library.

== Memorials ==
One of the central streets of Bologna, a portion of the Via Aemilia from Piazza Maggiore to the Two Towers is named Via Francesco Rizzoli.

The Rizzoli Orthopedic Institute (Bologna) carries his name.

== Honors ==
- Knight of the Grand Cross decorated with the Gran Cordone dell'Ordine dei Santi Maurizio e Lazzaro
- Knight of the Grand Cross decorated with the Gran Cordone dell'Ordine della Corona d'Italia
- Official of the Orders of Saints Maurice and Lazarus
- Commander of the Order of the Crown of Italy

== Publications ==
- 1858: Operazioni chirurgiche eseguite in diversi casi onde togliere la immobilità della mascella inferiore (surgical operations carried out in different cases so as to remove the immobility of the lower jaw) (20 pagine)
- 1860: Nuovo metodo per la cura di alcune varietà d' ernia inguinale congenita associate alla presenza del testicolo nel canale inguinale (letta nella sessione del 15 novembre) (A new method for the treatment of certain varieties of 'congenital inguinal hernia associated with the presence of the testis in the inguinal canal (read at the meeting of 15 November))
- 1863: Aneurismi inguinali e di uno popliteo ottenuto mediante un semplicissimo mezzo di compressione (letta nella sessione del 12 novembre dell'Accademia delle Scienze)
- 1867: Terebrazione del cranio in un epiletico (24 pagine)
- 1869: Collezione delle memorie chirurgiche ed ostetriche (577 pagine)
- 1875: Della onichia ulcerosa lurida e della maligna (42 pagine)
- 1878: Emostasia diretta nella cura di aneurismi traumatici e di ricorrenti emorragie per ferite od ulcerazioni di arterie degli arti toracici (41 pagine)
- 1880: Studi istofisio-anatomopatologici e clinici sull'ano preternaturale accidentale (37 pagine)

== Sources ==
- Bynum, W.F; Bynum, Helen (2007). Dictionary of medical biography. Vol. 4 (M-R). Westport, Connecticut - London: Greenwood Press.
- Cioni, Alfredo; Bertoli Barsotti, Anna Maria (1996). The Rizzoli Orthopedic Institute in San Michele in Bosco. The Artistic Heritage of the Monastery and the Historical Events of One Hundred Years of Orthopedic Surgery. Bologna: I.O.R.
- Obstetrical Society of London (1882). Transactions of the Obstetrical Society of London. Longman, Green, Longman, and Roberts.
- Paltrinieri, A. (2006). Il Monastero di San Michele in Bosco e l'Istituto ortopedico Rizzoli. Edizioni Pendragon. ISBN 978-88-8342-517-2.
