= Trams in Florence =

Tram system in Florence, Italy

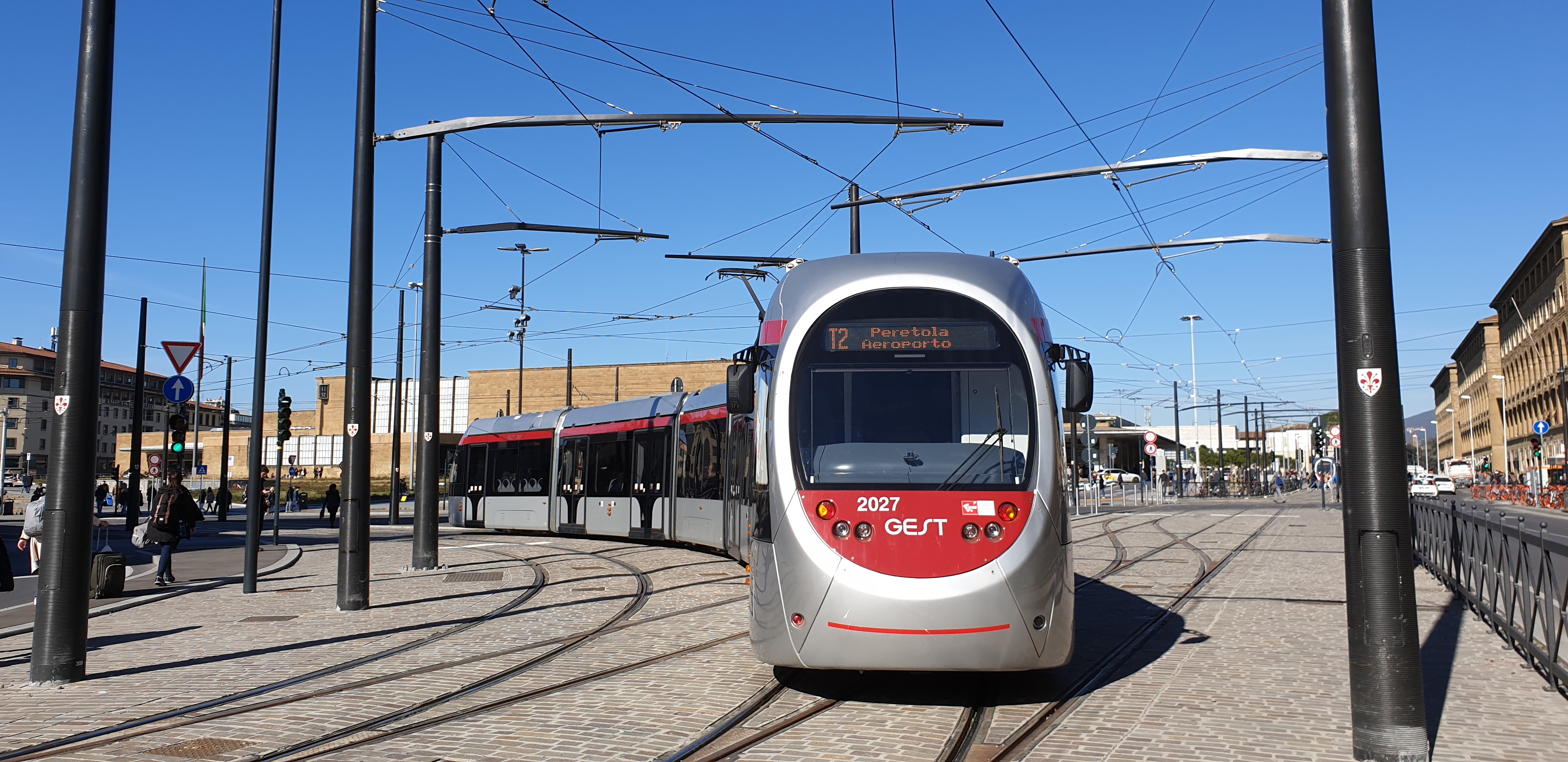

Overview
- Locale: Florence, Tuscany, Italy
- Transit type: Tram
- Number of lines: 2
- Number of stations: 38
- Daily ridership: 100,000 (2019)
- Annual ridership: 39 million (2024)
- Website: https://www.gestramvia.it/?lang=en

Operation
- Began operation: 14 February 2010
- Operator: GEST
- Number of vehicles: 17 AnsaldoBreda Sirio
- Train length: 32 m
- Headway: 4–6 minutes

Technical
- System length: 19.3 km (12.0 mi)
- Track gauge: 1,435 mm (4 ft 8 1/2 in)
- Electrification: 750 V DC
- Top speed: 70 km/h (43 mph)
System map

The Florence tramway network (Italian: Rete tranviaria di Firenze) is an important part of the public transport network of Florence, Italy. It consists of two operational light rail lines.

Florence, like many other Italian cities, closed down its old tramway network at the end of the 1950s, but restarted operating trams since 2010 to find a solution to the traffic jams within the city. The first line in the present network was opened in 2010 to link the city center with the neighboring comune of Scandicci; the second line opened on 11 February 2019, linking the city center with Florence Airport.

The current network operator is GEST (Gestione Servizio tramviario), a subsidiary of the French RATP.

== History ==
=== 1879–1958 ===
The first horse-drawn tramway in Florence was inaugurated on 5 April 1879. It linked the city center to Peretola. One year later the original line was extended to reach Prato and Poggio a Caiano. The tramway was managed by Società dei Tramways Fiorentini.

In 1898, the company bought out Tranvia del Chianti company and in the same year the lines were electrified. In 1926, the tram was considered already obsolete, and the first bus routes started. In 1934 the company responsible for the service went out of business.

During the Second World War the tramway was severely damaged, and the network was fully restored only in 1951. From the end of the war the tramway was managed by ATAF. After few years, the infrastructure was deemed too old and inadequate, and the tramway was definitively closed on 20 January 1958.

=== Modern tramway (2010) ===
During the early 2000s, the Florence administration decided to restore the tram service. Works on the first line started in December 2005. Construction works were expected to last for 1,000 days, but eventually it took more than 1,800 days to complete the line.

Line 1 started operation on 14 February 2010. The first part of Line 1, at Scandicci, was the first rail public transport service in the area. During the first 10 months of service, the total passenger served were 7 million, a result considered a success.

On 16 July 2018, the line was extended from Florence Santa Maria Novella railway station to the current northern terminus, Careggi.

== Lines ==
Line	Terminals		Opened	Latest extension	Length (km)	Stops
T1	Villa Costanza (Scandicci)	Careggi	2010	2018	11.5	26
T2	Peretola Aeroporto	San Marco-Università	2019	2025	8.4	21

Service starts at 5:30 and stops at 0:30. The headway is 4 minutes from 7:30 to 20:30 and 6 minutes at other times. A journey from end to end of Line 1 takes about 23 minutes. Line 2 opened on February 11, 2019. A journey from end to end takes 22 minutes.

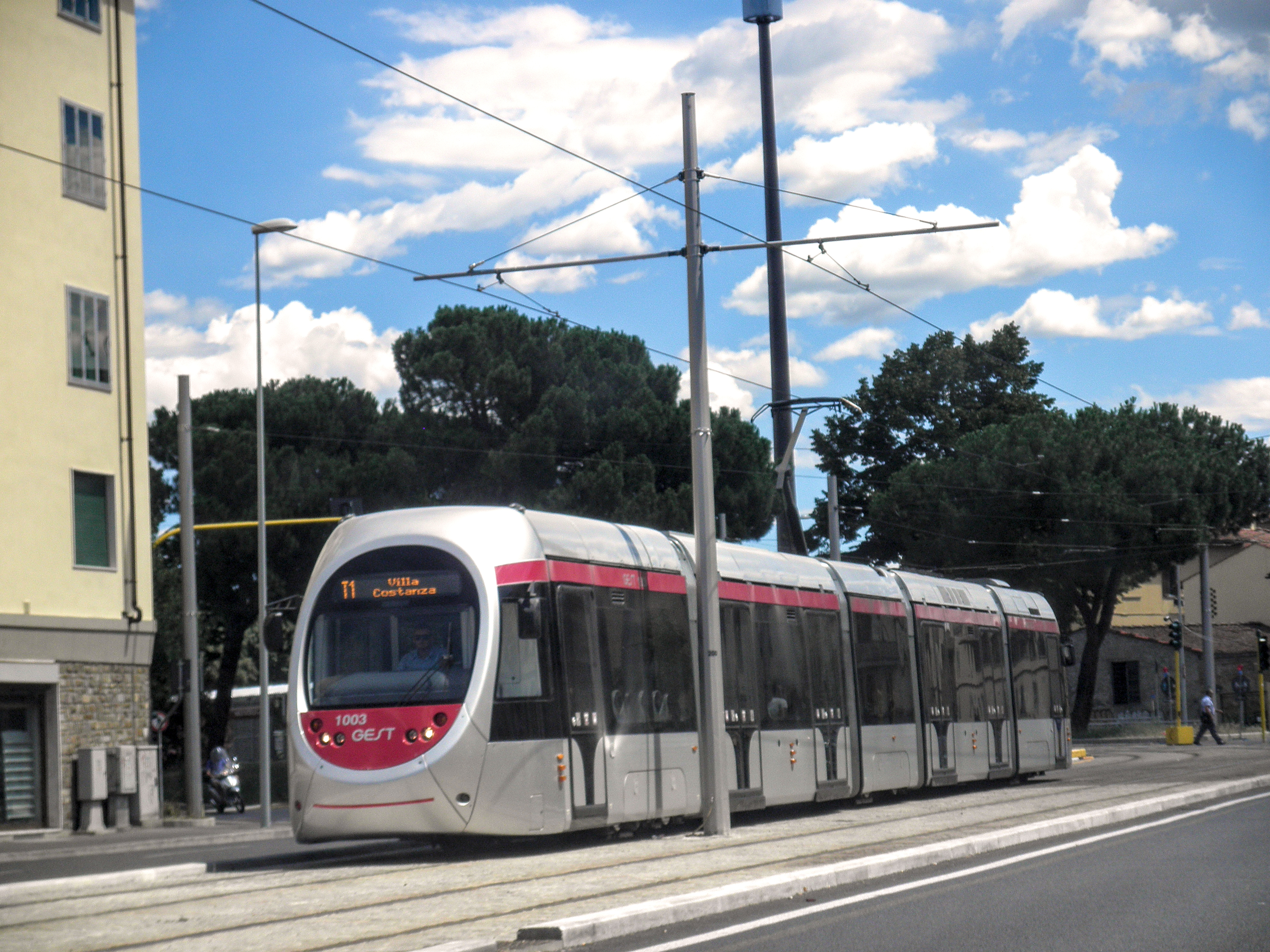
The Sirio 1003

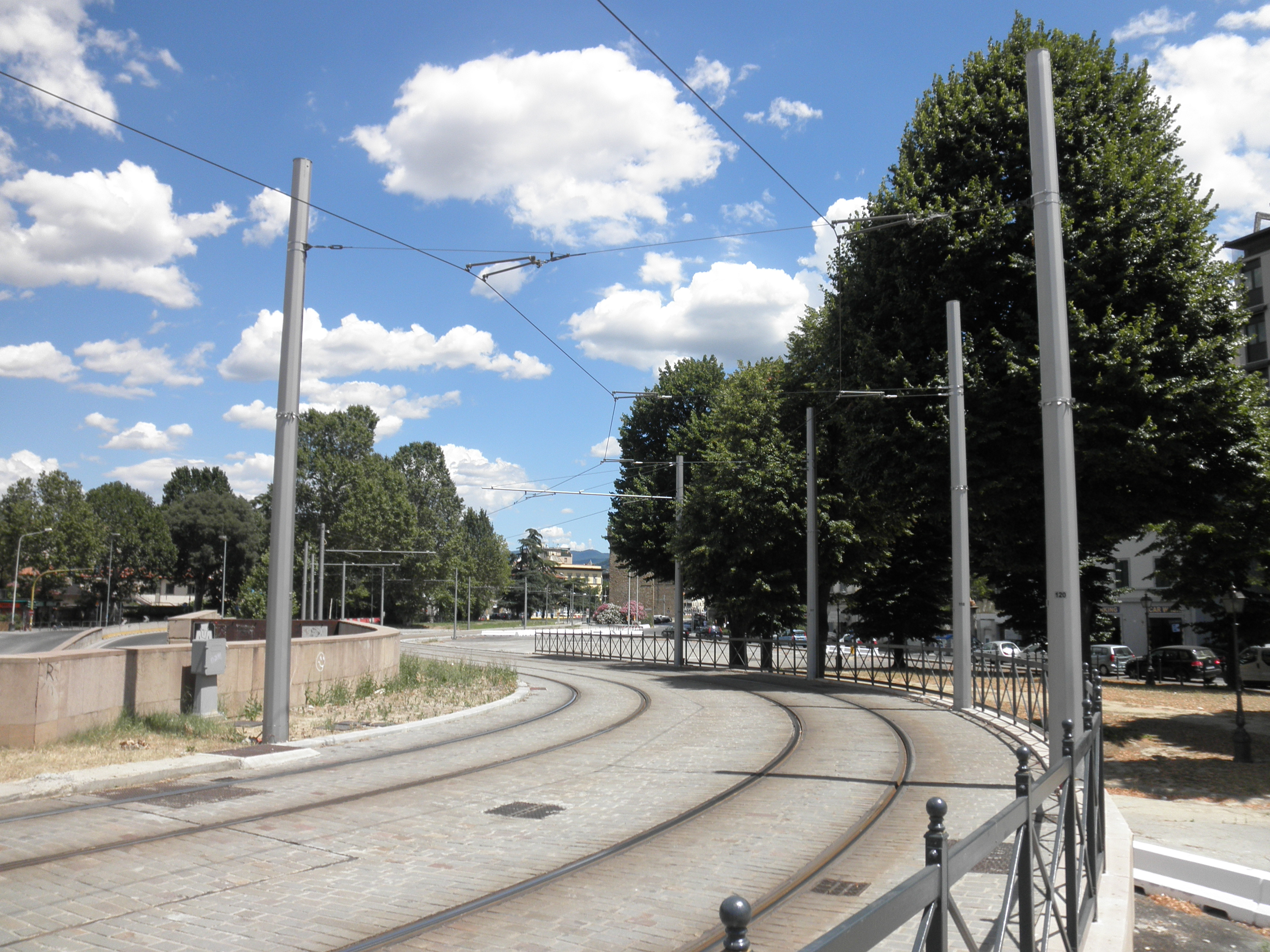
Tramway in piazza Vittorio Veneto

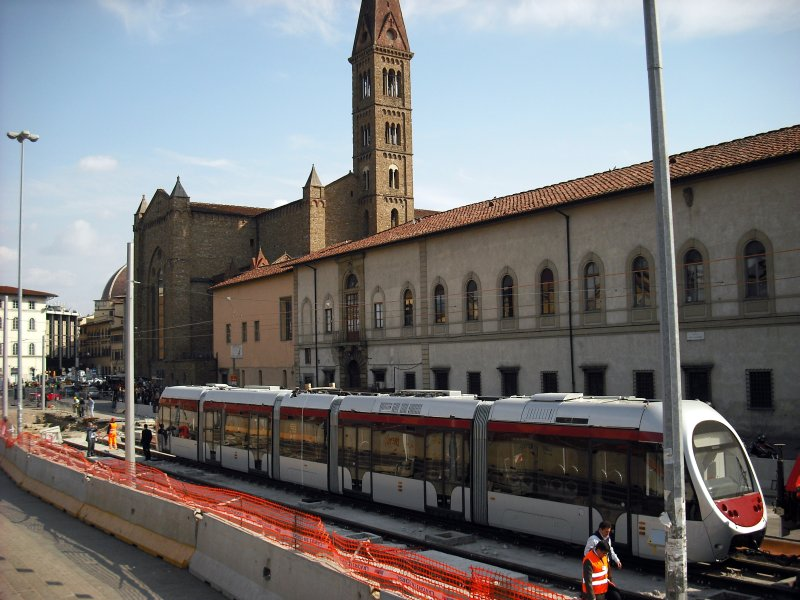
Tramway test

== Fares ==
Fares for Florentine trams are €1.70 per ride, or €15.50 for a ten ride strip. These can be purchased at tramway stations. Tickets must be validated after boarding; failure to do so will result in a €40 fine.

== Technical summary ==
The rolling stock of Line 1 consists of 19 AnsaldoBreda Sirio, already in use in other cities in Italy and around the world. The route is mainly on reserved lanes. Stops are located at a distance of 300–400 metres (980–1,310 ft).

== Extension of the network ==
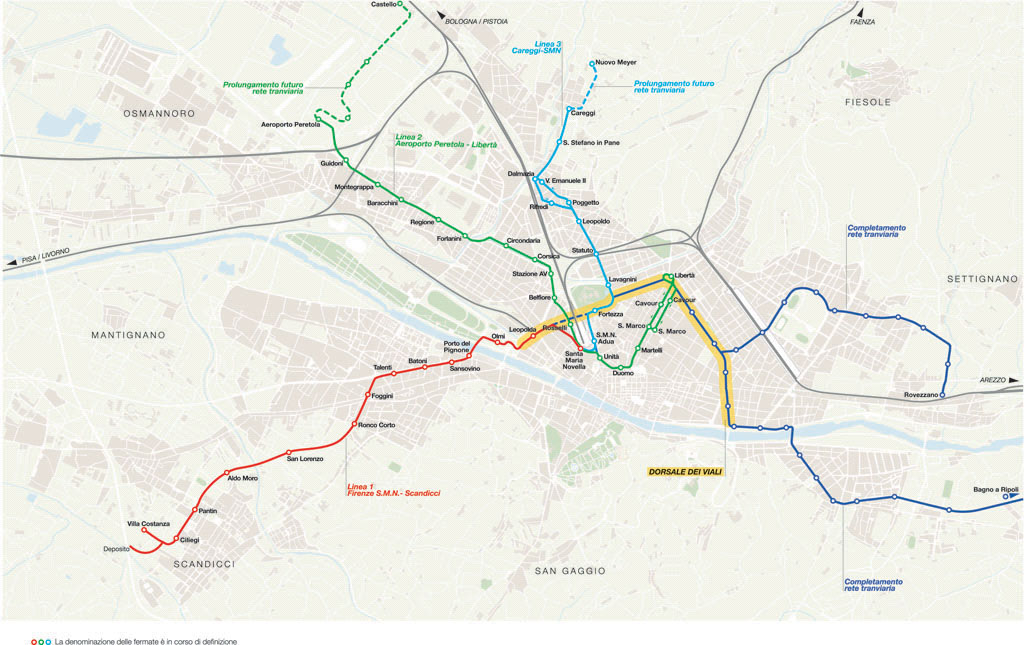
Map of the planned tramway

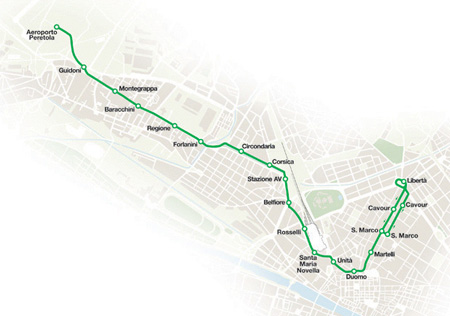
Line 2

Line	Terminals		Opening (planned)	Length (km)	Stops
T1	Villa Costanza (Scandicci)	Pontignale	?	?	14
T4	Santa Maria Novella	Le Piagge	2018	?	?

=== Line 1 extension ===
An expansion from Scandicci towards Casellina and Pontignale is planned. The new terminus will be near an exit of the A1 motorway. A Park & Ride will also be built.

=== Line 2 ===
Line 2 currently runs from the airport to Santa Maria Novella railway station, where it interchanges with line 1. From here, the line should run through the city center in two different branches, also serving the Duomo in the initial planning. However, after the recent revisions, the line will probably not pass in Duomo and will run partly underground (4 stops). As of 2022, the route has been finalised for completion at the end of 2023, with new stops at Lavagnini, Poliziano, Parterre, Libertà, Cavour and Piazza San Marco. There will be two Cavour stops as the line will follow the street one-way system.

Line 2 will be 7.5 km (4.7 mi) long and will be fundamental in serving the city center, which is planned to become mainly pedestrian.

=== Line 3 ===
The name Line 3 was used for the Line 1 section between Santa Maria Novella and Careggi. This section was fully opened on 16 July 2018 and it has now been incorporated into Line 1.

=== Line 4 ===
Line 4 is the long-term plan which will complete the city tramway. The line will have a terminus at Santa Maria Novella railway station and will serve the western part of the city.

== Controversies ==
There were some people who opposed the new tramway lines 2 and 3. A city referendum was held on 17 February 2008. The statute of city referendums do not contains any quorum clause. Of the 39% of the citizens that voted, the majority was against the construction. The municipality decided to disregard the result of the referendum.

== See also ==
- List of town tramway systems in Italy
- History of rail transport in Italy
- Rail transport in Italy
- List of tram and light rail transit systems
