= List of town tramway systems in Italy =

This is a list of town tramway systems in Italy by region. It includes all tram systems in Italy, past and present; cities with current operating systems, and those systems themselves, are indicated in bold and blue background colored rows. The use of the diamond (♦) symbol indicates where there were (or are) two or more independent tram systems operating concurrently within a single metropolitan area. Those tram systems that operated on other than standard gauge track (where known) are indicated in the 'Notes' column.

== Abruzzo ==
Location	Relevant Wikipedia Article	Traction Type	Date (From)	Date (To)	Notes
L'Aquila		Electric	?	?	
Chieti		Electric	1905	1944	Gauge: 950 mm (3 ft 1 3/8 in)
Pescara		Electric	1934	1960	Gauge: 950 mm (3 ft 1 3/8 in)
Sulmona		Electric	1908	1944	Gauge: 1,000 mm (3 ft 3 3/8 in)

== Apulia (Puglia) ==
Location	Relevant Wikipedia Article	Traction Type	Date (From)	Date (To)	Notes
Bari		Electric	1909	1948 or 1952 (?)	Gauge: 1,000 mm (3 ft 3 3/8 in)
Taranto		Electric	1922	1950	Gauge: 1,000 mm (3 ft 3 3/8 in)

== Calabria ==
Location	Relevant Wikipedia Article	Traction Type	Date (From)	Date (To)	Notes
Catanzaro		Electric	1910	1954	
Reggio di Calabria		Horse	?	?	
Reggio di Calabria		Electric	1918	1928	Gauge: 1,000 mm (3 ft 3 3/8 in)

== Campania ==
Location	Relevant Wikipedia Article	Traction Type	Date (From)	Date (To)	Notes
Naples (Napoli)	Trams in Naples	Horse	1875	?	
Naples (Napoli)	Trams in Naples	Steam	?	?	
Naples (Napoli)	Trams in Naples	Electric	1899		Gauge: 1,445 mm (4 ft 8 7/8 in)
Salerno		Electric	1922	1937	

== Emilia-Romagna ==
Location	Relevant Wikipedia Article	Traction Type	Date (From)	Date (To)	Notes
Bologna	Trams in Bologna	Horse	2 October 1880	1904	Gauge: 1,445 mm (4 ft 8 7/8 in)
Bologna	Trams in Bologna	Electric	11 February 1904	3 Nov 1963	Gauge: 1,445 mm (4 ft 8 7/8 in)
Bologna	Bologna tramway	Electric	Under construction (as of 2023)		Gauge: 1,435 mm (4 ft 8 1/2 in)
Ferrara		Electric	1910	1939	Gauge: 1,000 mm (3 ft 3 3/8 in)
Forlì		Steam	?	?	
Mirandola	Mirandola tramway	Horse	1904	1927	Gauge: 1,445 mm (4 ft 8 7/8 in)
Modena		Horse	?	?	Gauge: 1,000 mm (3 ft 3 3/8 in)
Modena		Electric	1912	1950	
Parma		Electric	1910	1954	
Piacenza		Electric	1910	1955	
Rimini		Horse	?	?	
Rimini		Electric	1921	1938	

== Friuli-Venezia Giulia ==
Location	Relevant Wikipedia Article	Traction Type	Date (From)	Date (To)	Notes
Gorizia		Horse	?	?	
Gorizia		Electric	1909	1935	Gauge: 1,000 mm (3 ft 3 3/8 in)
**↘ Trieste**
♦ Trieste urban network	Trams in Trieste	Horse	1876	1914	Gauge: 1,445 mm (4 ft 8 7/8 in)
♦ Trieste urban network	Trams in Trieste	Electric	1900	1970	Gauge: 1,445 mm (4 ft 8 7/8 in)
♦ Trieste - Opicina	Trieste–Opicina tramway	Electric	1902		Gauge: 1,000 mm (3 ft 3 3/8 in)
Udine		Horse	?	?	
Udine		Electric	1908	1952	Gauge: 1,000 mm (3 ft 3 3/8 in)

== Lazio ==
Location	Relevant Wikipedia Article	Traction Type	Date (From)	Date (To)	Notes
Fiuggi		Electric	1917	1962	
Frosinone		Electric	1917	1937	
**↘ Rome**
♦ Rome (Roma) urban network	Trams in Rome	Horse	1877	1905	
♦ Rome (Roma) urban network	Trams in Rome	Electric	1895		Gauge: 1,445 mm (4 ft 8 7/8 in)
♦ Rome (Roma) - Tivoli		Steam	1879	1931	Gauge: 1,445 mm (4 ft 8 7/8 in)
♦ Castelli Romani suburban tramway		Electric	1903	1980	Gauge: 1,445 mm (4 ft 8 7/8 in)

== Liguria ==
Location	Relevant Wikipedia Article	Traction Type	Date (From)	Date (To)	Notes
Genoa (Genova)		Horse	1878	?	
Genoa (Genova)		Steam	?	?	
Genoa (Genova)		Electric	1893	1966	Gauge: 1,000 mm (3 ft 3 3/8 in). Metro line opened 13 June 1990 uses former tramway tunnel.
Imperia		Electric	1926	1947	Gauge: 1,000 mm (3 ft 3 3/8 in)
Sanremo		Electric	1913	1948	
Savona		Electric	1912	1948	Gauge: 1,000 mm (3 ft 3 3/8 in)
Sestri Levante		Horse	?	?	
La Spezia		Electric	1902	1953	
Ventimiglia		Electric	1901	1936	

== Lombardy (Lombardia) ==
Location	Relevant Wikipedia Article	Traction Type	Date (From)	Date (To)	Notes
Bergamo		Horse	1875	?	
Bergamo		Steam	1884	1931	
Bergamo		Electric	1898	1958	Gauge: 1,000 mm (3 ft 3 3/8 in)
Bergamo	Bergamo–Albino light rail	Electric	25 Apr 2009		Light rail
Brescia	Trams in Brescia	Horse	1882	1909	
Brescia	Trams in Brescia	Electric	1907	1949	
Como		Electric	1899; 1906	1899; 1952	Gauge: 1,000 mm (3 ft 3 3/8 in)
Cremona		Electric	1916	1940	
Lecco		Electric	1927	1953	
Mantua (Mantova)		Electric	1914	1932	
Milan (Milano)	Trams in Milan	Horse	1881	1898	
Milan (Milano)	Trams in Milan	Electric	1893		Gauge: 1,445 mm (4 ft 8 7/8 in)
**↘ Pavia**
♦ Pavia		Electric	1913	1954	
♦ Certosa di Pavia		Horse	1913	1944	
Varese		Electric	1895	1953	
Viggiù		Electric	1912	1951	

== The Marches (Marche) ==
Location	Relevant Wikipedia Article	Traction Type	Date (From)	Date (To)	Notes
Ancona		Horse	1881	1909	
Ancona		Electric	1909	1949	
Offida		Electric	1926	1952	
Pesaro		Electric(?)	?	?	Peschkes (Part Two, 1987, p. 96) states that the existence of this tramway is confirmed only by a single map.

== Piedmont (Piemonte) ==
Location	Relevant Wikipedia Article	Traction Type	Date (From)	Date (To)	Notes
Alessandria		Steam	1880	?	
Alessandria		Electric	1913	1952	
Biella - Oropa		Electric	1911	1958	
Cuneo		Electric	?	?	
Monchiero – Dogliani		Electric	?	?	
Stresa		Electric	?	?	
**↘ Turin**
♦ Turin (Torino) urban network	Trams in Turin	Horse	1871	1900	
♦ Turin (Torino) urban network	Trams in Turin	Electric	1898		Gauge: 1,445 mm (4 ft 8 7/8 in)
♦ Torino – Brusasco		Steam/Electric	1881	1949	Electrified in 1908 to Chivasso, in 1931 from Chivasso to Brusasco.
♦ Torino – Pianezza		Steam/Electric	1884	1951	Electrified in 1930. Branch line to Druento and Venaria Reale.
♦ Torino – Pinerolo		Steam/Electric	1881	1958	Electrified in 1928 to Orbassano, in 1936 to Giaveno.
♦ Torino – Piobesi		Steam/Electric	1882	1936	Electrified in 1928 to Stupinigi. In 1936 became the urban line number 41.
♦ Torino – Poirino		Steam/Electric	1875	1949	Electrified in 1904 to Trofarello, in 1933 from Trofarello to Poirino.
♦ Torino – Rivoli		Electric	1914	1955	
♦ Torino – Saluzzo		Steam/Electric	1881	1950	Gauge: 1,100 mm (3 ft 7 5/16 in). Storage battery tram from 1930.
♦ Torino – Settimo		Steam/Electric	1884	1954	Electrified in 1924.
♦ Torino – Volpiano		Steam	1884	1931	
Valenza		Electric	1914	1947	

== Sardinia (Sardegna) ==
Location	Relevant Wikipedia Article	Traction Type	Date (From)	Date (To)	Notes
Cagliari		Steam	1888	?	
Cagliari		Electric	1915	1973	Gauge: 950 mm (3 ft 1 3/8 in)
Cagliari	Cagliari light rail	Electric	17 Mar 2008		Light rail. Gauge: 950 mm (3 ft 1 3/8 in). New system created by equipping a section of an existing railway line of Ferrovie della Sardegna as light rail transit.
Sassari	Metrosassari	Electric	27 Oct 2006		Gauge: 950 mm (3 ft 1 3/8 in)

== Sicily (Sicilia) ==
Location	Relevant Wikipedia Article	Traction Type	Date (From)	Date (To)	Notes
Catania		Electric	1905	1951	Gauge: 1,000 mm (3 ft 3 3/8 in)
Messina		Horse	?	?	
Messina		Steam	1890	1920	
Messina		Electric	1910	1951	Gauge: 950 mm (3 ft 1 3/8 in)
Messina	Trams in Messina	Electric	3 Apr 2003		
Palermo	Trams in Palermo	Horse	?	?	
Palermo	Trams in Palermo	Electric	1898	1946	Gauge: 1,000 mm (3 ft 3 3/8 in)
Palermo	Trams in Palermo	Electric	30 Dec 2015		
Trapani		Electric	1919(?)	1952	Gauge: 1,000 mm (3 ft 3 3/8 in)

== Tuscany (Toscana) ==
Location	Relevant Wikipedia Article	Traction Type	Date (From)	Date (To)	Notes
Carrara		Electric	1915	1955	
Florence (Firenze)	Trams in Florence	Horse	?	?	
Florence (Firenze)	Trams in Florence	Steam	1881	?	
Florence (Firenze)	Trams in Florence	Electric	1890	1958	
Florence (Firenze)	Trams in Florence	Electric	14 Feb 2010		Gauge: 1,435 mm (4 ft 8 1/2 in)
Livorno		Horse	1881 (*)	?	According to point 15 at https://www.misteromania.it/cartoline_da/livorno.html
Livorno		Electric	1897	1944(?)	
Massa		Steam	1890	1932	
Montepulciano		Steam	?	?	
Pisa		Horse	?	?	
Pisa		Electric	1912	1952	Gauge: 1,000 mm (3 ft 3 3/8 in)
Viareggio		Electric	1909	1944(?)	

== Trentino-Alto Adige/Südtirol ==
Location	Relevant Wikipedia Article	Traction Type	Date (From)	Date (To)	Notes
**↘ Bolzano**
♦ Bolzano	Bolzano Tramway	Electric	1909	1948	Gauge: 1,000 mm (3 ft 3 3/8 in)
♦ Ritten (Soprabolzano/Oberbozen)	Rittnerbahn	Electric	1907		Gauge: 1,000 mm (3 ft 3 3/8 in). Bolzano to Ritten rack railway section closed in 1966; the Ritten section continues to operate.
**↘ Meran**
♦ Lana - Meran		Electric	?	?	
♦ Meran	Meran Tramway	Electric	1906	1956	Gauge: 1,000 mm (3 ft 3 3/8 in)
Trento - Malè	Ferrovia Trento-Malè	Electric	1909	1960	Gauge: 1,000 mm (3 ft 3 3/8 in). Rebuilt 1962 as a conventional railway, it continues to operate today, although no longer as a tramway.

== Umbria ==
Location	Relevant Wikipedia Article	Traction Type	Date (From)	Date (To)	Notes
Perugia	Trams in Perugia	Electric	1899	1946	Gauge: 1,000 mm (3 ft 3 3/8 in)
Terni		Electric	1901	1960	

== Veneto ==
Location	Relevant Wikipedia Article	Traction Type	Date (From)	Date (To)	Notes
Padua (Padova)		Horse	1983	1907	
Padua (Padova)		Electric	1907	1954	Gauge: 1,000 mm (3 ft 3 3/8 in)
Padua (Padova)	Trams in Padua	Electric	29 October 2007		Translohr.
Treviso		Electric	1910	1938(?)	Gauge: 1,000 mm (3 ft 3 3/8 in)
**↘ Venice**
♦ Lido		Steam	1882	?	
♦ Lido		Electric	1907	1941	Gauge: 1,000 mm (3 ft 3 3/8 in)
♦ Mestre		Steam	1891	?	
♦ Mestre		Electric	1905	1933	Gauge: 1,000 mm (3 ft 3 3/8 in)
♦ Mestre	Trams in Mestre	Electric	20 Dec 2010		Translohr.
**↘ Verona**
♦ Verona		Horse	1884	?	
♦ Verona		Electric	1908	1954	
♦ Verona – San Bonifacio		Electric	1912	1961	
♦ Caldiero – Tregnago		Electric	1921	1956	
♦ Villanova – San Giovanni Ilarione		Electric	1929	1956	
♦ Verona – Grezzana		Electric	1922	1958	
Vicenza		Electric	1910	1951	

== See also ==
- List of town tramway systems in Europe
- List of trolleybus systems in Italy
- List of tram and light rail transit systems
- List of metro systems
