= Mirandola railway station =

Railway station in Italy

Mirandola
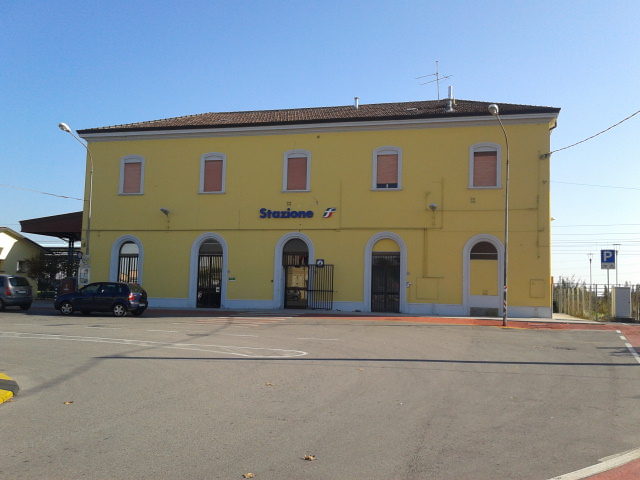
- The passenger building.

General information
- Location: Viale Antonio Gramsci, 322; 41037 Mirandola (MO); Mirandola, Modena, Emilia-Romagna; Italy
- Coordinates: 44.8917°N 11.1115°E
- Operator: Rete Ferroviaria Italiana
- Line: Verona Bologna
- Distance: 50 km (31 mi) from Bologna Centrale
- Train operators: Trenitalia; Ferrovie Emilia Romagna
- Connections: suburban shuttlebus

Other information
- Classification: Bronze

History
- Opened: 20 January 1902; 124 years ago

Passengers
- 2007: 290
Location
- Location within Emilia-Romagna Location within Northern Italy Location within Italy

Mirandola railway station is a railway stop along the Verona-Bologna railway serving the city of Mirandola, in the province of Modena, in Emilia-Romagna, Italy. The station serves also the municipalities of Medolla, Cavezzo, San Possidonio, and Finale Emilia. Located in the village of Cividale, about 3 km from the town centre of Mirandola, th station is connected by a SETA shuttle bus.

== History ==
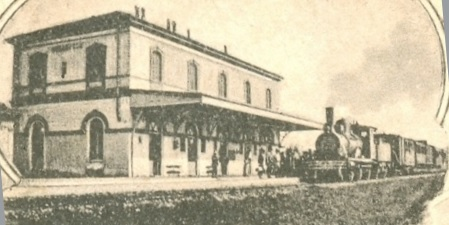
Mirandola station at the beginning of 20th century

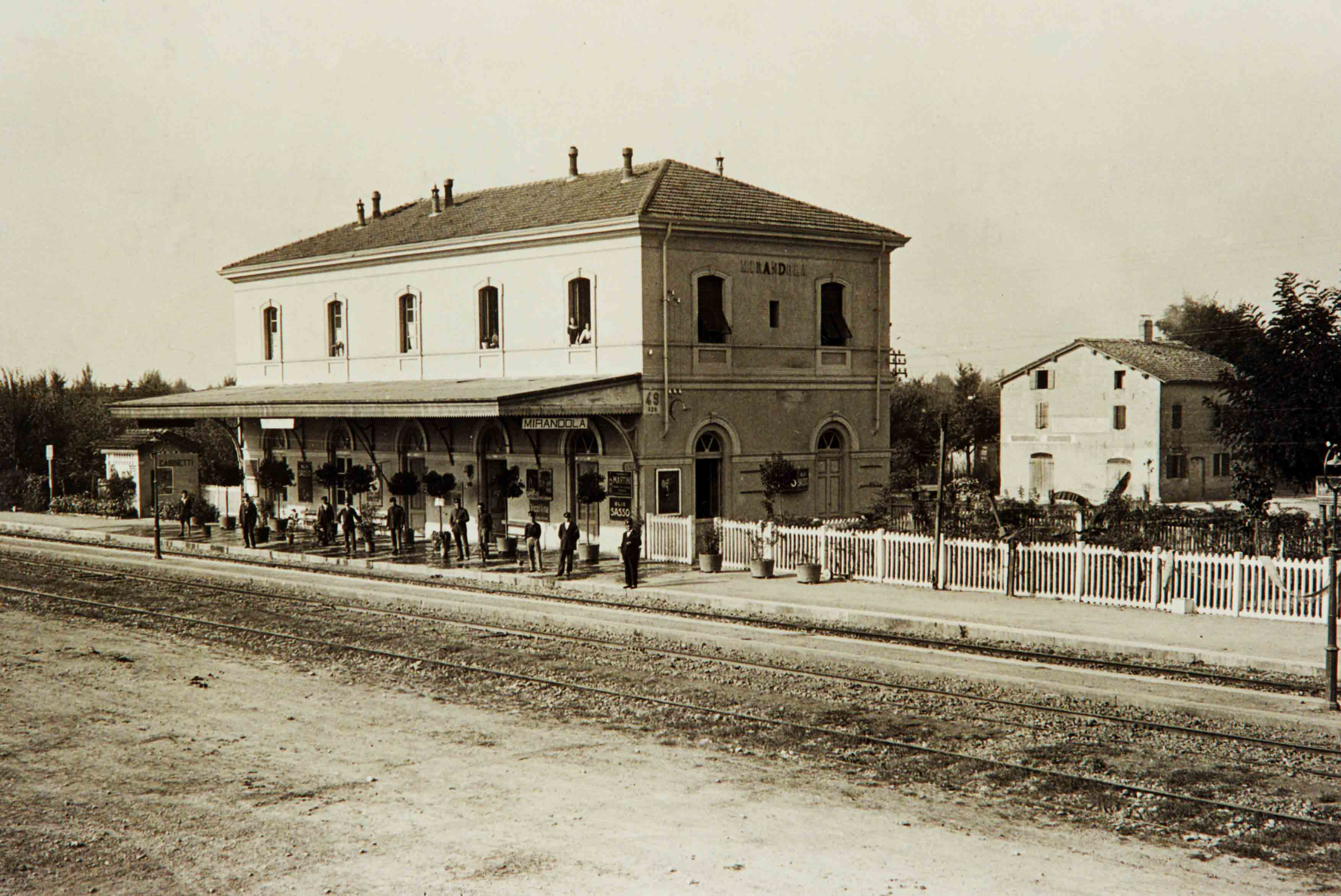
Mirandola station in the 1930s

The original railway station was built in 1901-1902 by the Società Italiana per le Strade Ferrate Meridionali, reusing the bricks of the town hall of Mirandola, which was under restoration at the time.

The station was inaugurated and opened to passengers on 20 January 1902, together with the Bologna-Verona railway, between the stations of San Felice sul Panaro and Poggio Rusco.

A horse-drawn tramway was built in 1904, connecting the station with the terminus at the Teatro Nuovo in Mirandola's main square until 1924.

On 3 May 1938, the Mirandola station, like all the others along the route, was lavishly decorated to greet the passage of Adolf Hitler on his way to Rome.

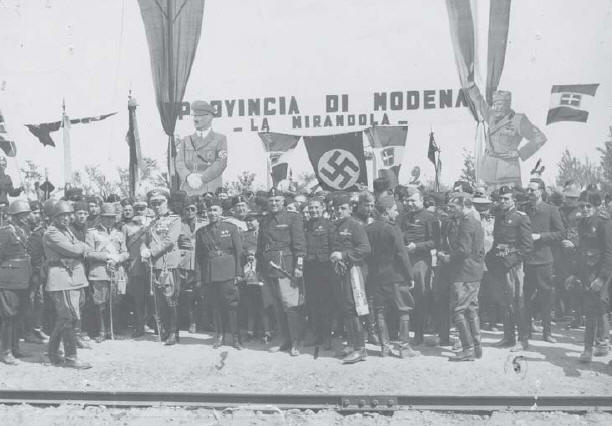

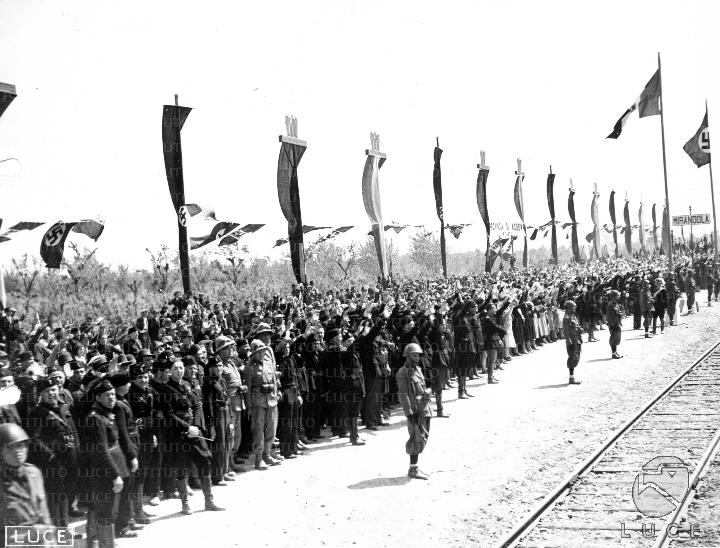

Located at kilometre 49+324 of the Verona-Bologna railway, until 2006 the station was equipped with a passenger building (which still exists, although the waiting room has been reduced), three tracks intended for passenger traffic (of which the second was properly laid out), three tracks intended as freight yards (unused for many years), and one track for parking trains.

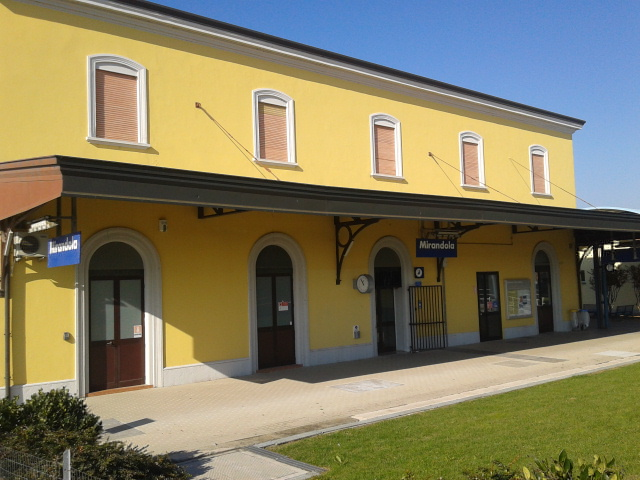
Mirandola station as seen from the first platform

In recent years, Mirandola station has not had a station master, and traffic on the system was managed remotely by the San Felice sul Panaro station manager.

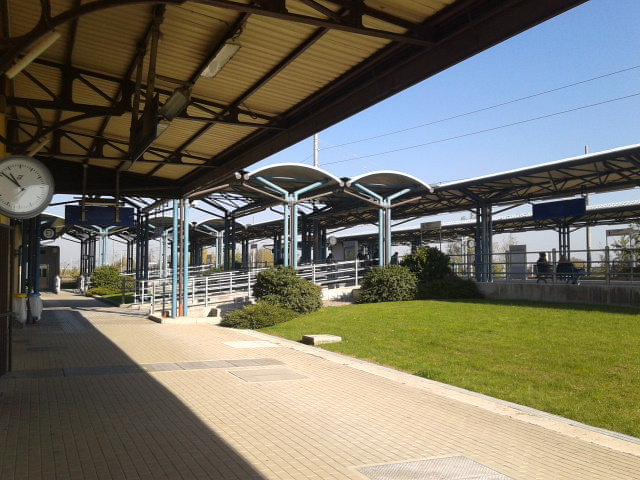
The Verona-Bologna line as seen from the station canopy

In autumn 2006, at the same time as the works to double the railway line, the station was deprived of tracks 3 and 4, in place of which the current doubled track and its platforms were placed, activated two years later together with an electrical substation (located to the south of the passenger building). Later, the old tracks 1 and 2 were also removed and replaced by grass.

It was downgraded to a railway stop on 26 October 2008, at the same time as the track was doubled between San Felice sul Panaro and Poggio Rusco section.

In the summer of 2009, the disused freight yard was dismantled and converted to a car park with 241 parking spaces (opened in late autumn). The redevelopment work was completed the following spring with the creation of covered paths to the car park, toilets (later closed), a waiting room and information displays. Other areas of the building were used as the civic hall of the Cividale fractional committee and the headquarters of the voluntary ecological guards.

== Train services ==
Mirandola is a stop for regional and fast regional trains to Bologna Centrale (southbound), and Poggio Rusco, Verona Porta Nuova, Bolzano and Brennero (northbound). The Bologna-Poggio Rusco service is operated by Ferrovie Emilia Romagna, while the others are managed by Trenitalia.

In the past, the Trieste Centrale-Lecce express train (cancelled in 2005) and the Brenner Express connecting Munich to Rome Termini, later limited to Florence SMN (cancelled in 2008) also stopped at Mirandola station.

In 2007, the facility had an average daily traffic of around 290 people.

The station is served by the following services as of December 2020:

Domestic

- Regional Train (Trenitalia Regional) Brennero/Brenner-Bologna centrale: Brennero/Brenner - Vipiteno/Sterzing - Fortezza/Franzensfeste - Bressanone/Brixen - Chiusa/Klausen - Bolzano/Bozen - Ora/Aura - Salorno/Salurn - Mezzocorona/Kronmetz - Trento/Trient - Rovereto/Rofreit - Ala/Ahl-am-Etsch - Verona Porta Nuova - Nogara - Poggio Rusco - Ostiglia - Bologna centrale
- Regional Train (Trenitalia Regional) Verona Porta Nuova-Bologna centrale: Verona Porta Nuova - Nogara - Poggio Rusco - Ostiglia - Bologna centrale
- Regional Train (Ferrovie Emilia Romagna Regional) Poggio Rusco-Bologna centrale

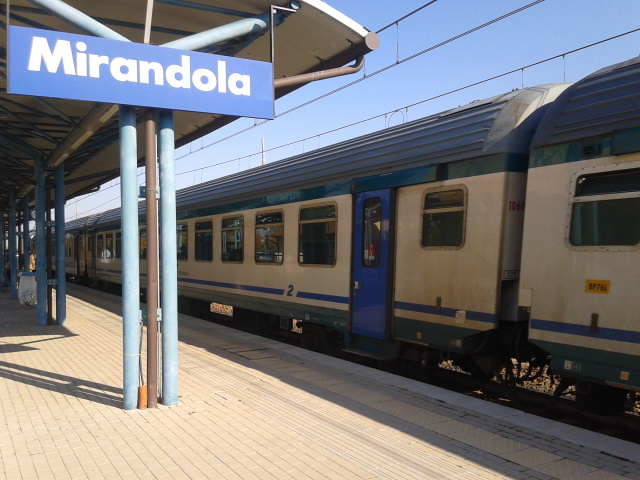
Train at Mirandola station

== Industrial risk ==
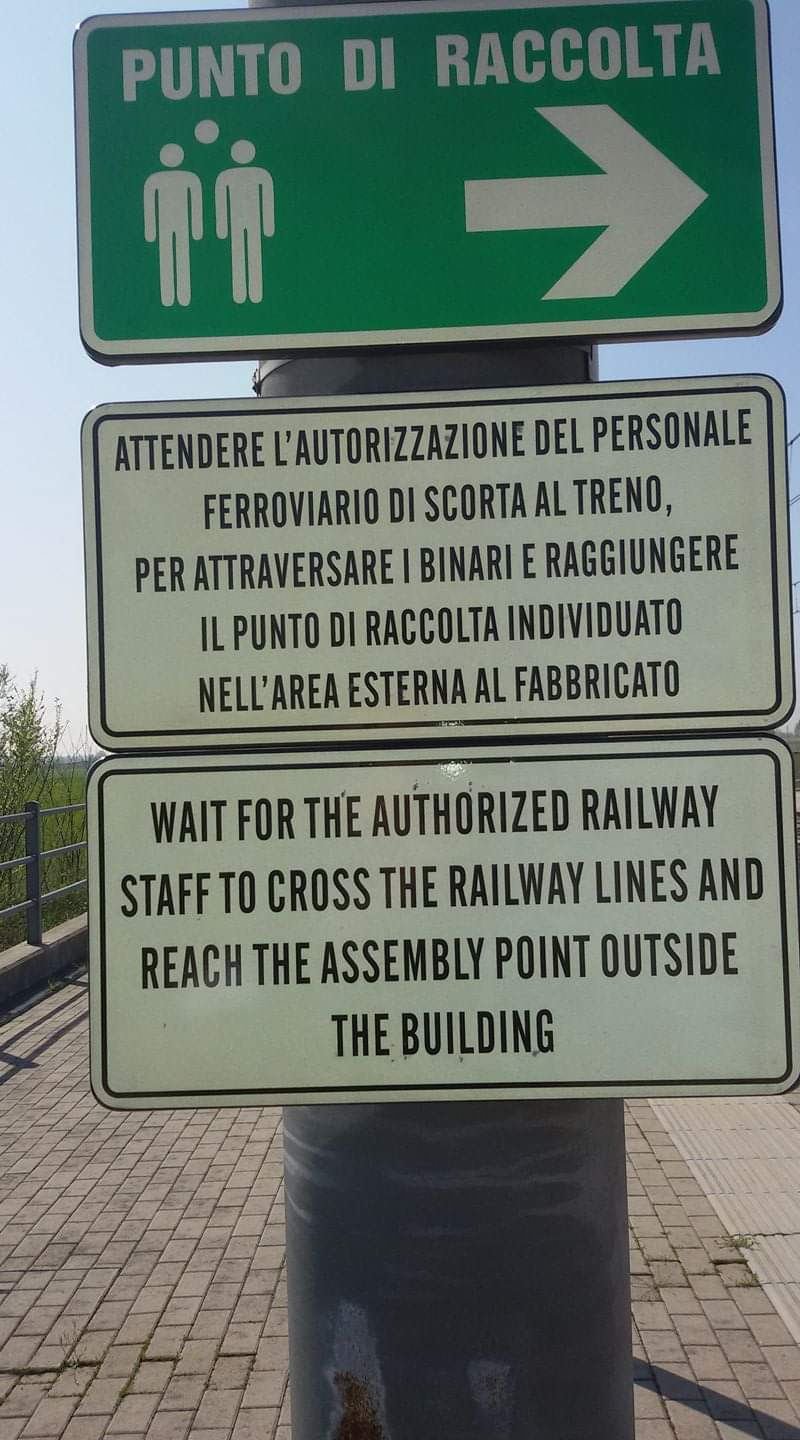
Notice on the high industrial risk area

Mirandola station is located in an area of high industrial risk under the "Seveso Directive", due to the presence of the nearby company Plein Air International, which produces gas cylinders and camping cartridges containing LPG gas. In the event of an accident or an alarm, travellers should move away and reach the collection points located in the southern part of the station platforms (in the direction of Bologna), without using the subway due to the risk of asphyxia: LPG in its gaseous state has a higher density than air and in the event of accidental spillage tends to concentrate, stagnating on the ground and in cavities, causing very dangerous situations of accumulation, with the risk of fire or asphyxiation.

== Other stations in Mirandola ==
Until 1964, Mirandola was also served by another railway station, the terminus of the Modena-Mirandola railway run by the Società Emiliana di Ferrovie Tranvie ed Automobili (SEFTA). The Mirandola SEFTA station (which still exists and has been converted into a bus station) is located in the centre of the town. In the 1930s, work began on the construction of a link between the two stations, in view of the construction of the Rolo-Mirandola railway, that was never activated.
