= Trams in Brescia =

Brescia tram network

Operation
- Locale: Brescia, Italy
- Open: 2030
- Status: planned
- Lines: 1
- Owner: City of Brescia
- Operator: Brescia Mobilità

Infrastructure
- Track gauge: 1,435 mm (4 ft 8 1/2 in) standard gauge

Statistics
- Route length: 11.3 kilometres (7.0 mi)
Horsecar era: 1882–1909
- Status: dismantled
- Routes: 5
- Owners: TPB, SEB
- Operators: TPB, SEB
- Track gauge: 1,435 mm (4 ft 8 1/2 in) standard gauge
- Propulsion system: Horse
- Depot: Porta Milano
Electric tram era: 1907–1949
- Status: dismantled
- Routes: 4÷7
- Owner: City of Brescia
- Operator: ASM Brescia
- Track gauge: 1,435 mm (4 ft 8 1/2 in) standard gauge
- Propulsion system: electric
- Electrification: 550÷600 V
- Depot: Vantiniano

The Brescia tramway network (Italian: Rete tranviaria di Brescia) was part of the public transport network of Brescia, Italy.

It dates back to horsecars which were replaced by electric trams from 1907; in the same year it became municipally owned. From 1936, tramway were gradually replaced by trolleybuses with the last tram line closing in 1949. At 2026, Brescia Mobilità, the local public transport company, is building a new tramway that will connect Pendolina to the train station and to the local trade fair.

== History ==
=== Horsecar era (1882–1909) ===
From April 1881 to June 1882, four interurban lines opened in the province of Brescia: Brescia-Orzinuovi-Soncino, Brescia-Vobarno, Brescia-Gardone Val Trompia and Brescia-Montichiari-Castiglione delle Stiviere.

A Belgian company, Tramways à vapeur de la province de Brescia' (TPB) operated three of them: Brescia-Gardone Val Trompia, Brescia-Orzinuovi-Soncino and Brescia-Vobarno. The tramway station was located near the city railway station. The municipal administration asked the TPB to build a horsecar line to connect the railway and tram stations to Piazza Duomo, where the city's New and Old Cathedrals are located. Soon, operating difficulties caused TPB to request the closure of the line between Corso del Teatro (since 1904, Corso Zanardelli) and Piazza Duomo. The municipal administration agreed on condition that TPB would built an extension from Corso del Teatro to Porta Venezia. The extension opened on 14 November 1882.

On 6 January 1883, the Porta Milano-Porta Venezia tram line was opened. At that time, the tram service consisted of two lines:

- Stazione (Railway Station)-Corso del Teatro-Porta Venezia, later Stazione-Corso del Teatro;
- Porta Milano-Porta Venezia.

On 6 September 1885, TPB opened the first tram line outside city walls which connected Porta Milano to Borgo San Giovanni. In the late 1880s, two other lines outside city walls were opened: Porta Trento-Stocchetta and Porta Venezia-Sant'Eufemia. These two lines used part of the interurbans which connected Brescia to Gardone Val Trompia and Vobarno respectively.

=== Electric tram era (1907–1949) ===
==== Expansion ====
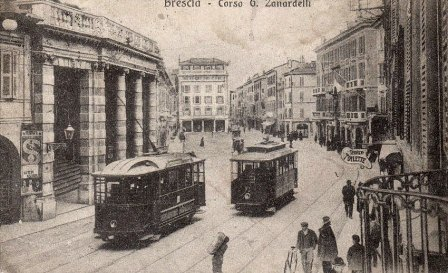
Electric trams in Corso Zanardelli, circa 1910

The first electric tram line opened on the occasion of a business exposition organized in the Castle of Brescia from May to October 1904. It connected Corso Zanardelli to the castle

The following year, Società Elettrica Bresciana (SEB) got the right to build an electric interurban that connected Brescia to Cellatica and Gussago. SEB also asked the municipal administration for permission to build a new urban line inside the city walls to connect Porta Trento to Porta Cremona using part of the exposition line, from Porta Trento to Corso Zanardelli. SEB got permission on 29 May 1905 and started construction the following month. SEB also wanted to buy the horse tram network from TBP, because it planned to electrify all the tram lines in order to promote itself to the citizens of Brescia. However, city council voted for tram municipalization on 5 June 1906.

Municipalization was confirmed by a city referendum on 3 February 1907. Nevertheless, SEB acquired the horsecar tram network from TPB and managed it from 1 May 1907. The first municipal electric tram line opened on 25 September 1907: it connected Porta Trento to Porta Cremona, a line left incomplete by SEB. On 6 January 1908, ASM Brescia, the municipally owned utility company, opened two new electrified tram lines: Stazione-Corso Zanardelli and Porta Milano-Porta Venezia. The last three horsecar tram lines were operated by SEB until the summer 1909 when the company closed them to focus on electric interurbans.

Brescia tram network in 1914

ASM Brescia extended the tram network in the following few years:

- New electrified line Porta Milano-Borgo San Giovanni-Ponte San Giacomo (opened 1912);
- New circular line that connected the railway station to Corso Zanardelli passing through Corso Martiri della Libertà, on the west, and Corso San Martino della Battaglia, on the east (opened 1913);
- New line Piazza Loggia-Mompiano (opened 1915);
- Extension from Porta Cremona to Forca di Cane (opened towards the end of 1915).

In the 1910s, the tram lines were numbered:

1. Porta Milano-Porta Venezia
2. Porta Trento-Forca di Cane
3. Porta Milano-Ponte San Giacomo
4. Zanardelli-Railway station (circular)
5. Piazza Loggia-Mompiano
6. Porta Trento-Castle

After the First World War, expansion of the tram system slowed, with the only new tram line opening in 1931. It connected Piazza San Barnaba, inside the city wall, to Sant'Eufemia. This line was in competition against the Brescia-Salò-Gargnano interurban, which operated on the opposite side of the same street.

==== Decline ====
After a failed bus service experiment to connect Sant'Eustacchio to Bottonaga, ASM decided to convert its tram system to trolleybus operation in order to reduce maintenance expenses.

The first trolleybus line started as an experiment replacing tram line 3 (Porta Milano-Ponte San Giacomo) in 1935, followed by a combined trolleybus-tram service in 1936 along tram line 4 (circular Zanardelli-Railway station-Zanardelli). On November 1937, tram lines 1 and 2 were converted to trolleybuses.

In 1938, the network was composed by three trolleybus lines (1, 2 and 4) and two tramway (5, via Pisacane-Mompiano, and 6, via Benacense-Sant'Eufemia). These were not connected to each other and thus required separate depots.

After Second World War, the new city administration planned to convert the last two tramway: via Benacense-Sant'Eufemia closing in 1948 and via Pisacane-Mompiano closing the following year.

=== Planned reintroduction ===
In 2018, Brescia Mobilità and the Italian state railway Ferrovie dello Stato Italiane (FS) signed an agreement for the construction of two tram lines in Brescia: one line would run from Pendolina in the northwest to the new PalaLeonessa (a.k.a. Pala Eib) sports centre in the southwest, mostly following bus route 2; the second route would connect Via Vallecamonica in the west and Viale Bornata in the east. In January 2021, faced with a new call for proposals from the Italian Ministry of Infrastructure and Transport (MIT), the municipal administration reintroduced the project for a single tram line, connecting the Pendolina district to the Fiera-Palaleonessa Exhibition Center. Collaboration between Brescia Mobilità and Ferrovie dello Stato was abandoned, and funding was requested for 99 percent of the costs, estimated at approximately €363 million. MIT would commit €359 million in 2021 and another €63 million in 2023.

On 24 July 2024, the city council approved the project, authorizing Brescia Mobilità to choose the contractor. In June 2025, Brescia Mobilità awarded a contract to a consortium led by Manelli Impresa, partnering with Hitachi Rail Italy, Alstom Ferroviaria and Alstom Transport, to build Brescia's T2 tram line, to connect the terminal stations of Pendolina and Fiera. Total investment amounts to €326 million, of which €161 million are for track construction (Manelli), €88 million for signaling (Alstom), and €77 million for rolling stock (Hitachi).

In July 2026, construction for line T2 started with a planned opening in 2030. The expected cost is €426 million. The consortium building the line would consist of Manelli Impresa (49.4%), Alstom (26.95%), and Hitachi Rail (23.65%).

== Modern tramway ==
=== Planned urban tramway ===
Planned network according to 2024 project

Brescia planned for the construction of two new tram lines, labelled T2 and T3. Line T2 would run north-south from Pendolina to Fiera; line T3 would run east-west from Sant'Eufemia to Mandolossa. There would be a shared segment in the city centre between Colombo and Solferino. Only line T2 will be built in the immediate future.

Line T2 will be 11.3 kilometres (7.0 mi) long, double-tracked throughout, and largely at ground level. To preserve the cityscape, there will be no overhead lines on 3.1 kilometres (1.9 mi) of the route in the old town where the vehicles will run on battery power. There will be 21 stops along the line. At San Faustino and the main railway station (Stazioni stop), there will be connections to the automated light metro M1. Seventy-two percent of the line will be separated from road traffic. Between the Fossa Bagni-Castello railway station and in the area of Via Solferino, there will be two single-track sections due to the narrow streets. Between the Colombo and Fiumicello stops, the line will cross the Mela River along Via Volturno. Between the Fossa Bagni-Castello and Mazini stops, the line will run through the 430-metre (1,410 ft)-long Galleria Tito Speri, a tunnel under the Brescia castle.

Brescia will use 18 RailLIVe ("Light Inspiring Vehicle") trams from Hitachi Rail. Each tram will accommodate a total of 216 passengers, 52 seated, and will be fully air-conditioned. The vehicles will be equipped with an Advanced Driver Assistant System (ADAS), whose anti-collision function detects potential hazards from people or vehicles on the track. The new vehicles are expected to be 98 percent recyclable and consume 15 to 20 percent less electricity thanks to energy recovery during braking and an innovative Eco-Drive algorithm.

The main depot will be located at the southern end of the line at Fiera, with a secondary depot at the northern end at Pendolina.

== See also ==
- List of town tramway systems in Italy
