= Piazza Galvani =

Square in Bologna

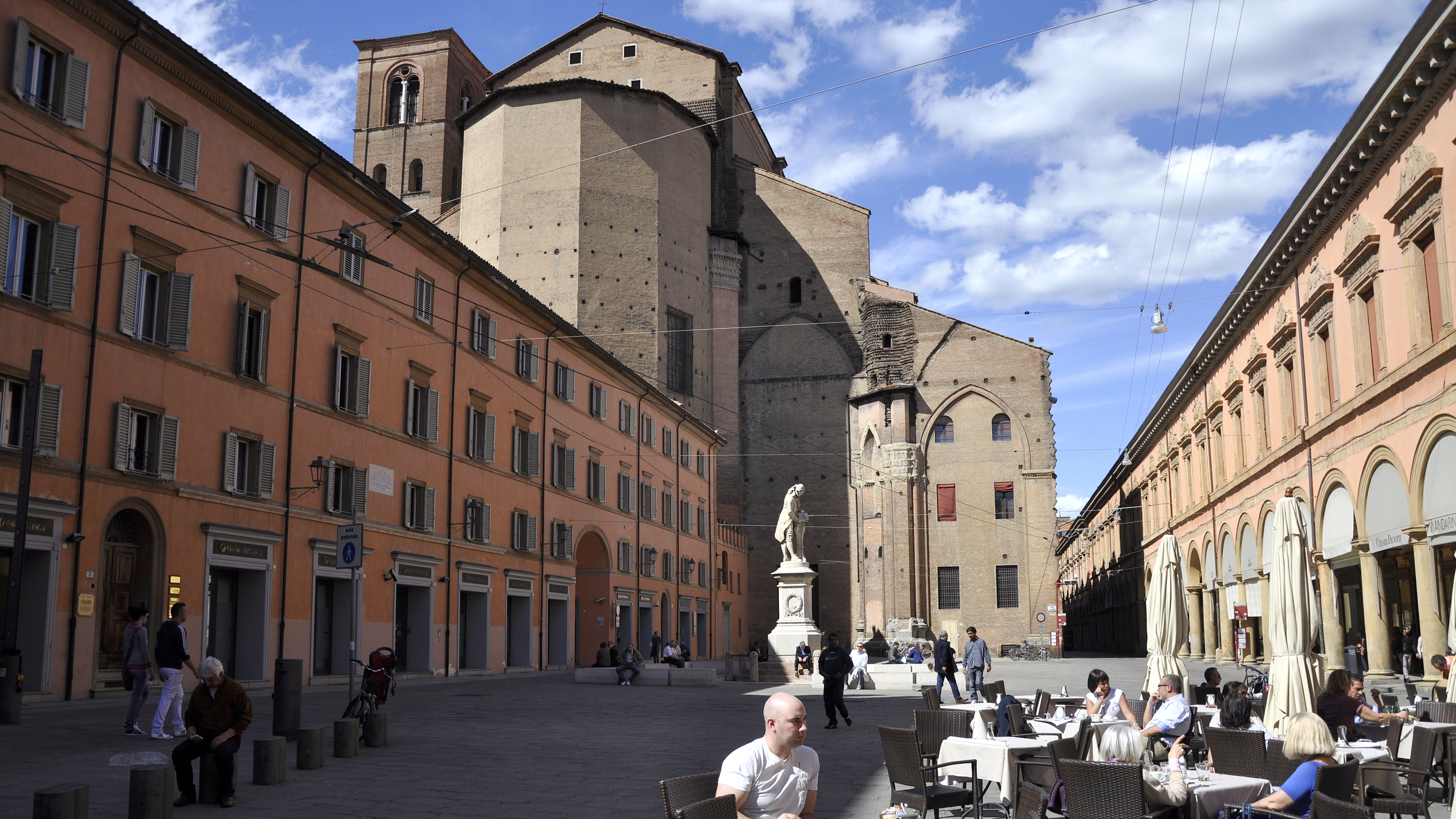
- View of the square in 2012
- Interactive map of Piazza Galvani
- Former name: Piazza della Pace (1801)
- Namesake: Luigi Galvani
- Location: Bologna, Italy
- Coordinates: 44°29′29.9″N 11°20′35.1″E
- North: Basilica of San Petronio; Via dell'Archiginnasio
- South: Via Farini

Construction
- Completion: c. 1563

Piazza Galvani is a square in the historic centre of Bologna named after the Italian physicist Luigi Galvani born in this city in 1737. A statue of the scientist adorns the centre of the squarewhich opens in the apse of the Basilica of San Petronio. The Archiginnasio Palace overlooks the square.

== History ==
Since 1449, the area where the square is today was used for the silk market, a production that characterised the Bolognese territory until the 17th century.

In 1563, with the construction of the Palazzo dell'Archiginnasio, the square was enlarged by Pope Pius IV and was originally called Piazza dell'Academia.

The square received various names, from Piazza dell'Archiginnasio to Piazza delle Scuole or del Paviglione, until it became Piazza della Pace in 1801, in honour of the peace treaty signed between French Republic and Emperor Francis II, and finally Piazza Galvani in 1871.

The statue is the work of the Italian sculptor Adalberto Cencetti.
