= San Michele in Bosco =

Religious complex in Bologna, central Italy

Coordinates: 44.481313°N 11.341796°E

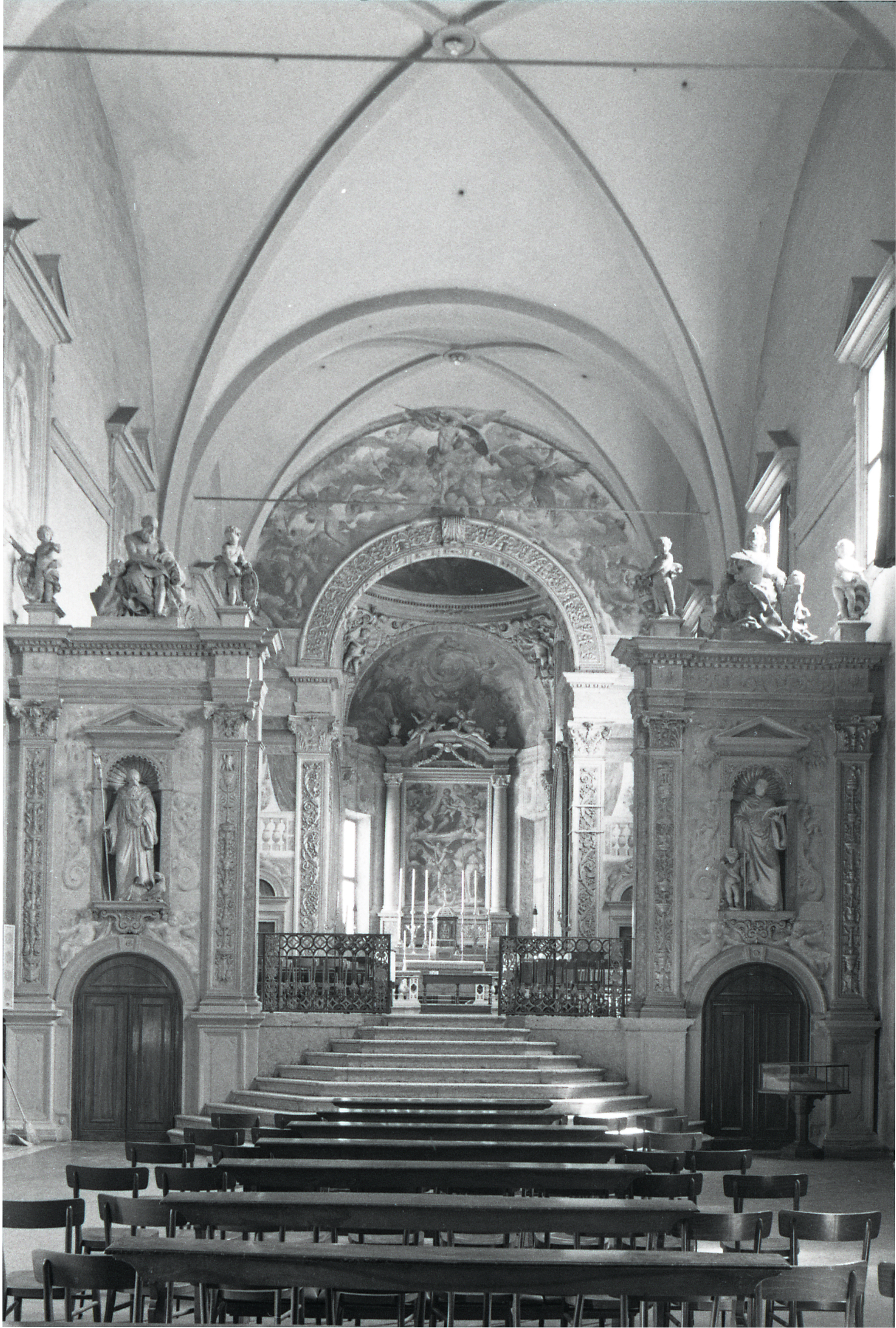
Interior of the church. Photo by Paolo Monti, 1973.

San Michele in Bosco is a religious complex in Bologna, central Italy, including the church with the same name and the annexed Olivetan monastery. The buildings of the monastery were acquired in 1955 by the municipality of Bologna, to house an orthopedic center named the Rizzoli Orthopedic Institute (l'Istituto Ortopedico Rizzoli).

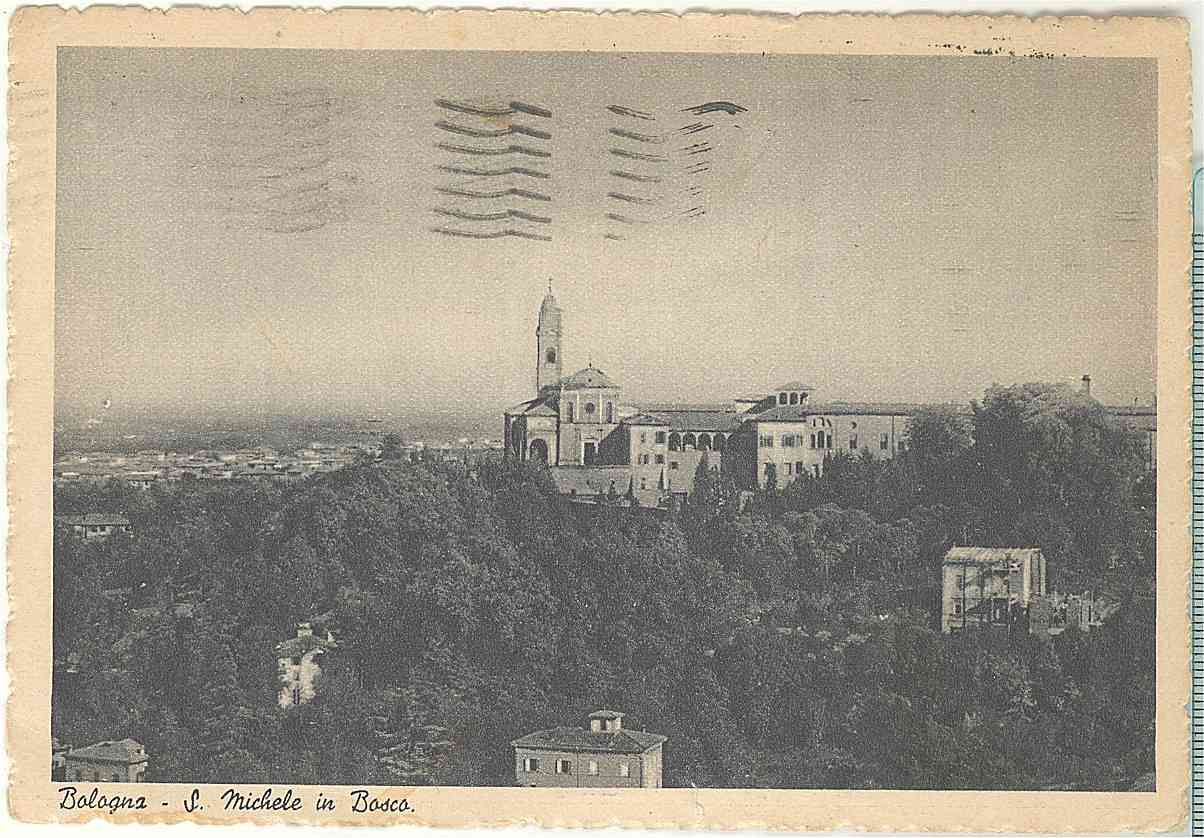
The complex in a 1954 postcard.

== Religious center ==
Located on a hill not far from the city's historical center, the area housed monastic structures as early as the 4th century AD. As was typical for shrines on remote sites or mountain tops, it was dedicated to the Archangel Michael. Tradition holds that the cenobitic community here was dispersed by the Goths in the early 5th century. After reforming, it was again destroyed by the Hungarian invasions of 906. Slowly recovering habitation, by 1107 it had begun to house Augustinian monks. Documents from 1120 and 1204 refer to this monastery.

Between 1348 and 1359, the combination of plague and the occupation of the town by the Visconti, depopulated the monastery. The site often became a fortress defending the town. Olivetan monks may have played a role in the monastery by the mid 14th-century, however the fortunes of the site were adverse. In the 1540s, it was partially occupied by Spanish armies of the Holy Roman Emperor. Only after almost two centuries of much neglect, in 1564 the papal legate Cardinal Androvino della Rocca, formally consigned the monastery to the order of Monte Oliveto. Over the next two centuries, the monastery flourished as a host a number of schools of learning and music.

The Asinelli Tower seen from one end of the long corridor of the monastery, appearing enlarged due to the effect of the Vista paradox.

The large complex was expropriated in 1797 during the Napoleonic occupation of the state. The monks were expelled and the structure was used as a barrack. In 1804, it was used as a prison ("house of strength") for those sentenced to life imprisonment. In 1838, Franciscan friars were brought to the site.

After the church was destroyed in 1430, they rebuilt it in different period, mostly finishing it by 1523. Gaspare Nadi was one of those who did work on it. The church has a Renaissance-style façade designed by Biagio Rossetti and his workshop. The marble portal (1521) was designed by Baldassarre Peruzzi, and sculpted by Giacomo da Ferrara and Bernardino da Lugano. The interior has a nave with four side chapels, and a presbytery.

The convent was finished in the late 16th century. It has an octagonal cloister, which was frescoed with the Lives of St Benedict and the protomartyrs Cecilia, Tiburzio and Valerian, interspersed with monochrome telamons, by Ludovico Carracci and his studio. Unfortunately, the works, made with oil on plaster technique, is now mostly fragments. However, engravings of the works proved influential.

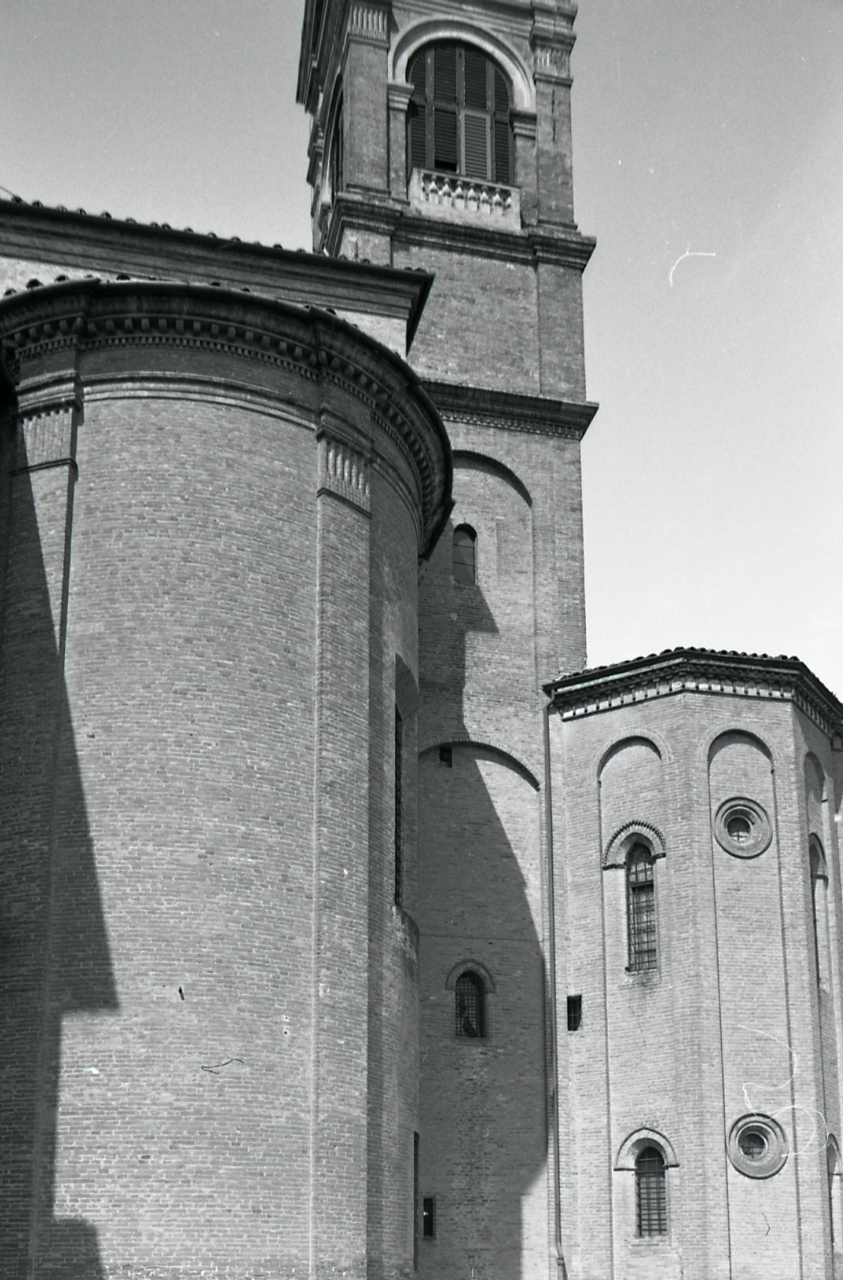
Detail of the rear of the church. Photo by Paolo Monti, 1973.

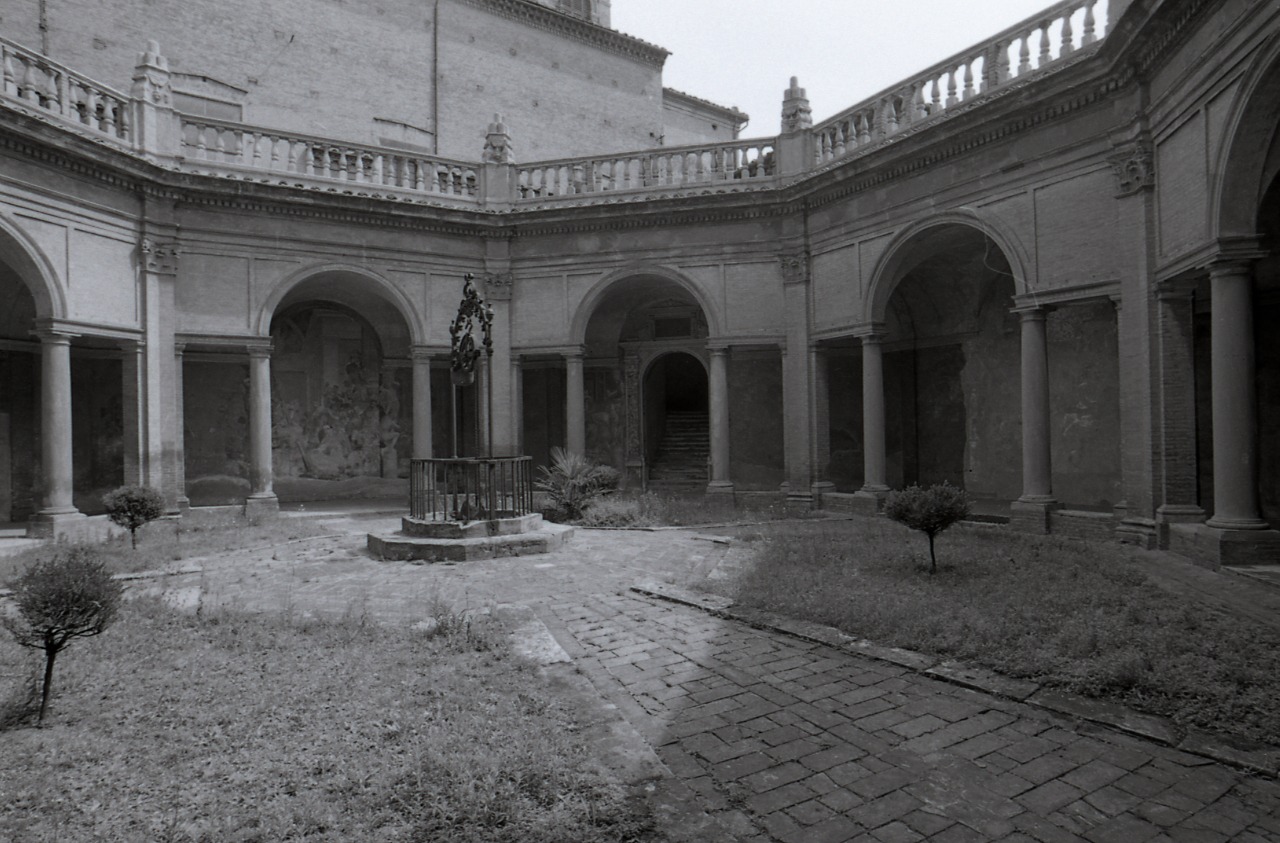
The octagonal cloister. Photo by Paolo Monti, 1971.

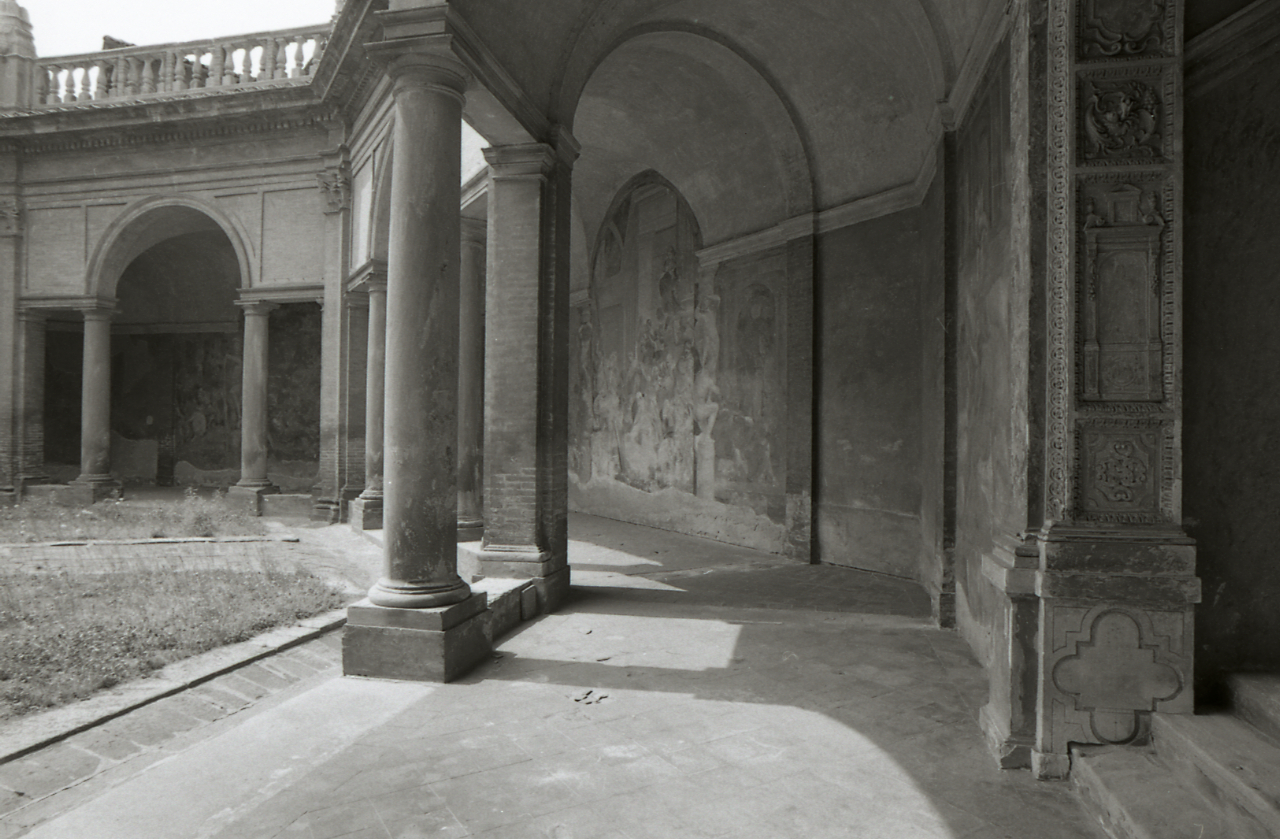
Frescos by Carracci in the cloister. Photo by Paolo Monti, 1971.

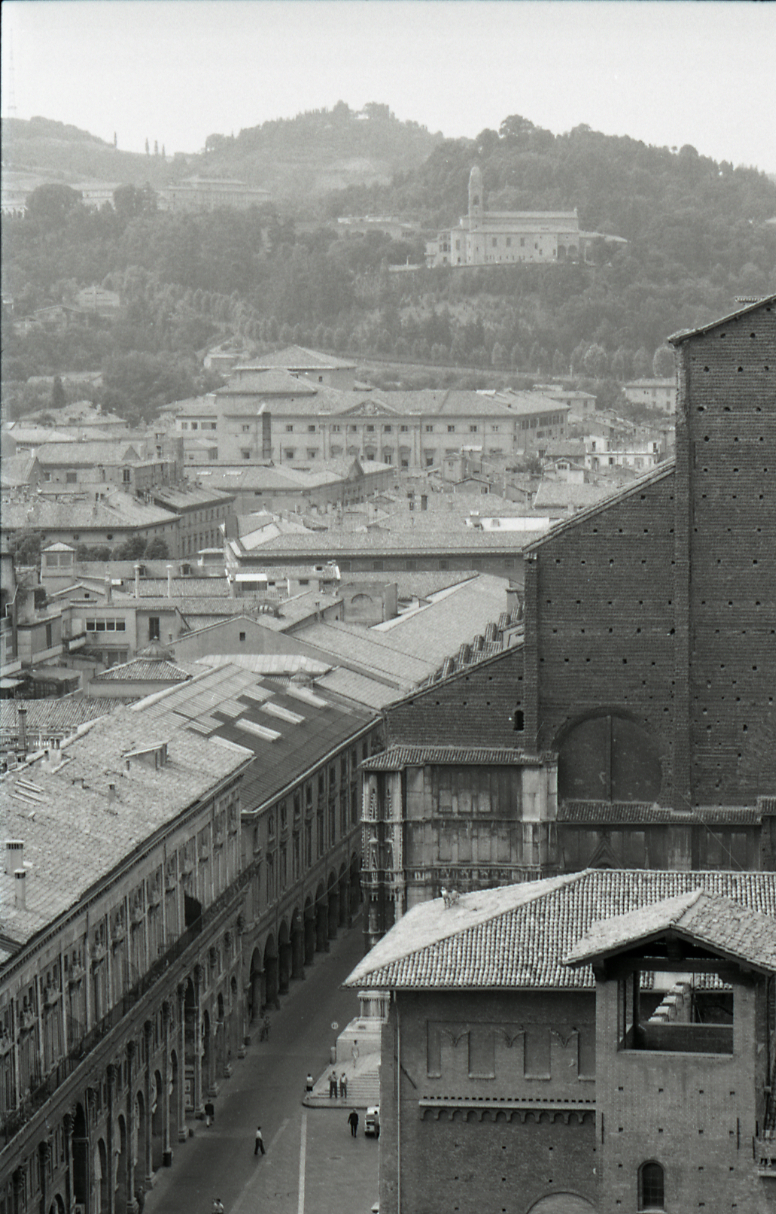
The complex seen from the center of Bologna. Photo by Paolo Monti, 1969.

== Orthopedic institute ==
The Rizzoli Orthopedic Institute was established using a bequest left by the orthopedic surgeon Francesco Rizzoli in 1880. With this hospital Rizzoli wanted to achieve both the advancement of science and the relief of suffering humanity. The institute was inaugurated by the King Umberto I of Italy on 28 June 1896 as the Rizzoli Orthopaedic Institute, and for in the next century was one of the best orthopedic hospitals in the world.

== Notes and references ==
Citations

Sources

- Bynum, W.F; Bynum, Helen (2007). Dictionary of medical biography. Vol. 4 (M-R). Westport, Connecticut - London: Greenwood Press.
- Il Monastero di San Michele in Bosco e l'Istituto Ortopedico Rizzoli. Bologna: Pendragon. 2006.
- Paltrinieri, A. (2006). Il Monastero di San Michele in Bosco e l'Istituto ortopedico Rizzoli. Edizioni Pendragon. ISBN 978-88-8342-517-2.
