= Teatro Nuovo (Mirandola) =

Opera house in Mirandola, Italy

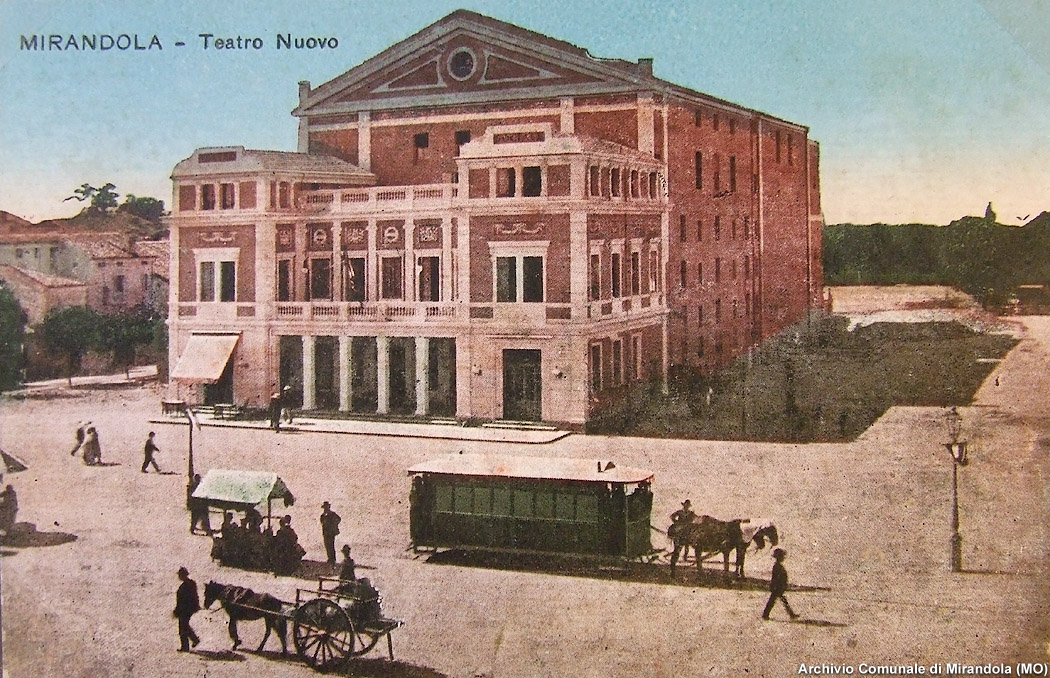
- The Teatro Nuovo in the early 20th century with the terminus of the horse tram.
- Interactive map of Teatro Nuovo
- Address: Piazza della Costituente, 7 Mirandola; Italy
- Coordinates: 44.888224°N 11.065421°E
- Owner: City of Mirandola
- Designation: theatre

Construction
- Opened: 1905
- Architect: Lorenzo Colliva

The Teatro Nuovo (New Theatre) is a theater located in Mirandola in the Italian province of Modena. Inaugurated in 1905, it replaced the old Teatro Greco, named after Count Ottavio Greco and built in 1791 inside the Castle of the Pico, which had ceased performances in 1894.

Designed by the Bolognese engineer Lorenzo Colliva, the new theater was largely inspired by the Teatro Storchi in Modena by the architect Vincenzo Maestri. At the time of its inauguration, the theater was equipped with a state-of-the-art electric lighting system, which powered a large retractable artistic chandelier in the ceiling. The theater was inaugurated on 16 September 1905 with a performance of Amilcare Ponchielli's opera La Gioconda.

Renovated extensively in 2005, the theater is still in use, and has hosted a variety of activities including performances of operas, musicals, plays, concerts of various types of music, art openings, film screenings, conferences and dance parties.

== Sources ==
- Sgarbanti e Mattioli, Itinerari illustrati e un po’ storici di Mirandola
- Mirandola: 30 secoli di storia Giuseppe Morselli
- Marta Lucchi, Musica e teatro a Mirandola nel settecento e ottocento
- Giulio Paltrinieri, I cento anni del Teatro Nuovo di Mirandola”-” L’inaugurazione”, Comune di Mirandola, 2005.
