= Voghera railway station =

Railway station in Italy

Voghera
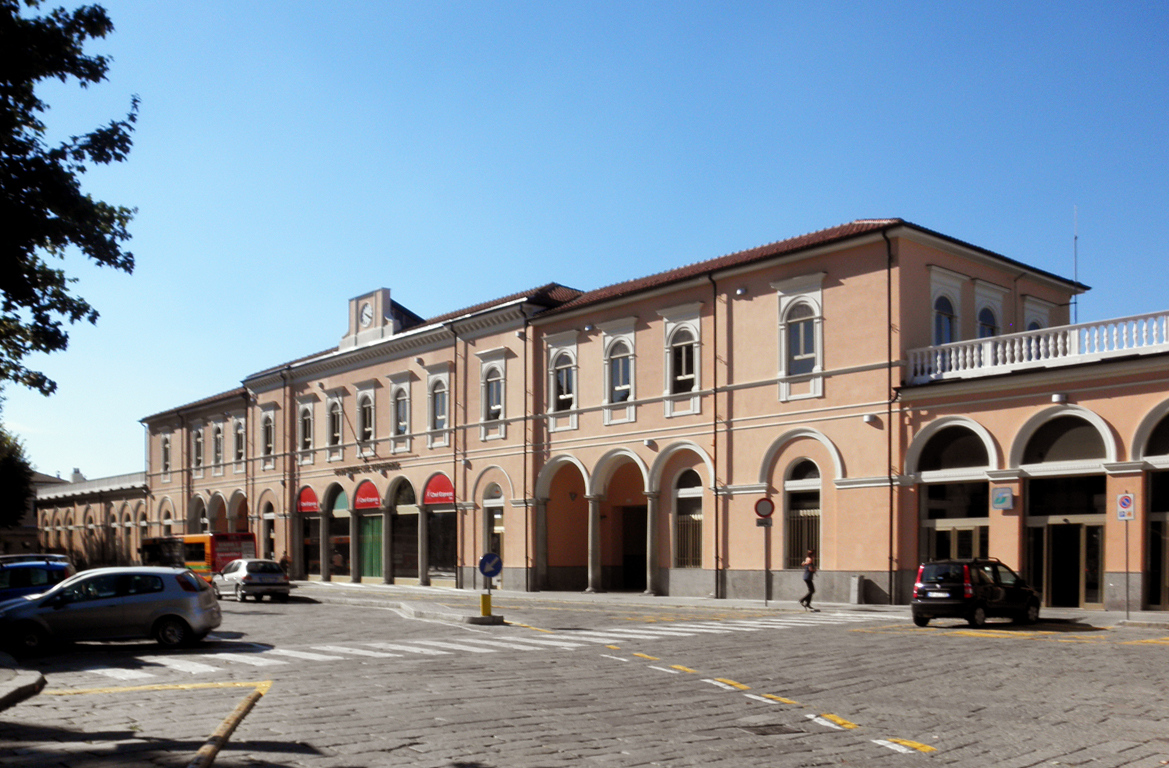
- The passenger building.ce

General information
- Location: Piazzale Guglielmo Marconi; 27058 Voghera PV; Voghera, Pavia, Lombardy; Italy
- Coordinates: 44°59′52″N 09°00′31″E
- Operator: Rete Ferroviaria Italiana; Centostazioni
- Lines: Milano–Pavia–Voghera; Alessandria–Piacenza
- Distance: 38.118 km (23.685 mi) from Alessandria
- Train operators: Trenitalia
- Connections: Urban and suburban buses

History
- Opened: 25 January 1858; 168 years ago
Location
- Location within Lombardy Location within Northern Italy Location within Italy

Voghera railway station (Italian: Stazione di Voghera) serves the town and comune of Voghera, in the region of Lombardy, northern Italy. Opened in 1858, it forms part of the Alessandria–Piacenza railway, and is also the terminus of a railway from Milan via Pavia.

The station is currently managed by Rete Ferroviaria Italiana (RFI). However, the commercial area of the passenger building is managed by Centostazioni. Train services are operated by Trenitalia. Each of these companies is a subsidiary of Ferrovie dello Stato (FS), Italy's state-owned rail company.

Due to its strategic position, the station is an important trading node, and one of the major railway stations in Italy's north-west.

== Location ==
Voghera railway station is situated at Piazzale Guglielmo Marconi, at the northern edge of the town centre.

== History ==
The station was opened on 25 January 1858, together with the rest of the Alessandria–Casteggio section of the Alessandria–Piacenza railway.

On 15 November 1867, the station became a junction station, upon the inauguration of the final, Alessandria–Voghera, section of the Milan–Pavia–Voghera railway.

On 31 May 1962, the station was the scene of a serious train crash, in which 63 people were killed and 40 injured.

== Features ==
=== Buildings ===
Inside the passenger building are the ticket office, waiting room, a bar operated by Chef Express, and most of the offices and rooms. The ticket office has a large plaque, placed in 1988, recalling the Vogherese rail workers who have fallen for freedom or on active service.

On the platform adjacent to track 1 are a newsstand and a retailer of tobacco products. Near the newsstand, a plaque unveiled on the 40th anniversary of the 1962 train crash recalls the tragedy.

In a lateral building on the Genoa side are the office of the railway police and the public conveniences. Other offices are located in another building, in the direction of Milan.

Yet another building once served as the accommodation for visiting rail crew.

=== Station yard ===
The station yard has seven tracks used for passenger service:

- Track 1: mainly for departing medium and long-distance trains (regional, InterCity and Eurostar City) to Torino Porta Nuova, as well as some trains to Alessandria;
- Track 2: mainly for medium and long-distance trains (regional, IC, Eurostar City) towards Piacenza. In addition to various towns in Emilia, other termini for trains departing from here are Rimini, Ancona, Bari Centrale and Lecce;
- Track 3: for regional transport: destinations are predominantly Milan and Asti;
- Track 4: for almost all departing trains heading towards Genoa. Other destinations are Ventimiglia, Albenga, La Spezia Centrale, Livorno Centrale, Nice, Novi Ligure, Arquata Scrivia, Grosseto;
- Track 5: for InterCity and regional trains heading towards Milan. Some Eurocity trains proceed beyond the Lombardian capital, to reach Zürich Hauptbahnhof and Schaffhausen in Switzerland;
- Tracks 6 and 7: for regional transportation to and from Milan (Voghera terminus). Other Milanese stations reached by these trains are Milano Centrale, Milano Porta Garibaldi and Milano Greco Pirelli. A regional train departs from here for Sesto San Giovanni, and a train operates with limited stops to Milano Lambrate.
- Dock platform: faces in an easterly direction, and used occasionally for regional trains to Piacenza.

A platform adjacent to the passenger building is used to provide access to track 1. To serve the other tracks, there are three island platforms, all of them linked with the passenger building via three pedestrian underpasses.

The island platforms serving tracks 2/3 and 4/5 have full length canopies; the other island platform, which serves tracks 6/7, has no shelter.

There are also other tracks, used only by goods trains.

== Train services ==
The station has about 4.5 million passenger movements each year. It is used mainly by commuters, travelling for work or study to and from the cities of Milan and Pavia. However, as an intersection of two major travel routes, it is also frequently used for changing trains.

The station is served by the following service(s):

- EuroCity services Marseille - Cannes - Nice - Monaco - Ventimiglia - Genoa - Milan

== Interchange ==
In the square outside the station is a bus stop for urban routes operated by the town of Voghera.

In the immediate vicinity of the railway station is the suburban bus station, as well as a multi-transport facility. Both are reached from the station's eastern pedestrian underpass, which is longer than the other two underpasses.

== Gallery ==
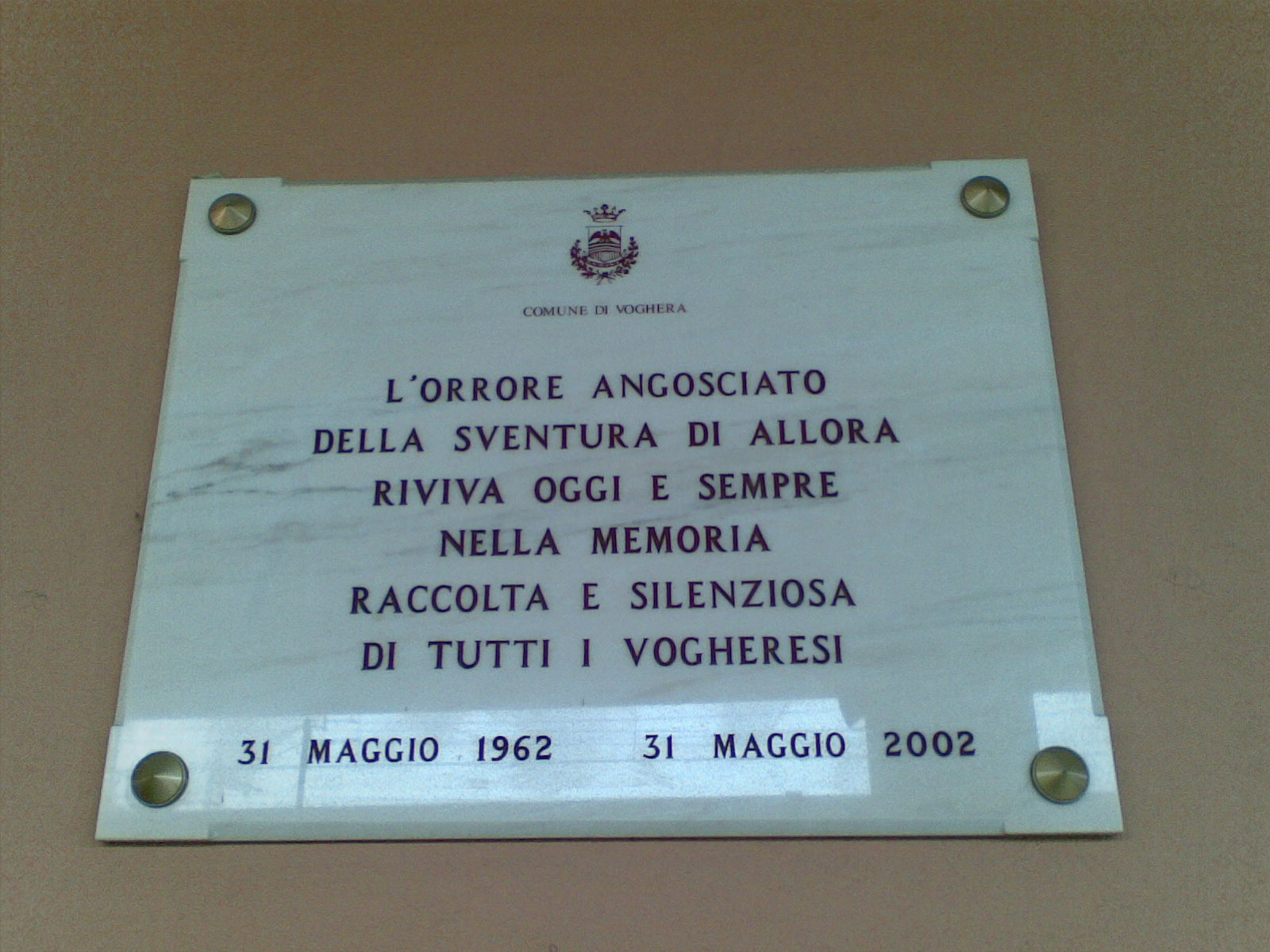
Plaque on the platform 1 commemorating the incident of 31 May 1962

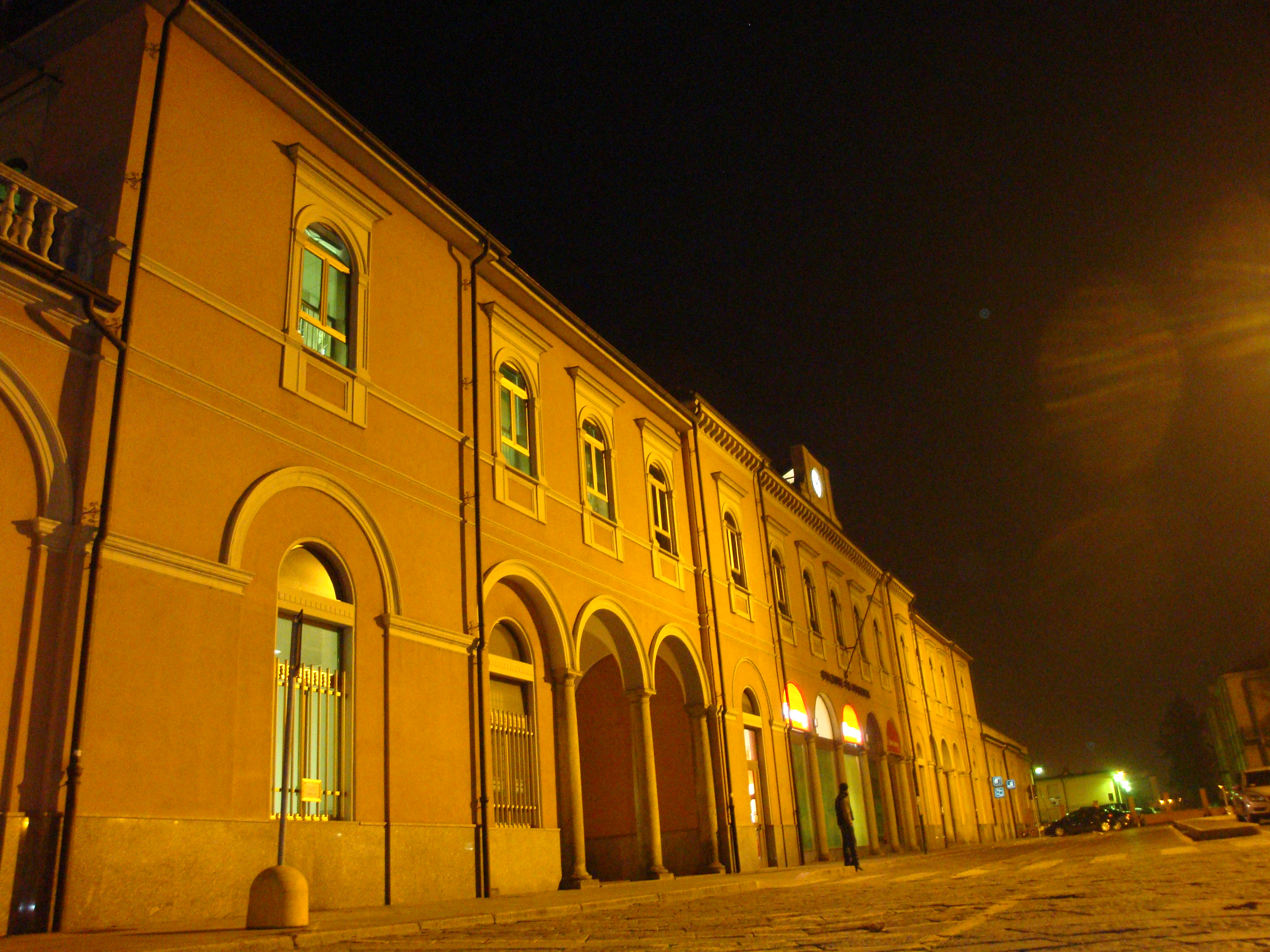
The passenger building, 20 November 2008

== See also ==
- History of rail transport in Italy
- List of railway stations in Lombardy
- Rail transport in Italy
- Railway stations in Italy
