= Corbetta–Santo Stefano Ticino railway station =

Railway station in Italy

Corbetta–S.Stefano Ticino
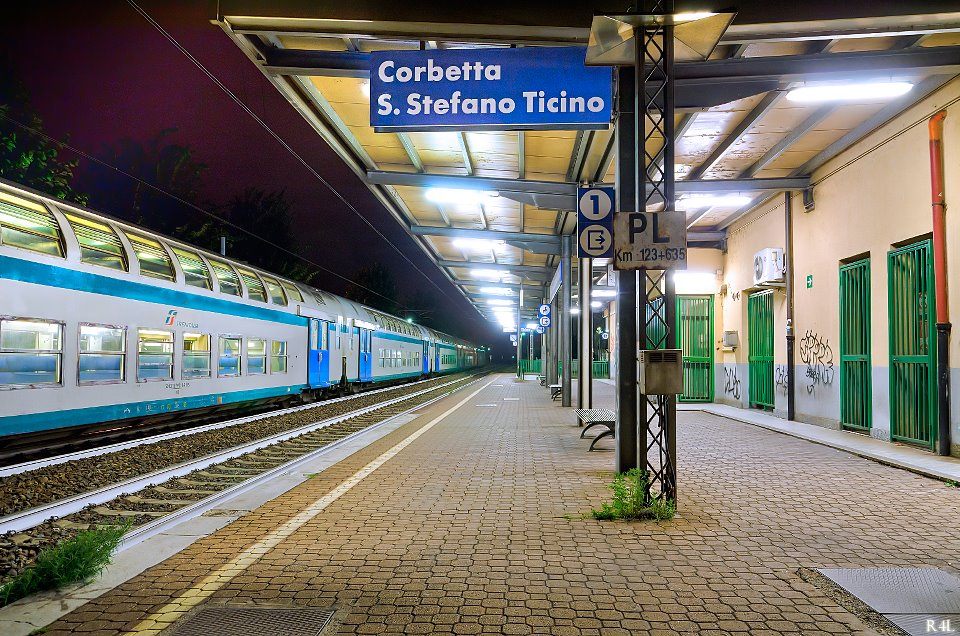

General information
- Location: Corbetta border Santo Stefano Ticino, Milan, Lombardy; Italy
- Coordinates: 45°28′53″N 08°55′05″E
- Operator: Rete Ferroviaria Italiana
- Line: Turin–Milan
- Distance: 123.688 km (76.856 mi) from Torino Porta Nuova
- Platforms: 2
- Tracks: 2
- Train operators: Trenord

Other information
- Fare zone: STIBM: Mi6
- Classification: Bronze

History
- Opened: 7 January 1936; 90 years ago

Services
Preceding station	Trenord	Following station
Magenta towards Novara	Line S6 (Milan suburban railway service)	Vittuone–Arluno towards Treviglio
Location
- Location within Lombardy Location within Northern Italy Location within Italy

Corbetta-Santo Stefano Ticino railway station is a railway station in Italy. Located on the Turin–Milan railway, it serves the municipality of Santo Stefano Ticino. The train services are operated by Trenord.

== Train services ==
The station is served by the following service(s):

- Milan Metropolitan services (S6) Novara - Rho - Milan - Treviglio

== See also ==
- Milan suburban railway network
