= Vittuone–Arluno railway station =

Railway station in Italy

Vittuone–Arluno
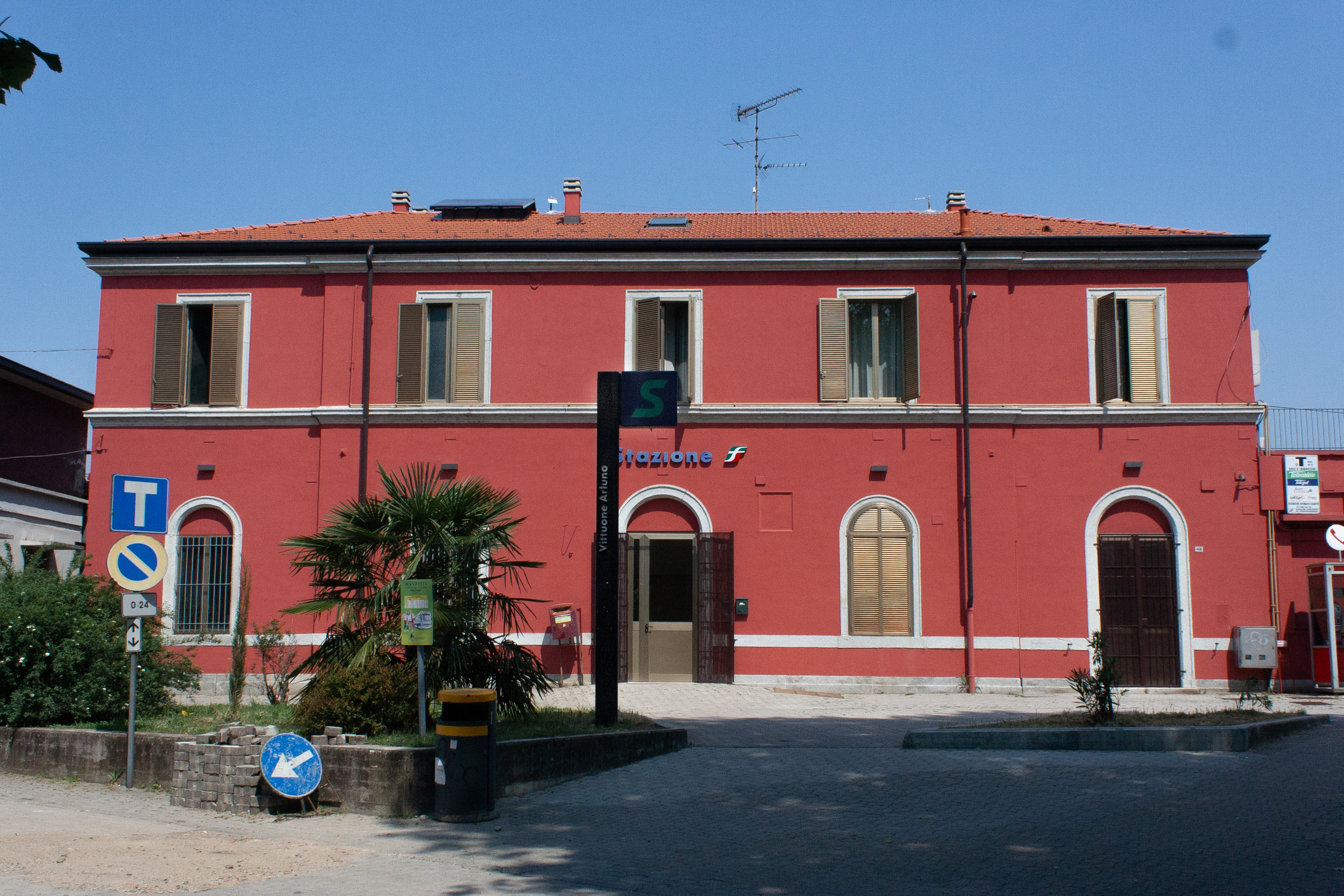

General information
- Location: Arluno border Vittuone, Milan, Lombardy; Italy
- Coordinates: 45°29′27″N 08°56′50″E
- Operator: Rete Ferroviaria Italiana
- Line: Turin–Milan
- Distance: 126.206 km (78.421 mi) from Torino Porta Nuova
- Platforms: 2
- Tracks: 2
- Train operators: Trenord

Other information
- Fare zone: STIBM: Mi5
- Classification: Bronze

History
- Opened: 18 October 1858; 167 years ago

Services
Preceding station	Trenord	Following station
Corbetta–Santo Stefano Ticino towards Novara	Line S6 (Milan suburban railway service)	Pregnana Milanese towards Treviglio
Location
- Location within Lombardy Location within Northern Italy Location within Italy

Vittuone–Arluno railway station is a railway station in Italy. Located on the Turin–Milan railway, it serves the municipality of Vittuone. The train services are operated by Trenord.

== Train services ==
The station is served by the following service(s):

- Milan Metropolitan services (S6) Novara – Rho – Milan – Treviglio

== See also ==
- Milan suburban railway network
