= Pregnana Milanese railway station =

Railway station in Italy

Pregnana Milanese

General information
- Location: Via della Liberazione; Pregnana Milanese, Milan, Lombardy; Italy
- Coordinates: 45°30′36″N 09°00′10″E
- Operator: Rete Ferroviaria Italiana
- Line: Turin–Milan
- Distance: 131.037 km (81.423 mi) from Torino Porta Nuova
- Platforms: 2
- Tracks: 2
- Train operators: Trenord

Other information
- Fare zone: STIBM: Mi5
- Classification: Bronze

History
- Opened: 14 June 2009; 17 years ago

Services
Preceding station	Trenord	Following station
Vittuone–Arluno towards Novara	Line S6 (Milan suburban railway service)	Rho towards Treviglio
Location
- Location within Lombardy Location within Northern Italy Location within Italy

Pregnana Milanese railway station is a railway station in Italy. Located on the Turin–Milan railway, it serves the municipality of Pregnana Milanese. The train services are operated by Trenord.

== Train services ==
The station is served by the following service(s):

- Milan Metropolitan services (S6) Novara - Rho - Milan - Treviglio, with trains every 30 minutes per direction

== See also ==
- Milan suburban railway network
