= Trecate railway station =

Railway station in Italy

Trecate
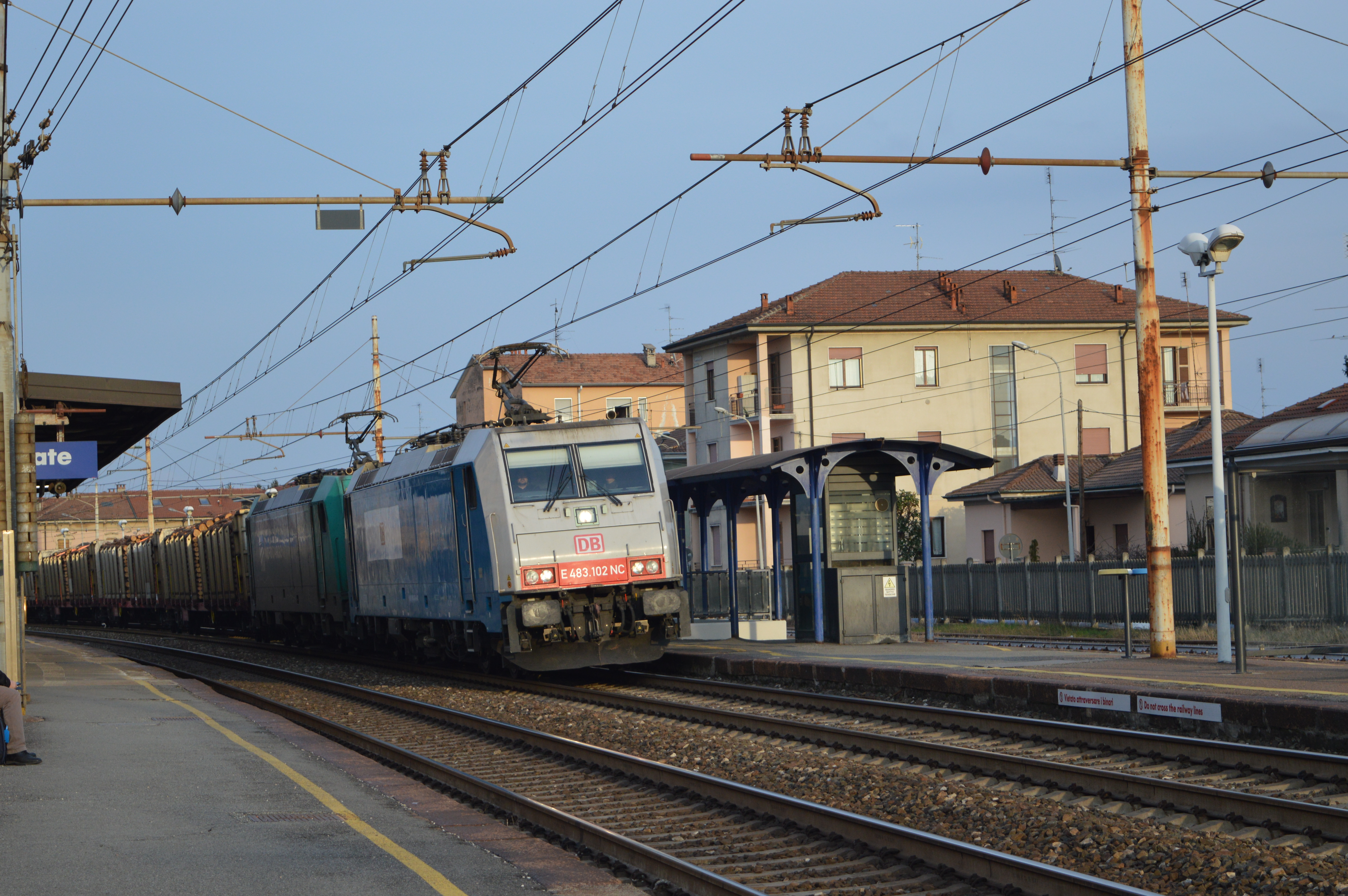

General information
- Location: Piazza Marconi 5 Trecate, Novara, Piedmont; Italy
- Coordinates: 45°25′43″N 08°44′22″E
- Operator: Rete Ferroviaria Italiana
- Line: Turin–Milan
- Distance: 108.464 km (67.396 mi) from Torino Porta Nuova
- Platforms: 2
- Tracks: 2
- Train operators: Trenord

Other information
- Classification: silver

Services
Preceding station	Trenord	Following station
Novara Terminus	Line S6 (Milan suburban railway service)	Magenta towards Treviglio
Location
- Location within Lombardy Location within Northern Italy Location within Italy

Trecate railway station is a railway station in Italy. Located on the Turin–Milan railway, it serves the municipality of Trecate in Piedmont, even if it is part of the Lombardy railway system. The train services are operated by Trenord.

== Train services ==
The station is served by the following service(s):

- Milan Metropolitan services (S6) Novara - Rho - Milan - Treviglio

== See also ==
- Milan suburban railway network
