= Marengo–Mandrogne Tramway =

Tramway in Piedmont, Italy, 1882–1933

Marengo–Mandrogne tramway

Overview
- Termini: Spinetta Marengo; Mandrogne

Service
- Type: Interurban tramway
- Operator: S.A. delle Tramvie a Vapore della Provincia di Alessandria (1898–1933)

History
- Closed: 1933

Technical
- Line length: 8.650 km
- Track gauge: 1,445 mm (4 ft 8 7/8 in)

The Marengo–Mandrogne tramway was an interurban tram line that connected the localities of Marengo and Mandrogne from 1882 to 1933. The junction station at Marengo was shared with the tramway to Sale; after crossing the Alessandria–Piacenza railway, the line served the localities of Spinetta, Bettale, Litta Parodi and Cascinagrossa before reaching the terminus at Mandrogne.

== History ==
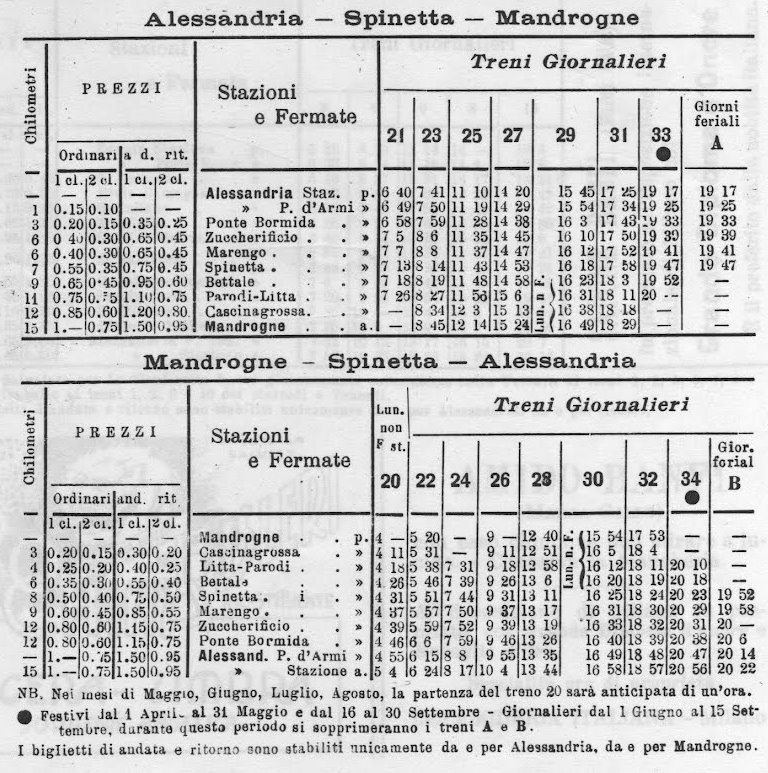
Timetable of the Alessandria–Mandrogne tramway

The line was born as a branch, requested by several influential residents of Mandrogne and Cascinagrossa, of the Alessandria-Sale tramway. Ministerial authorization for the construction of a mechanically powered tramway was granted in early 1881, to cavalier Domenico Bellisomi, who had built, together with Ercole Belloli, the Alessandria–Casale and Alessandria–Sale tramways. Bellisomi obtained the Prefect's agreement in 1882.

On 13 April 1882, Bellisomi transferred the concession to the firm Geisser & C. of Turin, as payment for a debt contracted by Bellisomi towards the latter company. Two years later the city of Alessandria began a dispute with the Geisser firm that lasted until 1888, when the municipality took over the line. On 17 September 1888, a new nine-year (renewable) agreement was signed with Angelo Bello of Spinetta to operate the line with horse traction.

Relations between Bello and the municipality of Alessandria were tense, as the concessionaire of the tramway continually requested increases in the annual subsidy, which rose from 500 to 1250 lire between 1889 and 1892. In 1896 the municipality of Alessandria presented to the Belgian Società Anonima delle Tramvie a Vapore della Provincia di Alessandria, which had operated the Alessandria–Casale and Alessandria–Sale tramways since 1881, a draft agreement for the operation of the Marengo–Mandrogne tramway with steam traction; the only issue to overcome was the crossing of the Alessandria–Piacenza railway at Spinetta. Once the railway crossing problem was solved, the agreement was signed on 29 January 1898, and the line was inaugurated on the following 2 October.

Over time, the line, like the other sections operated by the "Belgian" company, was no longer able to satisfy the needs of the local population, offering an increasingly poor service. The line closed on 7 November 1933, replaced by buses of the Società Autotrasporti Alessandria (SAA); the short section between the Spinetta Marengo sugar refinery and Spinetta station remained in service as a freight spur until the 1950s. The remaining section of the line was dismantled from 1936 onward.

== Characteristics ==
The tramway was a single-track line with standard gauge of 1445 mm, entirely on reserved track (mixed with road traffic). It extended for 8.650 km. The minimum curve radius was 30 metres, and the maximum gradient was 12 per thousand. Trains could reach a maximum speed of 20 km/h.

== Rolling stock ==
The rolling stock of the "Belgian" company, used interchangeably on all its lines, comprised, between 1927 and 1930, twelve steam locomotives, 31 two-axle trailers, and 70 freight wagons.

== See also ==
- List of tram and light rail transit systems
- History of rail transport in Italy
- Alessandria-Sale tramway
- Alessandria-Casale Monferrato tramway

== Bibliography ==
- Ogliari, Francesco; Sapi, Franco (1968). Scintille tra i monti. Storia dei trasporti italiani [Sparks among the mountains. History of Italian transport] (in Italian). Vol. 8 e 9. Piemonte-Valle d'Aosta. Milan.
- Messina, Orazio; Ricci, Valentino; Gandini, Marco (1998). Storia dei trasporti alessandrini [History of transport in Alessandria] (PDF) (in Italian). Alessandria: SOGED-ATM. Archived from the original (PDF) on 26 March 2014.
