= Napoleon's plane tree =

Notable monumental tree in Italy

- Napoleon's plane tree
- Interactive map of Napoleon's plane tree
- Species: London plane (Platanus × hispanica)
- Location: Alessandria, Piedmont, Italy
- Height: 37 m (121 ft)
- Girth: 7.6 m (25 ft)

Napoleon's plane tree (Italian: Platano di Napoleone) is a notable monumental tree and one of the largest trees in northwestern Italy. It is also recognized as one of the Luoghi del Cuore (Places of the Heart) by the Fondo Ambiente Italiano (FAI). The tree stands at kilometre 96 of the former State Road 10, now Via Marengo, on the boundary between the city of Alessandria and its hamlet of Spinetta Marengo, in Piedmont, Italy.

== History ==
Detail of the trunk of Napoleon's plane tree

According to legend, Napoleon Bonaparte rested beneath the branches of this tree following his victory at the Battle of Marengo in 1800. However, a careful historical analysis suggests that this account is unlikely, as the plane tree would have stood immediately adjacent to the Austrian lines. More plausibly, several plane trees were planted along the road by order of the Corsican general to commemorate the soldiers killed on both sides. The planting also served strategic purposes: Napoleon's arrival led to the demolition of walls and bastions, opening the city to the surrounding countryside. On the orders of the future emperor, the roads were lined with plane trees or Lombardy poplars to make their routes clearly distinguishable.

At the beginning of the 20th century, five of the plane trees planted around 1807 were still standing along the road to Spinetta Marengo. Two of these were subsequently felled during the construction of a new bridge, leaving only three: two confined between wire fences and the guardrail at the end of the bridge, and the monumental specimen, standing at the edge of a field.

Napoleon's plane tree is included in the official Italian register of monumental trees, under identification number 001/A182/AL/01.

== Description ==
Standing beside a road that was once unpaved but is now asphalted, the plane tree has seen its available growing space gradually diminish over the course of its life. This has caused it to grow towards the fields behind it, with its enormous trunk dividing into four main branches that rise to form a broad, sail-shaped crown, giving the tree an undulating appearance. With a trunk circumference of approximately 7.6 metres, its height has decreased over the past twenty years from 40 metres to just 36 metres. Despite its estimated age of more than 200 years and its relatively exposed position, Napoleon's plane tree shows no signs of damage caused by adverse weather conditions or pests, and displays good vegetative vigour together with reassuring structural stability.

Originally classified as Platanus orientalis following examinations carried out by the State Forestry Corps during the 1980s, a more detailed analysis subsequently identified the tree as Platanus × hispanica, with a predominance of characteristics inherited from its American parent species, particularly evident in the size of its achenes.

== See also ==
- List of individual trees

== Bibliography ==
- Kanceff, Emanuele, ed. (1998). La cultura francese nell'alessandrino: congresso del venticinquennale (1969-1994) della Società italiana dei francesisti (in Italian). Moncalieri: C.I.R.VI. ISBN 9788877603050.
- Istituto per le Piante da Legno e l'Ambiente (IPLA); Università degli studi di Torino, eds. (2008). Alberi monumentali del Piemonte (in Italian). Savigliano: L'Artistica. ISBN 9788873201977.
