= Voghera =

- Comune
- Città di Voghera
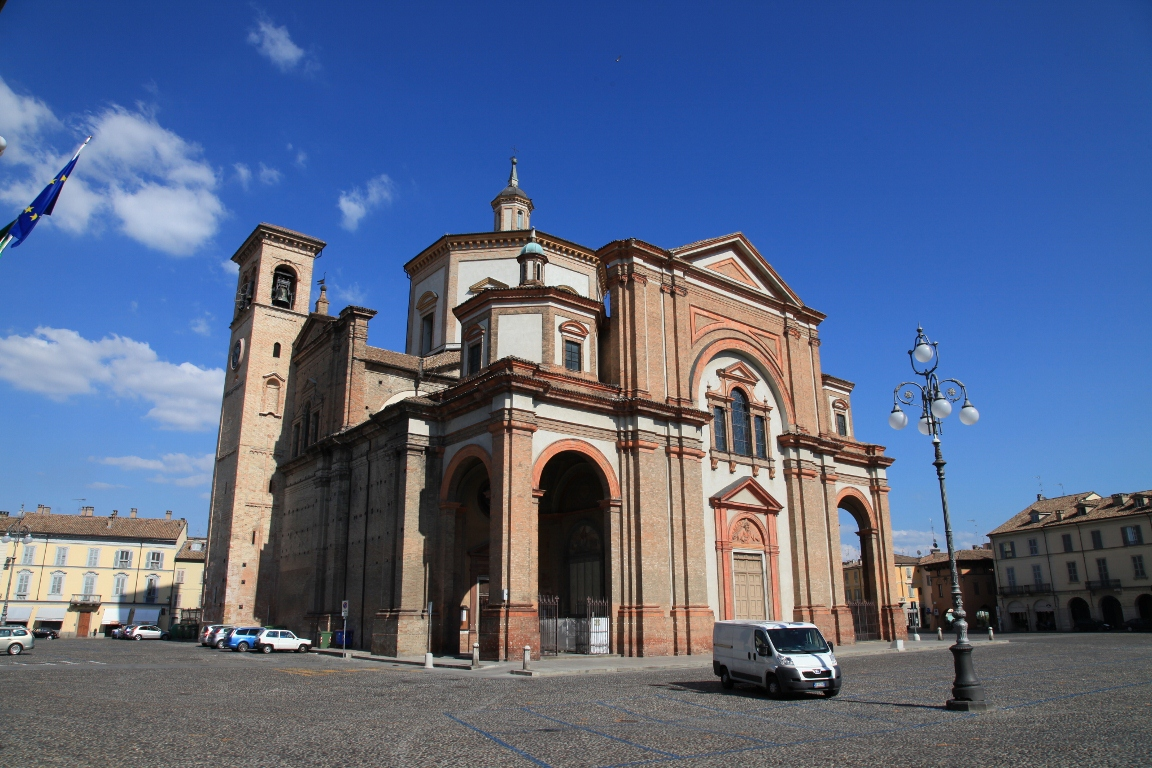
- The Cathedral of Voghera.

- Flag Coat of arms

- Voghera within the Province of Pavia

- Location within Italy Location within Lombardy
- Coordinates: 44°59′33″N 09°00′33″E
- Country: Italy
- Region: Lombardy
- Province: Pavia (PV)
- Frazioni: Medassino, Oriolo, Valle, Torremenapace, Campoferro

Government
  - Mayor: Paola Garlaschelli

Area
  - Total: 63 km^{2} (24 sq mi)
- Elevation: 96 m (315 ft)

Population (28 February 2022)
  - Total: 38,464
  - Density: 610/km^{2} (1,600/sq mi)
- Demonym: Vogheresi or Iriensi
- Time zone: UTC+1 (CET)
  - Summer (DST): UTC+2 (CEST)
- Postal code: 27058
- Dialing code: 0383
- Patron saint: Saint Bovo
- Saint day: First Friday before Ascension
- Website: Official website

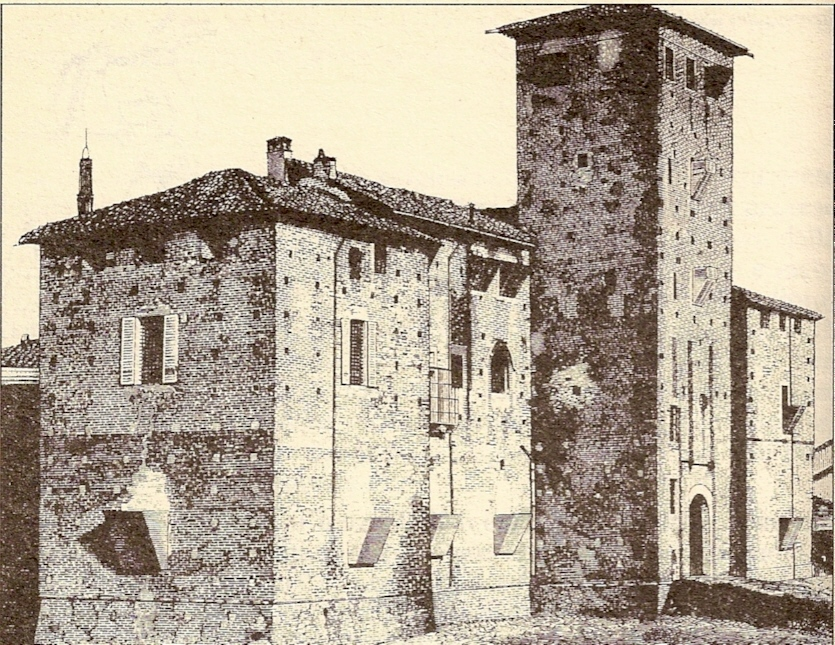
The Castle of Voghera in a 19th-century etching.

Voghera (Vogherese dialect of Emilian: Vughera; Latin: Forum Iulii Iriensium) is a town and comune in the Province of Pavia in the Italian region Lombardy. The population was 39,374 as of 2017. It is the third most populated town in the province, after Pavia and Vigevano. It is located 30 km south-southwest of that city, on the Staffora (a tributary of the Po).

It is the main town of Oltrepò Pavese and is an important rail and road hub as well as a renowned wine producer.

== History ==
Known in ancient times as Iria, the town took its name from the river on which it was situated. It was on the road from Piacenza to Dertona, and was made a colony by Augustus (colonia Forum Iulium Iriensium).

In the 1st century CE, it was destroyed by the Rugii, and it is next mentioned as Viqueria (contracted from vicus Iriae, Iria's village) in the 10th century. After several lordships, it was acquired by the House of Savoy in 1743 with the Treaty of Worms. Five years later it became the provincial capital and received the city status.

In 1800, the troops of Napoleon occupied the town and set his headquarters in the Palazzo Dattili for the battle of Montebello. In 1805 it became part of the département of Genoa; after the French defeat in 1814, it was captured by the Austrians, who handed it over to the Piedmontese. In 1860 it was included in the province of Pavia.

During World War II, the town was heavily bombed by the Allies because of its strategic position on the roads Milan-Genoa and Turin-Bologna.

On May 31, 1962, it was the location of a railway disaster that killed 62 people.

== Main sights ==
- The Castle, erected by the Visconti in 1335–1372, containing frescoes attributed to Bramantino.
- Palazzo Gounela, the current Town Hall.
- The large Cathedral of Saint Lawrence dates from the 11th century, but was remodelled in the Baroque style about the beginning of the 17th.
- The church of St. Joseph, with a noteworthy Baroque façade.
- The suppressed church of Sant'Ilario, also known as Tempio alla Cavalleria or Chiesa Rossa ("Cavalry Temple" or "Red Church"), so-called from the red colour of the brick of which it is built. It dates from the 8th–10th centuries.
- Cowboyland - Only Western theme-park in Italy

The Historic Museum houses, among the others, the personal A112 car of General Carlo Alberto Dalla Chiesa, killed by the Mafia in 1982, and the weapon that allegedly killed Benito Mussolini.

== Transport ==
Voghera railway station, opened in 1858, forms part of the Alessandria–Piacenza railway, and is also an important node of the railway from Milan to Genoa. Due to its strategic position, the station is an important trading node, and one of the major railway stations in Italy's north-west.

== Popular culture and media ==
The term "Voghera housewife" (casalinga di Voghera) is often used in the media, political discourse and even in common parlance as a reference to the average, stereotypical, somewhat lower-middle-class person, voter or consumer. It is not a disparaging term but refers to an average person who – despite not being very educated or sophisticated – with hard work and self-sacrifice is trying to raise a family as best as possible.

== People ==
- Nora Orlandi, pianist, violinist, soprano vocalist, composer, and occasional actress.
- Alberto Arbasino, writer
- Sandro Bolchi, cinema director
- Ambrogio Casati, painter
- Valentino Garavani, fashion designer, known as Valentino
- Attilio Gatti, explorer in Africa, author (b. in Voghera 1896)
- Aldo Giorgini, computer art pioneer
- Carolina Invernizio, writer
- Alessandro Maragliano, writer
- Maserati Brothers, automobile engineers
- Antonio Natali, politician
- Mauro Nespoli, archer
- Giovanni Parisi, boxer
- Giovanni Plana, astronomer, mathematician
- Federico Sandi, motorcycle racer
- Luigi Montagna, better known as Bull Montana, professional wrestler and actor
- Fabrizio Poggi, Grammy-nominated blues harmonica player
- Francesco Luigi Verta, politician and ambassador in Malta

== Twin cities ==
- Manosque, France
- Leinfelden-Echterdingen, Germany
- Cheyenne, United States

== See also ==
- Oltrepò Pavese
