= Vercelli railway station =

Railway station in Vercelli, Italy

Vercelli
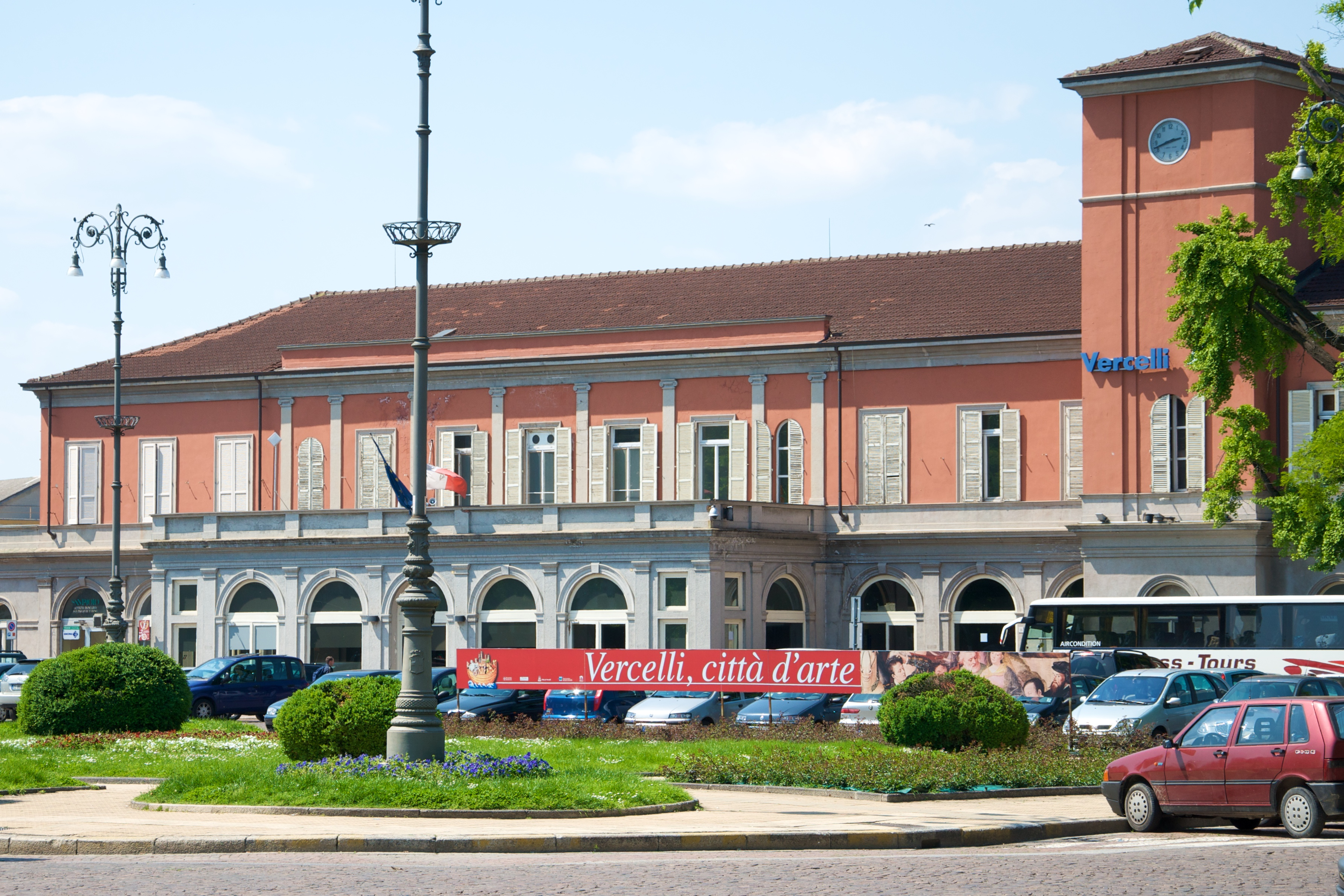
- The passenger building.

General information
- Location: Piazza Roma; 13100 Vercelli VC; Vercelli, Vercelli, Piedmont; Italy
- Coordinates: 45°19′47″N 08°24′59″E
- Operator: Rete Ferroviaria Italiana; Centostazioni
- Lines: Turin–Milan; Vercelli–Valenza; Vercelli–Pavia
- Distance: 77.054 km (47.879 mi) from Torino Porta Nuova
- Train operators: Trenitalia
- Connections: Urban and suburban buses

Other information
- Classification: Gold

History
- Opened: 20 October 1856; 169 years ago
Location
- Location within Piedmont Location within Northern Italy Location within Italy

Vercelli railway station (Italian: Stazione di Vercelli) is the main station serving the city and comune of Vercelli, in the Piedmont region, northwestern Italy. Opened in 1856, it forms part of the Turin–Milan railway, and is also a junction station for two other lines, to Valenza and Pavia, respectively.

The station is currently managed by Rete Ferroviaria Italiana (RFI). However, the commercial area of the passenger building is managed by Centostazioni. Train services are operated by Trenitalia. Each of these companies is a subsidiary of Ferrovie dello Stato (FS), Italy's state-owned rail company.

== Location ==
Vercelli railway station is situated at Piazza Roma, at the northwestern edge of the city centre.

== History ==
The station was opened on 20 October 1856, upon the opening of the Torino Porta Susa–Novara section of the Turin–Milan railway.

== Features ==
The passenger building is made up of three components: the central part has two levels and a large lobby consisting of five arches. The single storey lateral wings spread symmetrically from the central part, and are smaller. The building is made of brick. It is painted grey at ground floor level, and a rose colour above that level.

== Train services ==
The station is served by the following services:

- High speed services (Frecciabianca) Turin - Milan - Brescia - Verona - Vicenza - Padua - Venice - Trieste
- Night train (Intercity Notte) Turin - Milan - Parma - Rome - Naples - Salerno
- Night train (Intercity Notte) Turin - Milan - Parma - Reggio Emilia - Florence - Rome - Salerno - Lamezia Terme - Reggio di Calabria
- Express services (Regionale Veloce) Turin - Chivasso – Vercelli – Novara – Milan
- Regional services (Treno regionale) Chivasso - Vercelli - Novara
- Regional services (Treno regionale) Vercelli - Mortara - Pavia

Train services to Casale Monferrato finished on 14 June 2013.

== Passenger and train movements ==
The station has around 3.5 million passenger movements each year. There are about 138 trains per day.

The trains stopping at Vercelli are Frecciabianca, Intercity Notte and regional trains. Their main destinations are Novara, Turin and Milan.

== See also ==
- History of rail transport in Italy
- List of railway stations in Piedmont
- Rail transport in Italy
- Railway stations in Italy
