= Alessandria railway station =

Railway station in Alessandria, Italy

Alessandria
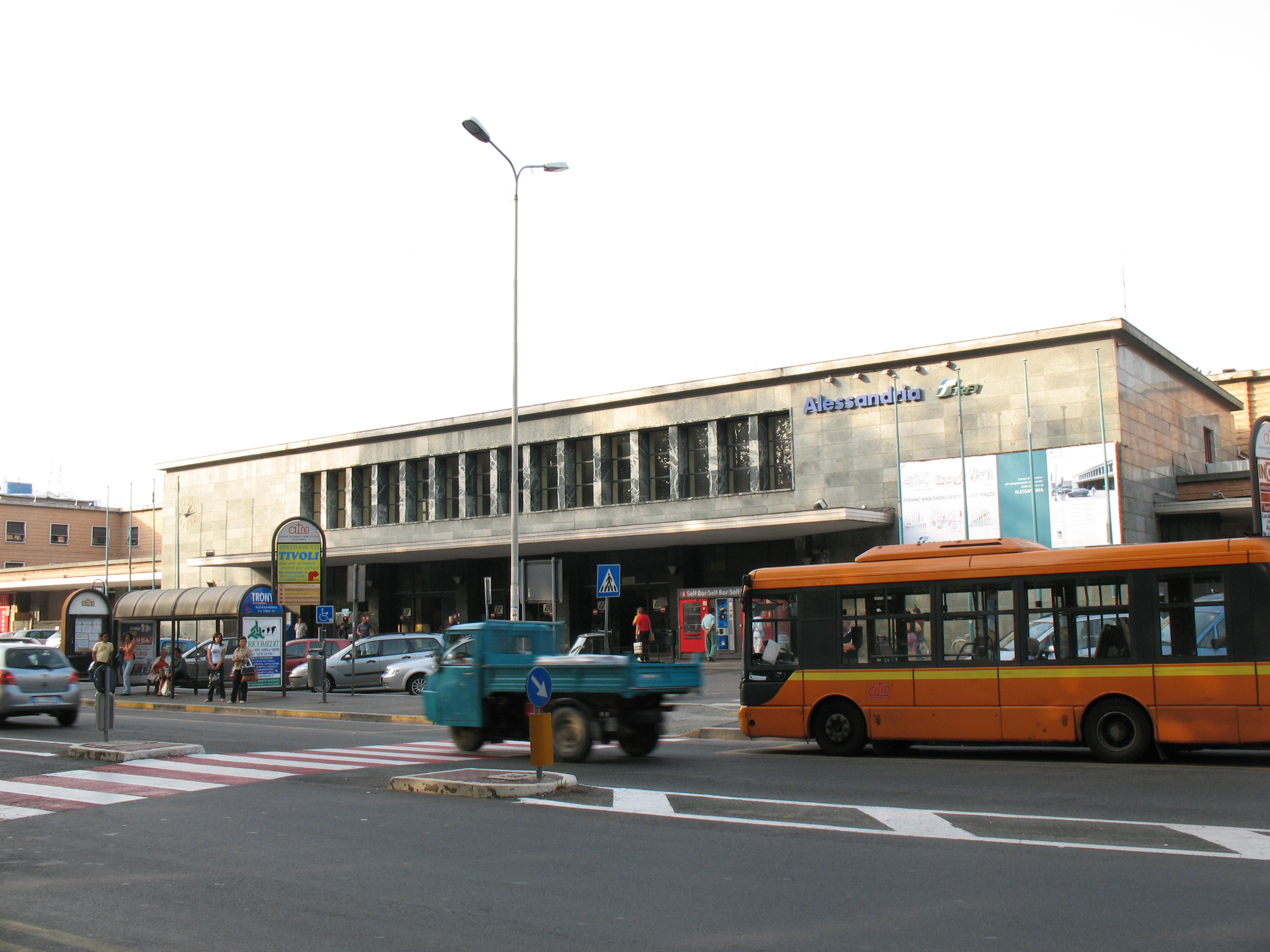

General information
- Location: Piazza Eugenio Curiel; 15121 Alessandria AL; Alessandria, Alessandria, Piedmont; Italy
- Coordinates: 44°54′33″N 08°36′23″E
- Operator: Rete Ferroviaria Italiana; Centostazioni
- Lines: Turin–Genoa; Chivasso–Alessandria; Alessandria–Piacenza; Novara–Alessandria; Pavia–Alessandria; Alessandria–Cavallermaggiore; Alessandria–Ovada; Alessandria–San Giuseppe di Cairo
- Distance: 90.075 km (55.970 mi) from Torino Porta Nuova
- Train operators: Trenitalia
- Connections: Urban and suburban buses

Other information
- Classification: Gold

History
- Opened: 1 January 1850; 176 years ago
Location
- Location within Piedmont Location within Northern Italy Location within Italy

Alessandria railway station (Italian: Stazione di Alessandria) serves the city and comune of Alessandria, in the Piedmont region, northwestern Italy. Opened in 1850, it forms part of the Turin–Genoa railway, and is also a junction for six other lines, to Chivasso, Piacenza, Novara, Pavia, Cavallermaggiore, Ovada and San Giuseppe di Cairo.

The station is currently managed by Rete Ferroviaria Italiana (RFI). However, the commercial area of the passenger building is managed by Centostazioni. Train services are operated by Trenitalia. Each of these companies is a subsidiary of Ferrovie dello Stato Italiane (FS), Italy's state-owned rail company.

== History ==
The station was opened on 1 January 1850, upon the inauguration of the Asti–Alessandria–Novi Ligure section of the Turin–Genoa railway.

== Passenger and train movements ==
The station has around 6.5 million passenger movements each year. There are about 339 trains per day.

The trains stopping at Alessandria are InterCity, express and regional trains. Their main destinations are Turin, Genoa and Novara.

== Interchange ==
The station is also a major interchange with the urban and suburban bus lines operated by AMAG Mobilità, and suburban bus lines operated by Arfea.

== See also ==
- History of rail transport in Italy
- List of railway stations in Piedmont
- Rail transport in Italy
- Railway stations in Italy
