= Magenta railway station =

Railway station in Italy

Magenta
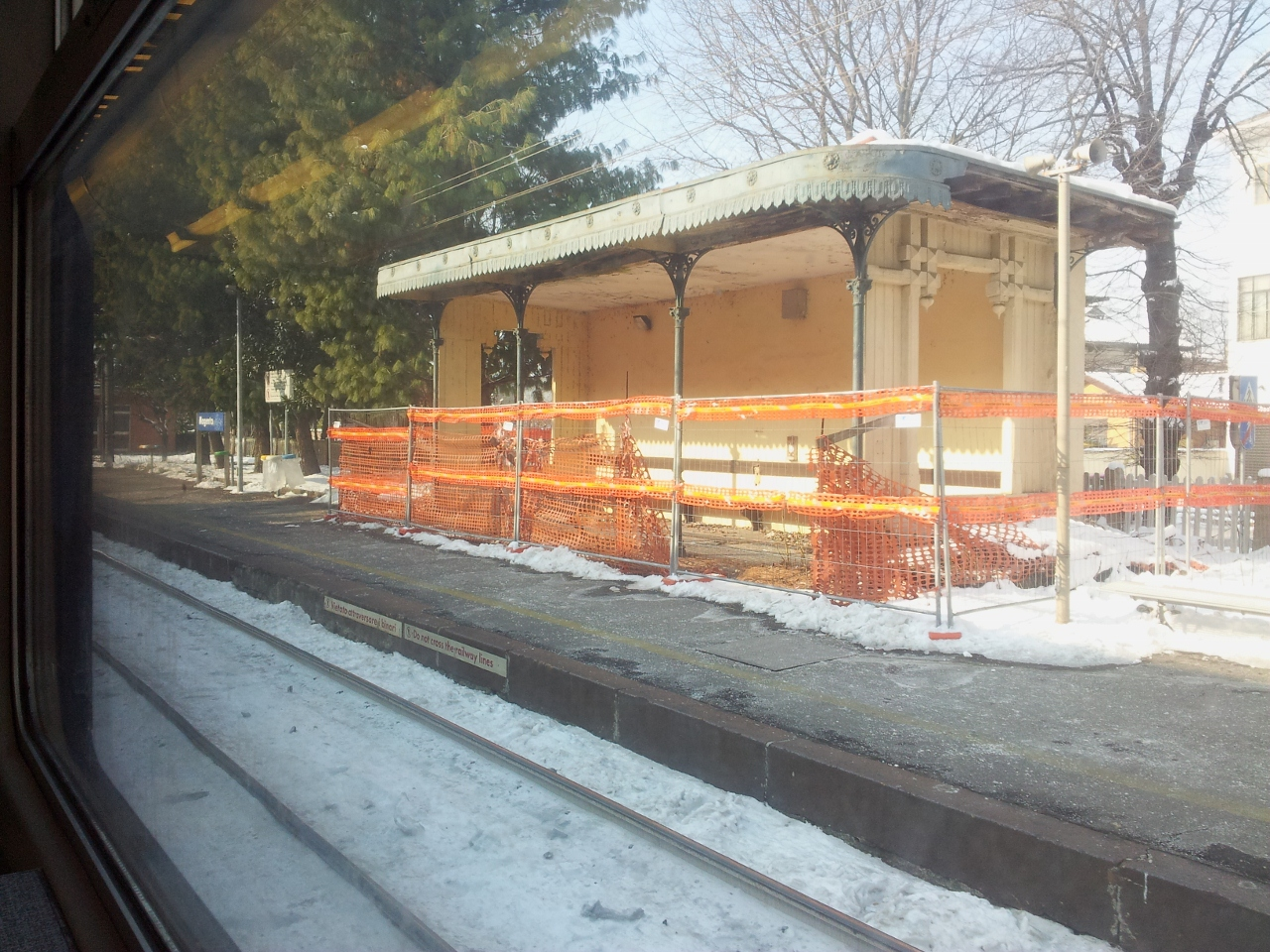
- Magenta railway station

General information
- Location: Magenta, Milan, Lombardy; Italy
- Coordinates: 45°28′05″N 08°52′51″E
- Operator: Rete Ferroviaria Italiana
- Line: Turin–Milan
- Distance: 30 km (19 mi) from Milano Centrale
- Platforms: 2
- Tracks: 2
- Train operators: Trenord; Trenitalia

Other information
- Fare zone: STIBM: Mi7
- Classification: Silver

History
- Opened: 1858 June 18; 168 years ago

Services
Preceding station	Trenord	Following station
Trecate towards Novara	Line S6 (Milan suburban railway service)	Corbetta–Santo Stefano Ticino towards Treviglio
Location
- Location within Lombardy Location within Northern Italy Location within Italy

Magenta (Italian: Stazione di Magenta) is a railway station in the Italian town of Magenta. The station was opened on 18 June 1858 by the Austrian Empire, and is located on the Turin–Milan railway. The train services are operated by Trenitalia and Trenord.

The station was the location of the battle of Magenta, which also gave the name to the Magenta station in Paris.

== Train services ==
The station is served by the following services:

- Express services (Regionale Veloce) Turin - Chivasso – Vercelli – Novara – Milan
- Milan Metropolitan services (S6) Novara - Milan - Treviglio

== See also ==
- History of rail transport in Italy
- List of railway stations in Lombardy
- Rail transport in Italy
- Railway stations in Italy
