= Pavia–Alessandria railway =

Railway line in Italy

Overview
- Status: in use
- Owner: RFI
- Line number: 13
- Locale: Lombardy and Piedmont, Italy
- Termini: Pavia; Alessandria

Service
- Type: Heavy rail
- Operator(s): Trenord

History
- Opened: 1862

Technical
- Line length: 63 km (39 mi)
- Number of tracks: 1 (Pavia–Torreberetti); 2 (Torreberetti–Alessandria)
- Track gauge: 1,435 mm (4 ft 8 1/2 in) standard gauge
- Electrification: 3 kV DC (Torreberetti–Alessandria)
- Operating speed: 135 km/h (84 mph)

The Pavia–Alessandria railway is a railway line in Italy.

== History ==
The line was opened in 1862. Between Torreberetti and Alessandria it uses the Novara–Alessandria railway, opened in 1854.

== See also ==
- List of railway lines in Italy
