= Feldgrau =

Green-grey color used by the German military

Color coordinates
- Hex triplet: #4D5D53
- sRGB^{B} (r, g, b): (77, 93, 83)
- HSV (h, s, v): (142°, 17%, 36%)
- CIELCh_{uv} (L, C, h): (38, 10, 144°)
- ISCC–NBS descriptor: Dark grayish green
- B: Normalized to [0–255] (byte)

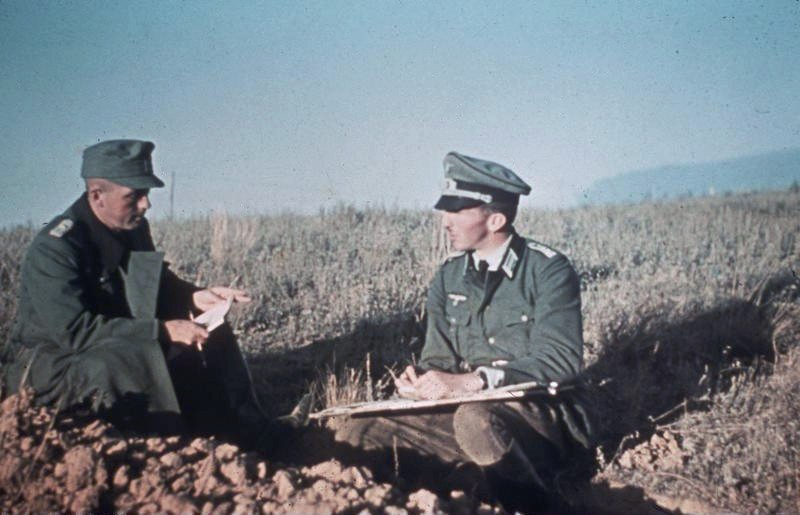
Feldgrau of the Wehrmacht (Stalingrad 1942)

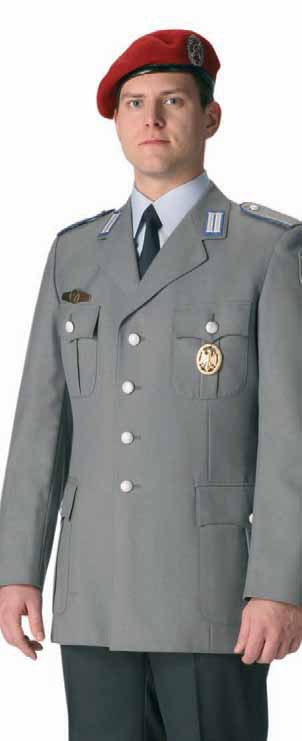
Service dress in Hellgrau (German Bundeswehr)

Feldgrau (English: field-grey) is a green–grey color. It was the official basic color of military uniforms of the German armed forces from the early 20th century until 1945 (West Germany) or 1989 (East Germany). Armed forces of other countries also used various shades of that color. Feldgrau was used to refer to the color of uniforms of the armies of Germany, first the Imperial German Army and later the Heer (ground forces) of the Reichswehr and the Wehrmacht.

== Variations ==
In World War I the colour feldgrau evolved from the light grey of peacetime field uniforms to darker green-grey shades after 1915. Supply shortages led to other variations of the colour throughout the war, ranging from greys to browns.

Feldgrau is commonly used to refer to the colour of German army uniforms during World War II. It was also used by the East German National People's Army, under the description steingrau (stone-grey). Feldgrau was introduced to the Austrian Bundesheer in line to the German pattern as well.

== History ==
In 1907, the so-called field-grey peace uniform (feldgraue Friedensuniform), with colored cuffs, facings, shoulder straps and gorgets began to be issued by decree in Prussia, followed by the non-Prussian contingents of the other German states and lastly by the Bavarian Army in April 1916. Formerly most infantry regiments in the German Imperial Army wore Prussian blue tunics, although Bavarian units had light blue and jägers dark green. Cavalry uniforms were of a wide range of colors. Until the outbreak of war in August 1914, the traditional brightly colored uniforms of the Deutsches Heer continued to be worn as parade and off-duty wear. Barracks dress was normally an off-white loose fitting fatigue dress and the field-grey uniform fully introduced by 1910 was generally reserved for maneuvers and field training. Upon the outbreak of war field-grey became the normal uniform of all German soldiers. Active service experience led to the adoption of a darker grey-green shade of color in 1915, now described as "stone-grey".

Following the German example, other countries selected feldgrau in either light grey or green-grey shades as the basic color for their service uniforms. Examples were Portugal (1910), and Sweden (1923). After testing, Italy adopted a similar colored uniform with a greenish tinge on 4 December 1908, known as Grigio Verde.

== Other countries today ==
=== Austria ===
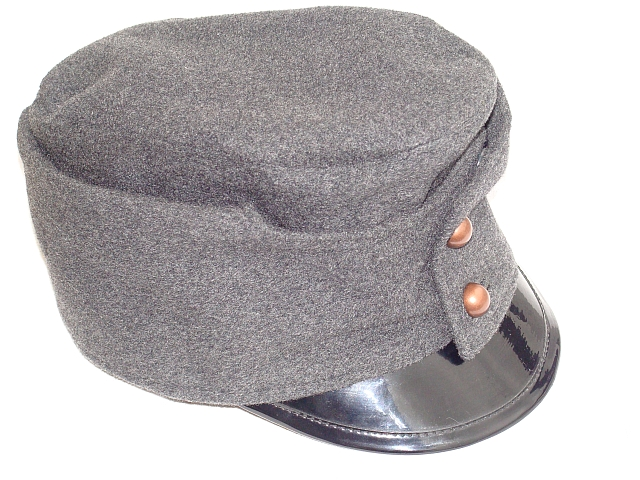
Austrian service cap in Hechtgrau (pike-grey)

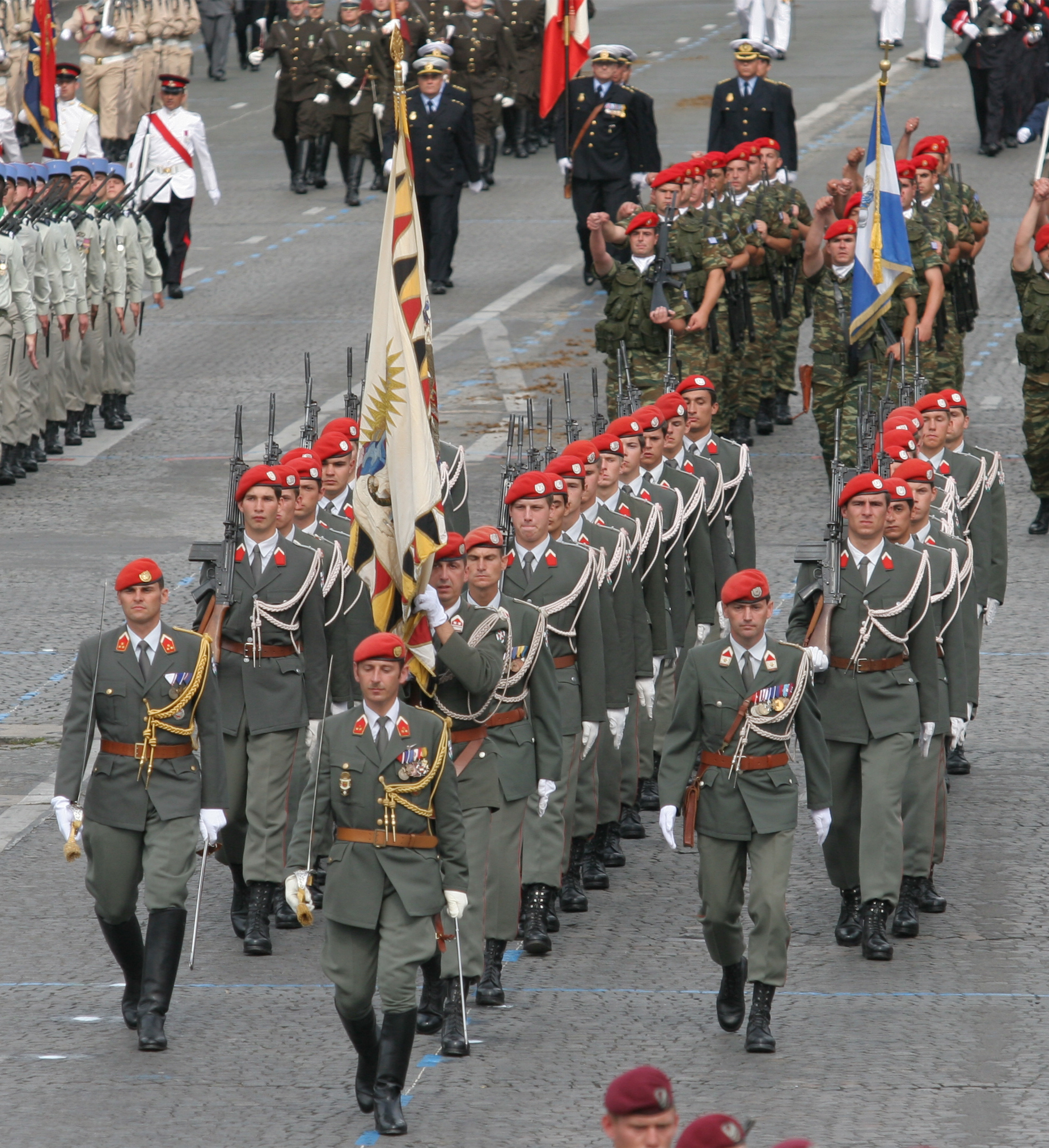
Austrian uniform color

In 1909 the Austro-Hungarian Army adopted pike-grey (Hechtgrau) as the color of the field service uniform of its infantry, artillery, engineers and transport units. Previously it had been reserved for Jaeger and Landwehr regiments. Following the outbreak of World War I the light blue-grey shade of Hechtgrau proved unsuited for campaigning in Europe and from 1915 onwards the green-grey feldgrau was substituted.

At the formation of the First Austrian Republic's armed forces in 1929, there were strong similarities to German uniforms, including the feldgrau uniform and the corps colors and rank insignia adopted.

Today, in accordance with national traditions, the uniform color of the Austrian Armed Forces is named feldgrau, though other shades such as braungrau (English: brown-grey), and steingrau (stone-grey) are used, along with NATO-oliv (NATO-olive).

=== Chile ===
The Chilean Army also wears a full dress uniform in feldgrau.

=== Finland ===
The current dress uniform of the Finnish Army (M/83) is a grey uniform patterned after the German 1944 uniform. The Finnish Army has used grey uniforms since its founding in 1918. M/83 and its equally grey predecessors were used as the common service uniform up to the 1980s, with camouflage (M/62) used only in the field uniform. Today, the common service uniform is a camouflage uniform (M/62, M/91 or M/05). The grey colour is called kenttäharmaa (literally "field grey") in Finnish, sometimes also known as armeijan harmaat (army greys). "Going into army greys" remains a popular saying for entering military service.

=== Sweden ===
The Swedish Armed Forces used a very similar color for infantry uniforms; for example the grey m/39 and later on grey-green, as the German ones. The last uniform in the latter color was the woollen m/58 winter uniform.

== Shades of grey ==
The table below shows some shades of grey in line to the rough RAL colors

Number	Sample	CIELAB L*	CIELAB a*	CIELAB b*	German name	English name	Description and examples
#5d5d3d (HTML-code)					Feldgrau	Field grey	Typical Feldgrau of the Reichsheer and Reichswehr 1907–1935
RAL 6006 grauoliv					Feldgrau	Field grey	Basic color of the Wehrmacht 1937–1945
RAL 7008		45.91	3.34	17.92	Khakigrau	Khaki grey	original name: Graugrün (Grey green)
RAL 7009		43.19	−2.43	3.87	Grüngrau	Green grey	original name: Feldgrau Nr.2 (Field grey No.2), Basic color of the Reichsheer and Wehrmacht until 1935.
RAL 7013		39.21	0.59	6.33	Feldgrau/Steingrau	Field grey/Stone grey	Austrian Bundesheer, GDR National People's Army 1956–1989
RAL 7016		33.84	−1.33	−2.83	Anthrazitgrau	Anthracite grey	Added for use by the Wehrmacht
RAL 7021		30.65	−0.43	−1.22	Schwarzgrau	Black grey	1937 added for use by the Wehrmacht under the name Dunkelgrau (dark grey)
RAL 7037		30.65	−0.43	−1.22	Staubgrau	Dust grey	Used since 1956 by the German Bundeswehr under the name Hellgrau (light grey)

== See also ==
- Hechtgrau
- Marengo
- OG-107
- Slate gray
