= Marengo (color) =

Shade of grey

Color coordinates
- Hex triplet: #4C5866
- sRGB^{B} (r, g, b): (76, 88, 102)
- HSV (h, s, v): (212°, 25%, 40%)
- CIELCh_{uv} (L, C, h): (37, 14, 242°)
- ISCC–NBS descriptor: Grayish blue
- B: Normalized to [0–255] (byte)

Marengo-clair

Color coordinates
- Hex triplet: #D7D7D7
- sRGB^{B} (r, g, b): (215, 215, 215)
- HSV (h, s, v): (0°, 0%, 84%)
- CIELCh_{uv} (L, C, h): (86, 0, 0°)
- ISCC–NBS descriptor: Light gray
- B: Normalized to [0–255] (byte)

Marengo is a shade of gray (black with gray tinge) or blue colors. Sometimes the color is described as a color of a wet asphalt. In the cloth manufacturing industry, marengo usually refers to the color of the fabric and means black or dark brown with small inclusions of white. Sometimes the word refers to black fabric with white threads.

== Origin ==
The name marengo appeared in Europe in the 18th century and meant a dark brown fabric with white speckles. The fabric was initially produced in the village of Spinetta Marengo in northern Italy. In France, the color was called marengo ou brun (marengo or brown). After the Battle of Marengo of 14 June 1800, in which Napoleon Bonaparte's troops defeated the Austrian army, marengo became known as gray or black fabric with splashes of white or gray thread. This color became associated with a gray overcoat that Bonaparte briefly brought into vogue. Napoleon's famous war mount was also called Marengo. Marengo color became popular in Russia, and, at the beginning of the 19th century, there appeared another, light gray variation of the color called marengo-claire (marengo light).

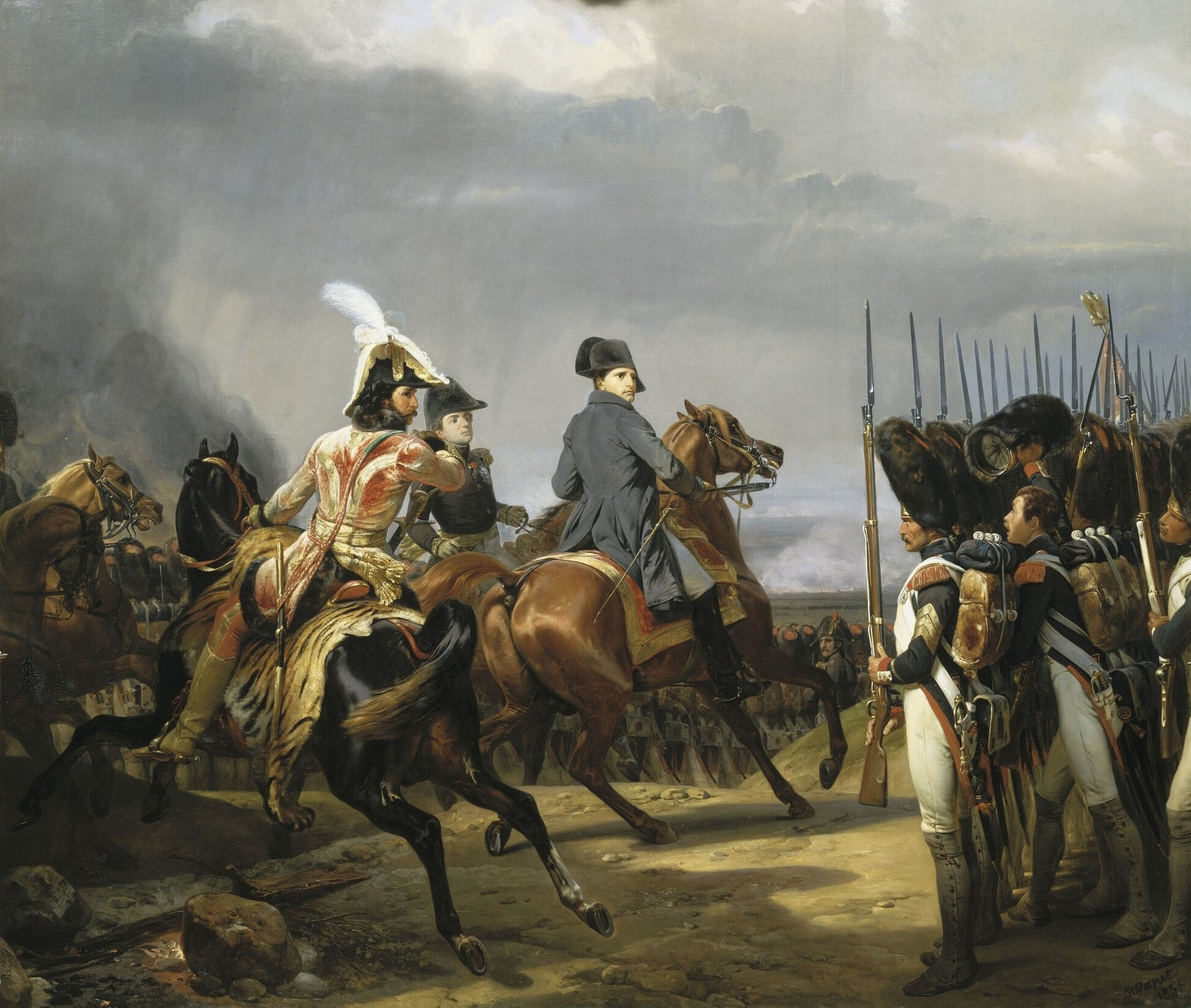
The Battle of Jena (1836) by Horace Vernet. Napoleon wears a marengo overcoat.

== Use ==
The marengo color was used in the Soviet Union for various uniforms. In 1921, the color was approved for Navy uniforms. In 1923, the Soviet Militsiya received new uniforms of marengo color.

== See also ==
- Feldgrau
- List of colors
- Police of Russia
