= Marengo (horse) =

War horse of Napoleon Bonaparte

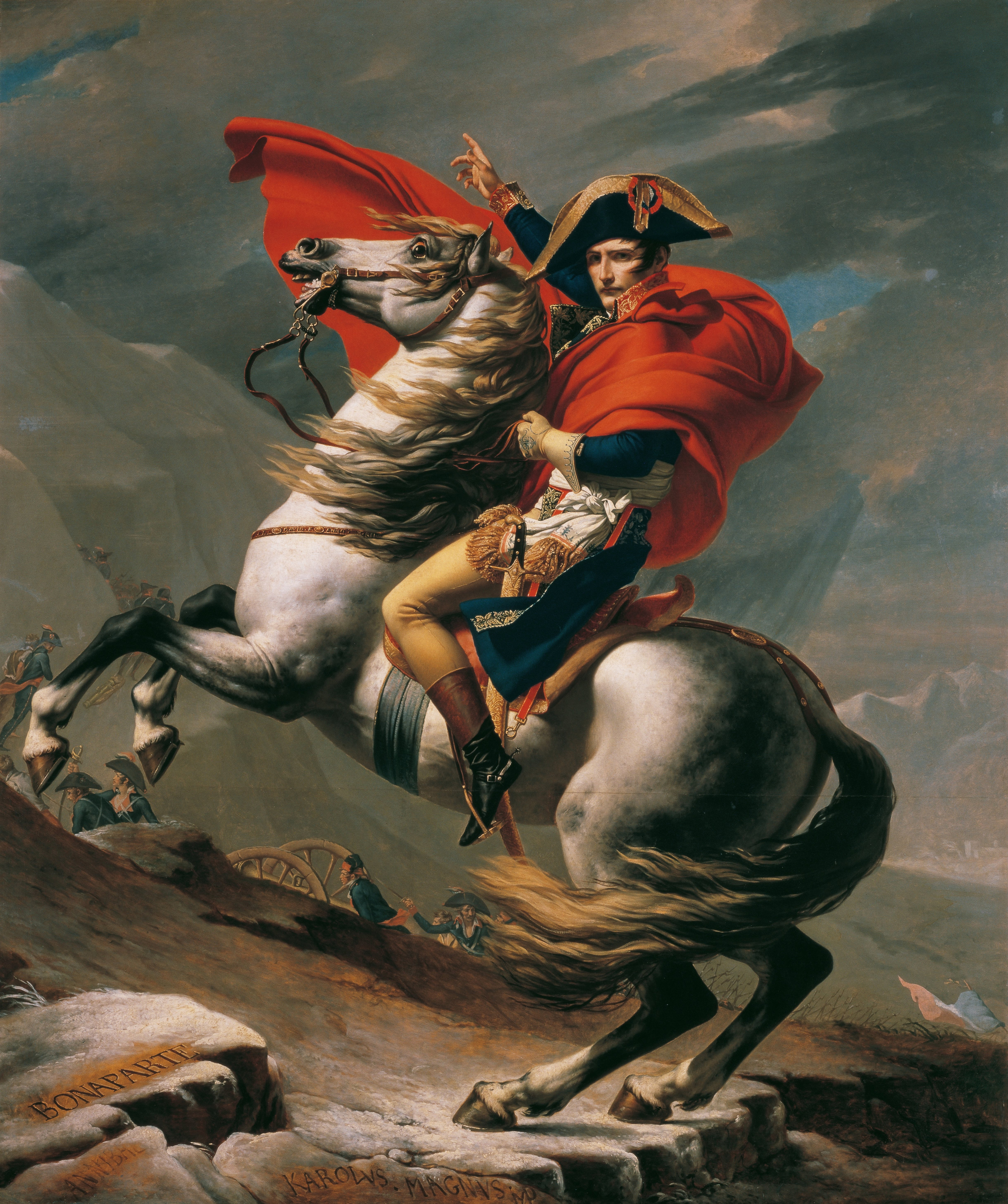
Napoleon Crossing the Alps painted by Jacques-Louis David. The horse in the painting is believed to be Marengo.

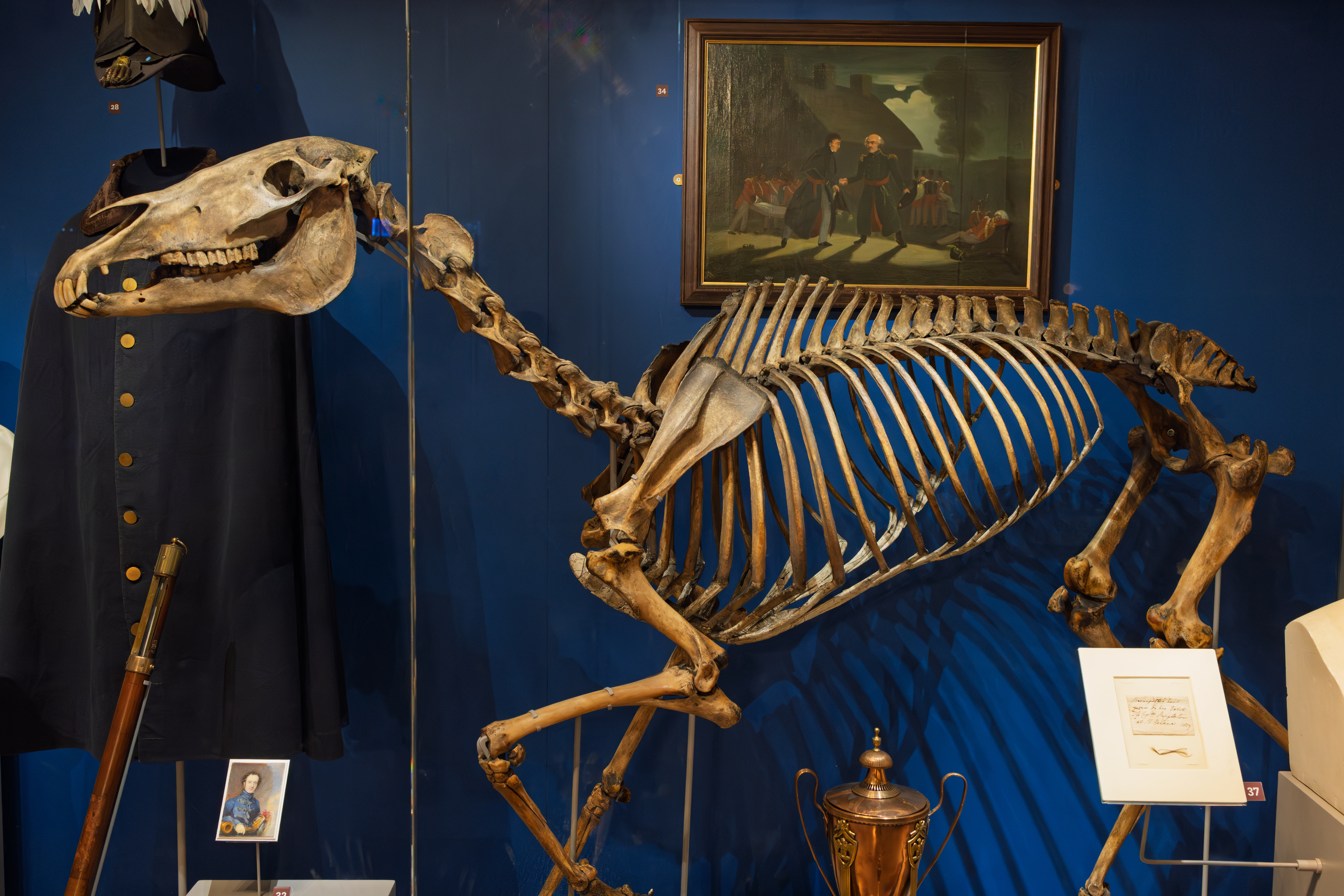
Marengo's skeleton on display at the National Army Museum, London, in 2026

Marengo (c. 1793 – 1831) was the famous war horse of Napoleon I of France. Named after the Battle of Marengo, through which he carried his rider safely, he was imported to France from Egypt following the Battle of Abukir in 1799 as a six-year-old. An Arabian breed, greyish-white coat, Marengo was probably bred at the famous El Naseri stud. Although small in size (only 14.1 hands (57 inches, 145 cm)) for his species, he was described as a reliable, steady mount.

== Career ==
Marengo was wounded eight times in his career, and carried the Emperor in the Battle of Austerlitz, Battle of Jena-Auerstedt, Battle of Wagram, and Battle of Waterloo. He was frequently used in the 80-mile gallops from Valladolid to Burgos, which he often completed in five hours. As one of 52 horses in Napoleon's personal stud, Marengo fled with these horses when it was raided by Russians in 1812, surviving the retreat from Moscow; however, the stallion was captured in 1815 at the Battle of Waterloo by William Petre, 11th Baron Petre.

Petre brought the horse back to the United Kingdom and sold him on to Lieutenant-Colonel Angerstein of the Grenadier Guards. Marengo stood at stud (unsuccessfully) at New Barnes, near Ely, at the age of 27. He eventually died aged 38 and his skeleton (minus two hooves) was preserved and later passed to the Royal United Services Institute and is now on display at the National Army Museum in Chelsea, London. One of the remaining hooves was given to the officers of the Brigade of Guards by John Julius Angerstein as a snuff box. The fourth hoof was mounted as a silver inkwell and retained by the family; it is still owned by the family but is now on loan to the Household Cavalry Museum. The Duke of Wellington was asked to disinter his own horse, Copenhagen, to be exhibited alongside Marengo, but refused to do so. Coincidentally, one of Copenhagen's hooves was also later used as an ornament.

The records of the Imperial stables contain no mention of Marengo. It remains possible this was the nickname of another horse (such dual names are known).

== See also ==
- List of historical horses
- Marengo (color), a dark color associated with a gray overcoat that Bonaparte briefly brought into vogue.
- Vizir, another horse associated with Napoléon and preserved in the Musée de l'armée
