= Voghera train crash =

Train crash in which 64 people died

Coordinates: 44°59′52″N 09°00′31″E

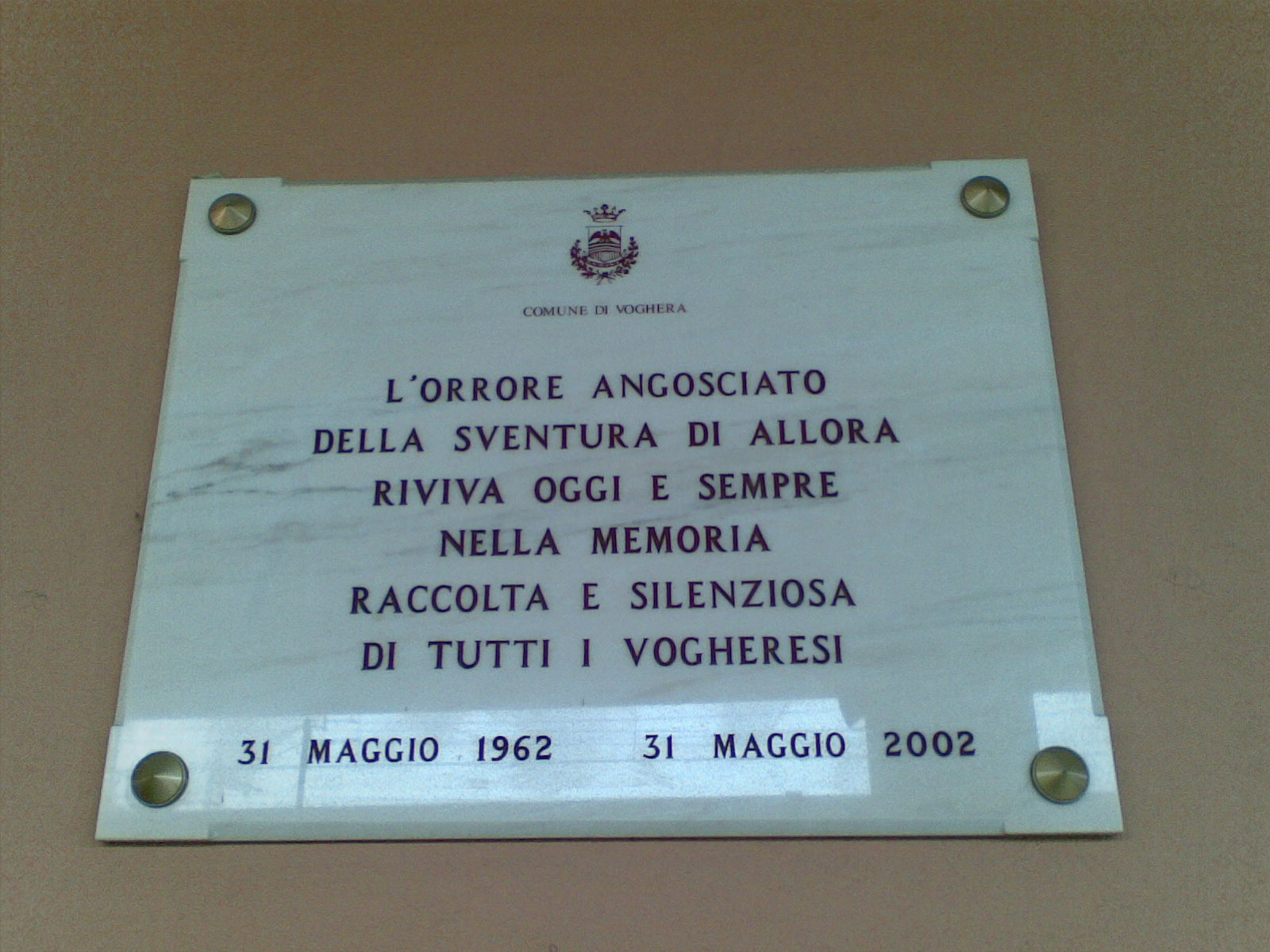
- Memorial stone at the station

Details
- Date: 31 May 1962
- Location: Voghera railway station
- Country: Italy
- Line: Milano–Pavia–Voghera; Alessandria–Piacenza
- Operator: Ferrovie dello Stato
- Incident type: Collision

Statistics
- Trains: 2
- Deaths: 64
- Injured: 40

The Voghera train crash is considered one of the most serious incidents in the history of the Italian railways. It happened at track three of Voghera railway station, on the night of 31 May 1962. 64 people died, and 40 were seriously injured.

== History ==
At 2.35 on 31 May 1962, freight train №. 8151, from Milan, hauled by an E626 class electric locomotive, entered Voghera station at high speed, against protection signals set to 'danger'. It then collided with the rear of passenger train №. 1391, which was stationary on Track 3, and about to depart for Genoa.

The locomotive of train 8151 became wedged in the last carriage of train 1391, killing 60 people instantly and injuring over 40, four of whom later died in hospital. All of the victims were in the last carriage. They were mostly holidaymakers bound for the Ligurian Riviera.

== Investigations ==
Examination of the wheel speed sensor date from the locomotive at the head of train 8151 revealed that the train appeared to have been travelling at between 70 km/h (43 mph) and 75 km/h (47 mph) all the way from Milan Rogoredo, except for a brief slowdown near Pavia. The train's speed had not diminished even upon arrival at Voghera, except during the nine seconds immediately before the collision, when it had fallen sharply from 72 km/h (45 mph) to about 60 km/h (37 mph).

This speed was not in any way acceptable, regardless of the danger setting displayed by the signal, given that the train was due to stop at the station for a change of traction. At that time, the Milan–Voghera was energised with DC electric current, and the Voghera–Genoa section with three-phase AC current, imposing a requirement for a change of locomotive at Voghera.

The train braking on train 8151 had been activated only about 170 m (558 ft) from the rear of the train 1391. Given the characteristics of the brake, and its time of entry into operation, it can be assumed that it was activated in response to stop signals given by hand by station staff, as in fact was admitted by the driver.

== Commemorations ==
On 31 May 2002, the 40th anniversary of the accident, a marble commemorative plaque was placed on a wall of Voghera railway main station (facing platform 1 near the newsstand). The plaque bears the following inscription: "The distressing horror of the time of trouble lives again today and will live forever in the memory and silence of all Vogherese. 31 May 1962 - 31 May 2002." The ceremony was attended by representatives of local authorities.
