= Spinetta Marengo =

Town in Italy

Coordinates: 44°53′8″N 8°40′39″E

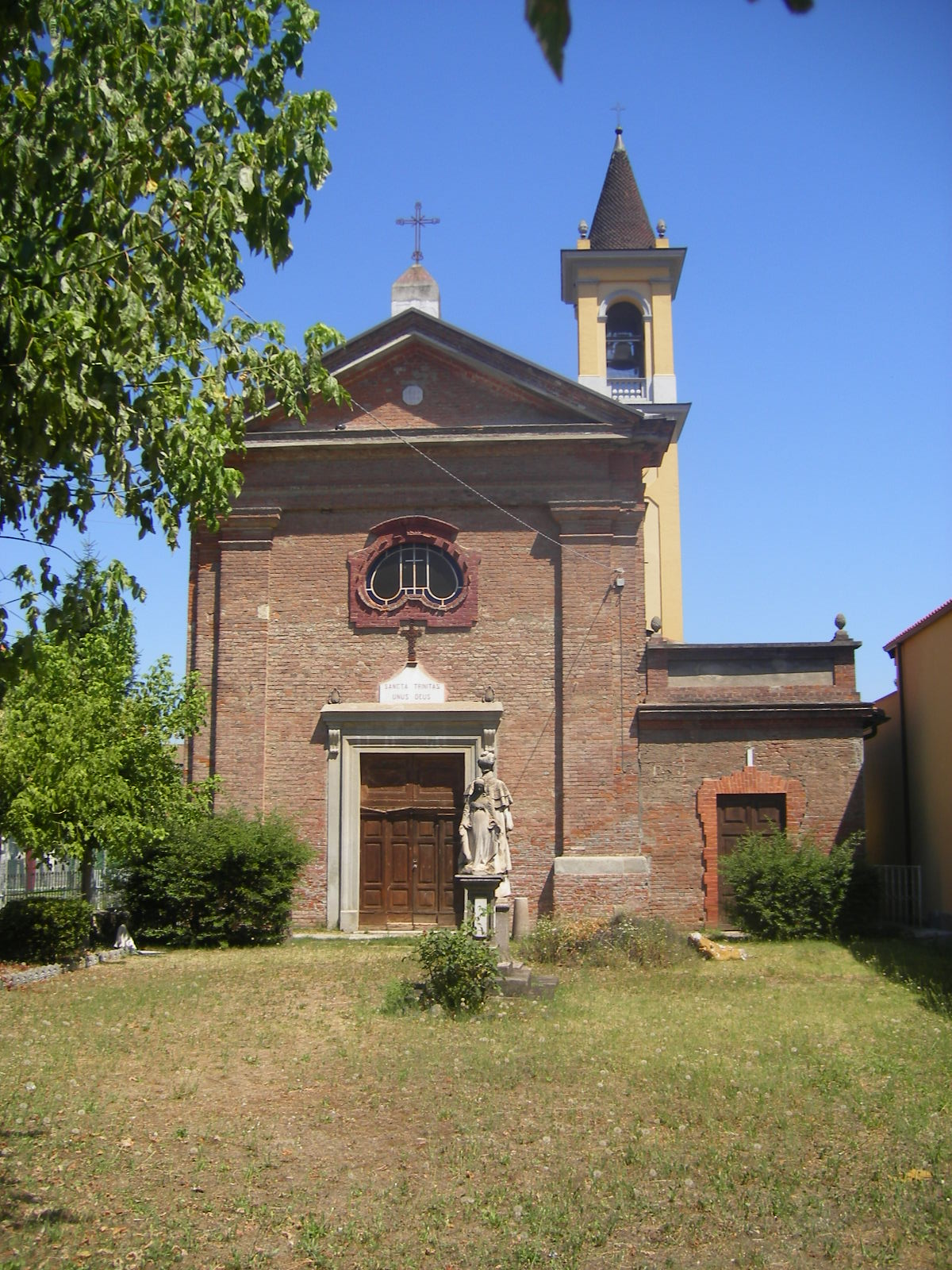
Holy Trinity church in Spinetta Marengo

Spinetta Marengo (Piedmontese: Marengh) is a town in Piedmont, Italy located within the municipal boundaries of the comune of Alessandria. The population is 6,417.

On 14 June 1800 the village was the scene of an important battle between the French army commanded by Napoleon and an Austrian army led by Melas. Every second Sunday in June, there is traditionally a costumed commemoration of the battle, drawing many international visitors. According to local legend, Majno, a thief who was said to have robbed Pope Pius VII while on his way to Paris in 1804 to crown Napoleon emperor, laid up in hiding in the woods of Fraschetta, just by Spinetta Marengo.

The dish Chicken Marengo is named after the town. According to legend, Napoleon's chef created the dish from the few ingredients he could find after the battle, using a sabre instead of a cooking knife.

== Industry ==
Situated in the "industrial triangle" between three cities in North Italy (Milan, Genoa and Turin), the Spinetta Marengo chemical plant dates back to 1905 and is situated adjacent to the town on 130 ha. At times it employed up to 1,300 people (600 in 2025). The "Società di Marengo", entrepreneurs from Alessandria were the founders in 1905. Different chemicals have been manufactured since that time. Since 2002 Solvay (Syensqo) has produced fluorotensioactives - Hyflon and Algoflon fluoropolymers (until 2023), Monomers, Fluoroionomers used in zero emissions technology, and Fluoroelastomers like PFR, and PTFE. In 1941, a case of widespread pollution due to chromium infiltration into aquifers was brought. The same issue emerged in 2012, when tests by the Alessandris Public Prosecutors office showed hexavalent chromium under the plant across 1,150 cubic meters within a three-kilometer radius. The criminal trial began in 2013 and Ausimont and Solvay managers were convicted in 2019, forcing an industrial cleanup PFAS contamination was also found, with statistically significant mortalities for melanomas, arterial hypertension, and lung, bladder and kidney cancers.

== Museum ==
A museum about the battle is today housed in the Villa Delavo, inaugurated in 1847 and built by Antonio Delavo. In this museum you can see mural paintings, videos, maps, mannequins in vintage uniforms, and other objects related to Napoleon or the battle of Marengo.

A pyramid which became the symbol of the museum was also inaugurated in May 2009. 200 years later, it echoes the wish of Napoleon to build a pyramid in honor of those who died at the battle in 1800.

== The Marengo treasure ==
In 1928, precious objects from the Roman period were uncovered by farmers in a field near the village of Marengo. Dating from the second century, the objects, all in very bad condition, included a silver bust representing the emperor Lucius Verus and a silver vase decorated with acanthus leaves. The objects today are conserved in the Museum of Antiquity of Turin, awaiting restoration.

== See also ==
- Marengo (color)
- Marengo (horse)
