= Alessandria–Piacenza railway =

Railway in Italy

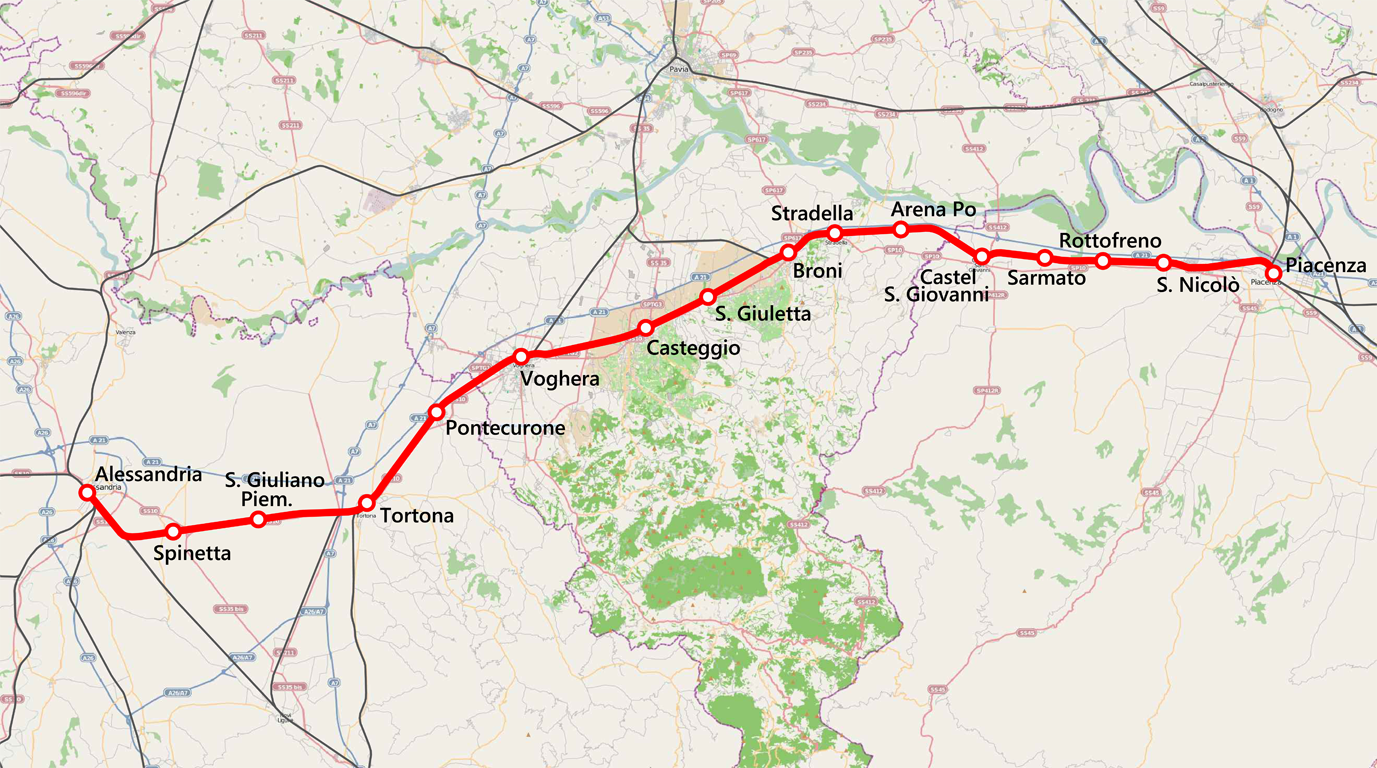
- Map of the railway

Overview
- Native name: Ferrovia Alessandria–Piacenza
- Status: Operational
- Line number: 33

Service
- Operator: Rete Ferroviaria Italiana

History
- Work began: 16 January 1856
- Opened: 25 January 1858
- Completed: 1860

Technical
- Track gauge: 1,435 mm (4 ft 8 1/2 in)
- Electrification: 3 kV direct current

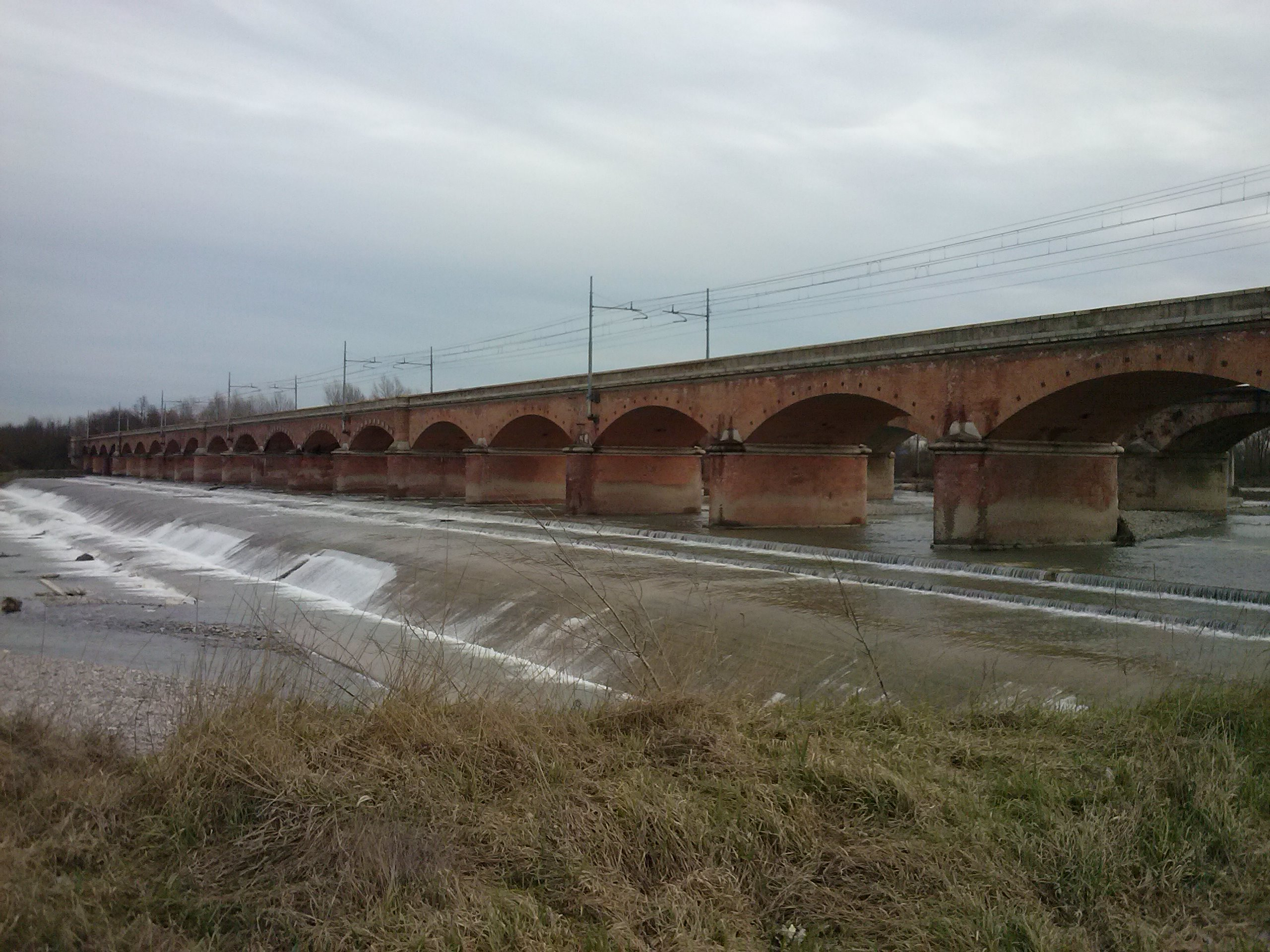
Bridge over the Trebbia

The Alessandria–Piacenza railway is a railway located in northern Italy connecting the regions of Emilia-Romagna, Lombardy, and Piedmont. The railway is 96 kilometres (60 mi) long and it is managed by RFI. It links the rail hub of Alessandria with that of Piacenza, passing through the cities of Tortona, Voghera, and Stradella.

== History ==
The works for the construction of the railway began on 16 January 1856: the initial project included the section between Alessandria and Stradella, as well as a branch from Tortona to Novi Ligure. In June 1858 a decree was approved by the Chamber for the Facilitazione per l'unione della Società della ferrovia da Alessandria e Novi a Stradella con quella di Piacenza (Facilitation of the union of the railway company from Alessandria and Novi to Stradella with that of Piacenza) In 1859, the territory of the Duchy of Parma and Piacenza were incorporated into the United Provinces of Central Italy and subsequently annexed to the Kingdom of Sardinia as a result of the plebiscite of 12 March 1860. Following the annexation, the railway was extended to Piacenza.

Section	Opened
Alessandria-Casteggio	25 January 1858
Casteggio-Stradella	22 July 1858
Stradella-Castel San Giovanni	5 September 1859
Castel San Giovanni-San Nicolò	20 October 1859
San Nicolò-ponte Trebbia	20 November 1859
ponte Trebbia-Piacenza	19 January 1860

The first section, between Alessandria and Casteggio was opened on 25 January 1858. The section was opened to Stradella in the following July, while the Piacenza sections of the line were opened between 1859 and 1860, the last of which, between the bridge over the Trebbia river and Piacenza, was opened to traffic on 19 January 1860.

Starting from 1 July 1905, under law no.137 of 22 April 1905, the operation of the railway line was taken over by the Italian state, through the newly established Azienda autonoma per l'esercizio delle Ferrovie Italiane (Ferrovie dello Stato), under the control of the Ministry of Public Works.

A crash occurred at Voghera on the night of 31 May 1962, when a freight train from Milan hit the end of a passenger train that was stationary on platform 3 and about to leave for Genoa. 64 people lost their lives, and 40 were seriously injured, 4 of whom later died in hospital bringing the death toll to 64.

== Characteristics ==
The railway has a gauge of 1435 mm. It is electrified at 3000V, and it can bear a weight of 22.5 tons per axis.

== See also ==
- Marengo–Mandrogne Tramway
