= Turin–Milan railway =

Italian railway line

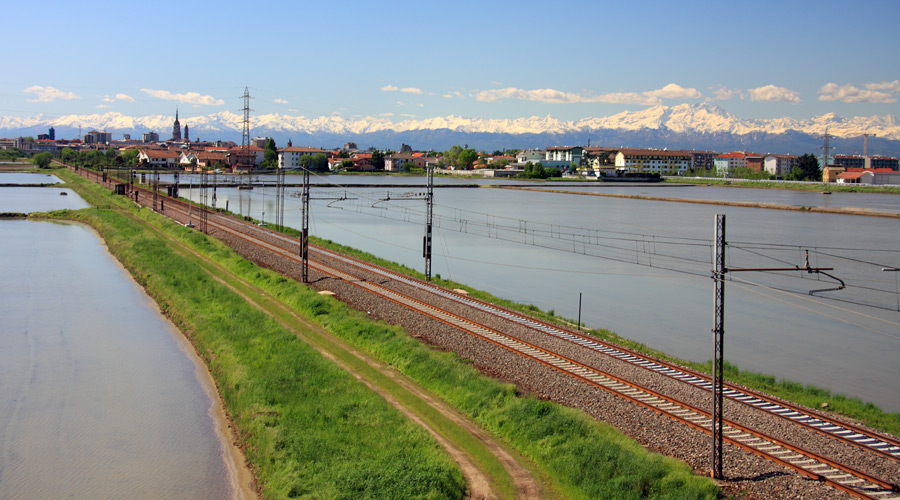
- The railway near Novara

Overview
- Native name: Ferrovia Torino-Milano
- Status: in use
- Owner: RFI
- Locale: Italy
- Termini: Turin; Milan
- Stations: 18 station, 8 stops

Service
- Type: heavy rail
- Services: S6
- Operator(s): Trenitalia, Trenord

History
- Opened: 1 July 1859

Technical
- Line length: 153 km (95 mi)
- Number of tracks: 2
- Track gauge: 1,435 mm (4 ft 8 1/2 in) standard gauge
- Electrification: 3 kV DC
- Operating speed: 160 km/h (99 mph)

The Turin–Milan railway is a major Italian railway that links the cities of Turin and Milan. The railway is double track, standard gauge and fully electrified at 3 kV DC. It connects the cities of Settimo Torinese, Chivasso, Santhià, Vercelli, Novara, Magenta and Rho. Since February 2006 high-speed trains have operated over the Turin–Milan high-speed line between Turin and Novara. The remainder of the high-speed line between Novara and Milan was opened in December 2009, when the Bologna–Florence high-speed line and the remaining sections of the Rome–Naples high-speed railway line and the Naples–Salerno high-speed line are opened, completing the high-speed network between Turin and Salerno.

== History ==
=== Construction and opening ===
The line was built by Thomas Brassey under contract to the Società Vittorio Emanuele ("Victor Emmanuel Company", named in honour of Victor Emmanuel II, then king of Piedmont and Sardinia) and opened between Turin and Novara on 20 October 1856 and extended to the Ticino river—which formed the boundary between Piedmont and the Kingdom of Lombardy–Venetia (then part of the Austrian Empire)—on 18 October 1858. The bridge over the river connecting to the existing railway from Milan at Magenta was opened on 1 June 1859.

Three days later the French-Sardinian army led by Napoleon III defeated the Austrians at the Battle of Magenta with the help of supplies brought by the new railway. This was a major step in the unification of Italy.

The line formed part of the Società per le strade ferrate dell'Alta Italia (Upper Italian Railways) from 1865 and the Società per le Strade Ferrate del Mediterraneo (Mediterranean Railway Company) from 1885.

=== In the twentieth century ===
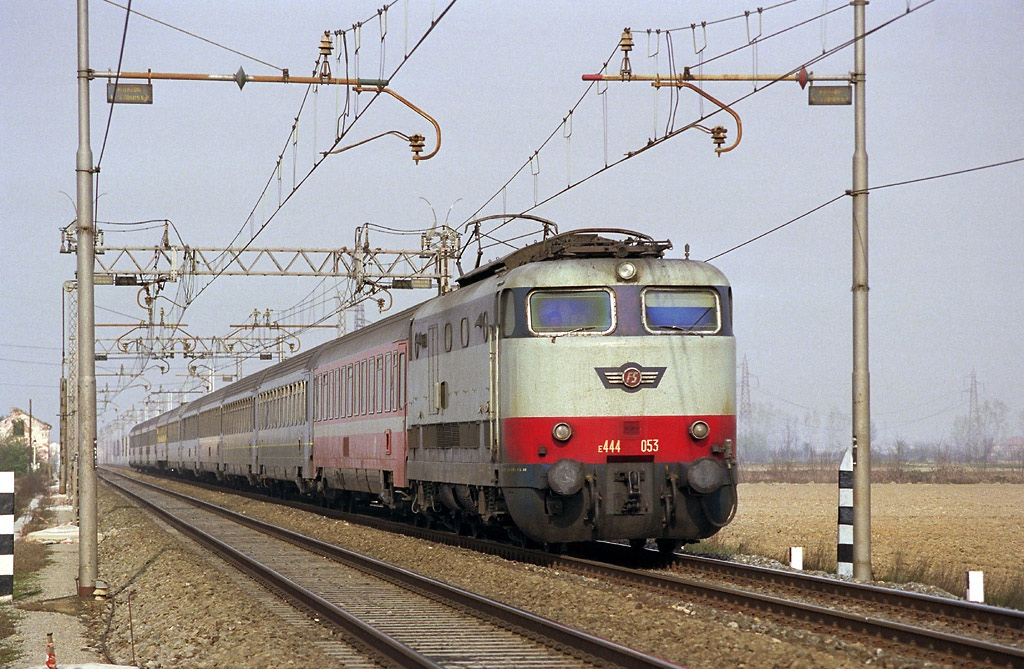
An intercity at Ponzana

Following the nationalisation of the railways, the line was incorporated into the state network and its operation was taken over by Ferrovie dello Stato between 1905 and 1906.

The line was severely damaged during the Second World War. In 1951, it was restored to operation, albeit temporarily, in some parts.

The main line from Novara to Rho was electrified from the timetable change in May 1960. The missing section from Turin to Novara was electrified the following year and inaugurated on 4 June in the presence of the Minister of Transport Giuseppe Spataro, on the occasion of the 100th anniversary of the unification of Italy.

At the beginning of the 2000s, the management of the line passed to Rete Ferroviaria Italiana.

== Features ==
The line is double-track, electrified at 3,000 volts DC and standard-gauge with a length of 153 kilometres (95 mi). Its infrastructure manager, RFI classifies it as a "fundamental line".

The line has five junction stations, Settimo, Chivasso, Santhià, Vercelli and Novara. Lines branch off as follows: from Settimo to Pont Canavese; from Chivasso to Ivrea/Aosta, Asti and Alessandria; from Santhià to Arona and Biella; from Vercelli to Casale and Pavia; and from Novara to Biella, Alessandria/Arona, Domodossola and Varallo Sesia. The railway line is paralleled by the Turin–Milan high-speed railway, which crosses it several times during its journey, with connections at several points, including at: Torino Stura, Settimo, Bianzè, Novara and Rho Fiera. Trains can reach a top speed of 160 km/h on most of the line and between Magenta and Pregnana Milanese the speed limit is 180 km/h.

== Operations ==
The line is used by freight and passenger trains of various categories, which are operated by various companies.

Trenitalia operates the following services each day:

- twenty pairs of fast regional trains between Turin and Milan;
- regional trains on the Novara/Vercelli–Chivasso–Turin/Ivrea route;
- a pair of InterCity services between Turin and Milan;
- two pairs of InterCity Night services between Turin and Reggio Calabria.

In addition six TGV services a day are operated on the Milan–Turin–Paris route;

The Novara–Milan section is also used by line S6 of the Milan suburban railway service, operated by Trenord, while the Chivasso–Turin section is used by line 2 of the Turin metropolitan railway service, operated by Trenitalia.

== See also ==
- List of railway lines in Italy
