= Novi Ligure railway station =

Italian railway station

Novi Ligure
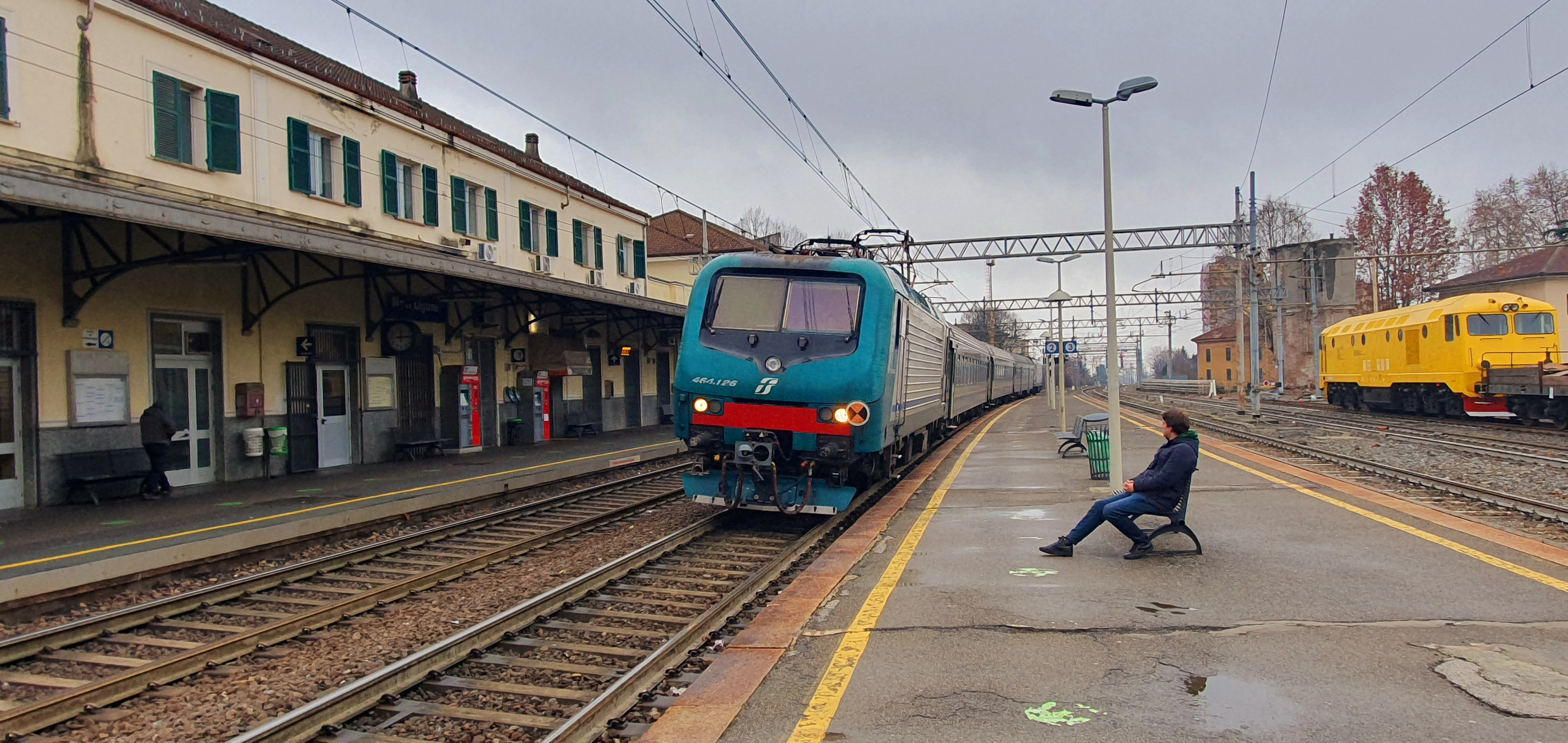
- Novi Ligure station. A passenger train from Turin towards Genoa arrives at Platform 2. A yellow freight locomotive is visible on the right

General information
- Location: Novi Ligure, Province of Alessandria, Piedmont, Italy
- Coordinates: 44°45′45″N 8°47′13″E
- Owner: Rete Ferroviaria Italiana
- Lines: Turin–Genoa railway Tortona to Novi Ligure line
- Platforms: 2
- Tracks: 3
- Train operators: Trenitalia

History
- Opened: 1 January 1850
Location

Novi Ligure railway station (Italian: stazione di Novi Ligure) is a railway station located in the centre of the town of Novi Ligure in the province of Alessandria, in Italy's Piedmont region. The station was opened in 1850 as part of the Turin–Genoa railway. In 1858, the line between Novi Ligure and Tortona was opened. The train services are operated by Trenitalia.

Three tracks are used for passenger services, and there is also a freight yard with several spurs. The station has one side platform, adjacent to the station building, and one island platform connected by a pedestrian underpass. Both platforms are low level. There a passenger drop-off area, taxi stand and local bus stops in front of the station building, which contains a ticket office, a waiting room, a bar and toilets.

All four Novi Ligure local bus routes start and end at the railway station.

== History ==
A 22-km section of the Turin–Genoa railway between Alessandria and Novi Ligure was opened on 1 January 1850; on 10 February 1852 this line was extended to Arquata Scrivia to the east. On 25 January 1858 the connection between Tortona and Novi Ligure was opened. This connection formed, from 1867, a part of the new Milan–Genoa railway. On 1 October 1916, however, a new line between Arquata Scrivia and Tortona was built, making the Milan–Genoa trains bypass Novi Ligure from then on.

== Train services ==
The station is served by Trenitalia trains between Torino Porta Nuova and Genova Piazza Principe, typically once per hour in each direction.

Until 2017, there were also passenger services on the Tortona-Novi Ligure line, but they were suspended during the construction of the Tortona–Genoa high-speed railway. The Tortona-Novi Ligure line reopened in January 2024.

== See also ==
- History of rail transport in Italy
- List of railway stations in Piedmont
- Rail transport in Italy
- Railway stations in Italy
