= Vercelli–Pavia railway =

Railway line between Piedmont and Lombardy, Italy

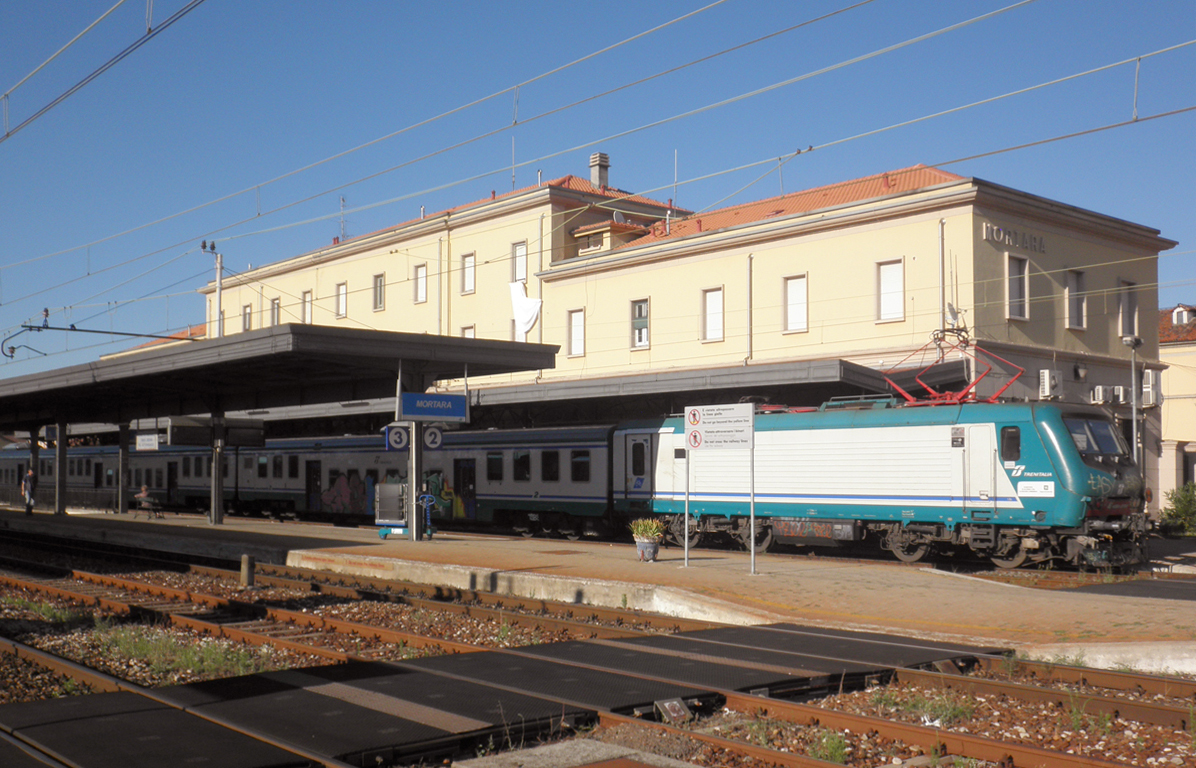
- A train at Mortara station in 2010

Overview
- Status: in use
- Owner: RFI
- Locale: Piedmont and Lombardy, Italy
- Termini: Vercelli; Pavia

Service
- Type: Heavy rail
- Operator(s): Trenord

History
- Opened: February 5, 1883

Technical
- Line length: 67 km (42 mi)
- Track gauge: 1,435 mm (4 ft 8 1/2 in) standard gauge

Route map

The Vercelli–Pavia railway is a railway line between Piedmont and Lombardy, in Italy. It was opened in 1882–1883.

== See also ==
- List of railway lines in Italy
