= Novara railway station =

Railway station in Novara, Italy

Novara
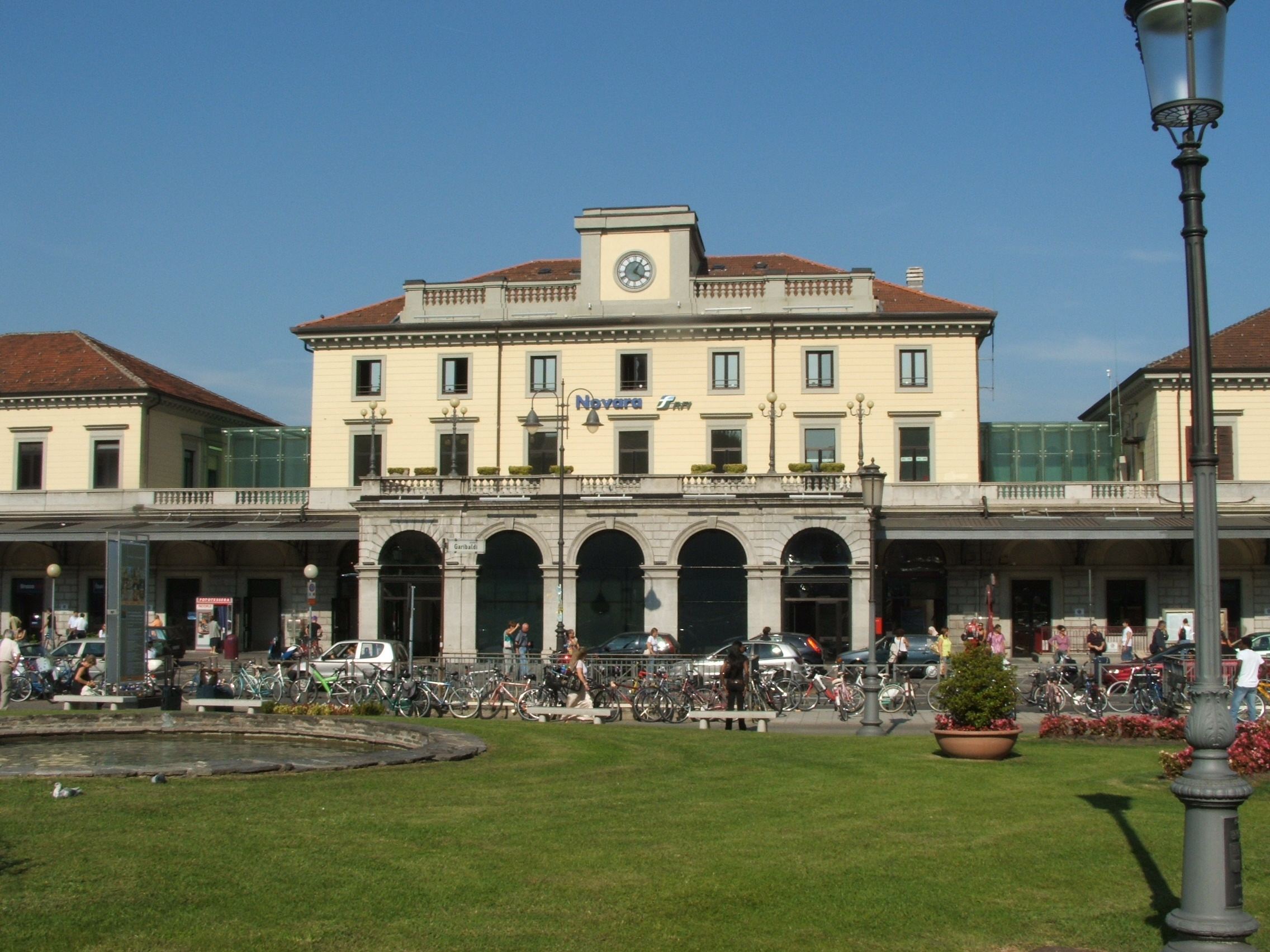
- Main entrance to the passenger building.

General information
- Location: Piazza Garibaldi; 28100 Novara NO; Novara, Novara, Piedmont; Italy
- Coordinates: 45°27′03″N 08°37′31″E
- Operator: Rete Ferroviaria Italiana; Centostazioni
- Lines: Turin–Milan; Arona–Novara; Novara–Alessandria; Biella–Novara; Varallo–Novara; Novara–Gozzano–Domodossola
- Distance: 98.940 km (61.478 mi) from Turin Porta Nuova; 65.528 km (40.717 mi) from Alessandria
- Platforms: 13
- Train operators: Trenitalia, Trenord, SNCF
- Connections: Novara Nord railway station: Regional and interurban buses to Milan Malpensa Airport

Other information
- Classification: Gold

History
- Opened: 3 July 1854; 172 years ago

Services
Preceding station	Trenord	Following station
Terminus	Line S6 (Milan suburban railway service)	Trecate towards Treviglio
Location
- Location within Piedmont Location within Northern Italy Location within Italy

Novara railway station (Italian: Stazione di Novara) is the main station serving the city and comune of Novara, in the Piedmont region of northwestern Italy. Opened in 1854, it forms part of the Turin–Milan and is the origin point of the lines to Arona, to Alessandria, to Biella, Varallo, Domodossola and Luino.

The station is currently managed by Rete Ferroviaria Italiana (RFI). However, the commercial area of the passenger building is managed by Centostazioni. Each of these companies is a subsidiary of Ferrovie dello Stato (FS), Italy's state-owned rail company.

The rain services are operated by Trenitalia, SNCF and Trenord.

A second station, the Novara Nord railway station, is located a short distance away, and serves as the terminus of the Saronno–Novara railway, which is owned by Trenord.

== Location ==
Novara railway station is situated at Piazza Garibaldi, at the northeastern edge of the city centre.

== History ==
The station was opened on 3 July 1854, upon the opening of the Novara–-Mortara portion of the Arona–Alessandria railway.

== Features ==
The passenger station is equipped with fifteen tracks and passing loops, of which thirteen (10 platform and three loops, and 2 north and 1 south) are numbered for passenger service. Track 1 and the tracks of the first three platforms (2-3, 4-4A-5, and 6-6A-6B-7) are served directly from the subway and have a roof, though not for its entire length. The last three tracks are accessible from the platform of the tracks 6 and 7 with a track level crossing. Tracks 3 and 4 serve the Turin–Milan railway, while other tracks are mostly used by trains on the other, terminating, lines.

The goods yard is distinctly separated from the passenger station and is linked to the incoming lines by two lines connected in a triangle, starting from one end of the passenger station. This allows the goods yard to receive goods trains without having to occupy sections of line reserved for passenger services. At the end of the goods yard is the Centro Intermodale Merci (CIM), built at the turn of the twenty-first century, while along the track north of the triangle is the new Novara Nord railway station. Finally, the goods yard is linked with the Treno Alta Velocità (TAV) by a couple of tracks that are bypassed by the FNM line to Novara Nord.

== Passenger and train movements ==
The station has about 9.4 million passenger movements each year, making it the seventh busiest Centostazioni station in terms of passenger movements. There are about 350 trains per day, including any Trenitalia train replacement buses.

Trains stopping at Novara include TGV, Frecciabianca, Intercity Notte and regional trains, along with line S6 on the Milan suburban rail service. The most important domestic destinations of these trains are Turin, Milan and Venice, but passengers also depart for and arrive from other domestic destinations, such as Genoa, Biella and Vercelli. The main international links are with Paris.

Many of the station's passenger movements are arrivals from neighboring cities, with a large presence of students in the morning. However, the predominant component is commuter traffic to Milan, and, to a lesser extent, Turin. This traffic leads to overflowing commuter trains, even though each of them is made up of twelve carriages. Combined with the many and repeated delays, the uncomfortable travelling conditions have led to numerous protest actions, with resonance at the national level.

Goods traffic, which is also significant, is characterized by the presence of the CIM and a related rolling highway to northern Europe. Even the passage of goods trains in transit is not negligible.

== Train services ==
The station is served by the following services:

- High speed services (TGV) Paris - Chambéry - Turin - Milan
- High speed services (Frecciabianca) Turin - Milan - Brescia - Verona - Vicenza - Padua - Venice - Trieste
- Night train (Intercity Notte) Turin - Milan - Parma - Rome - Naples - Salerno
- Night train (Intercity Notte) Turin - Milan - Parma - Reggio Emilia - Florence - Rome - Salerno - Lamezia Terme - Reggio di Calabria
- Historic train (Treno storico) Novara - Varallo Sesia
- Express services (Regionale Veloce) Turin - Chivasso – Vercelli – Novara – Milan
- Regional services (Treno regionale) Chivasso - Vercelli - Novara
- Regional services (Treno regionale) Biella San Paolo - Novara
- Regional services (Treno regionale) Domodossola - Premosello-Chiovenda - Omegna - Borgomanero - Novara
- Regional services (Treno regionale) Arona - Oleggio - Novara
- Regional services (Treno regionale) Novara - Mortara - Valenza - Alessandria
- Milan Metropolitan services (S6) Novara - Milan - Treviglio

== See also ==
- History of rail transport in Italy
- List of railway stations in Piedmont
- Rail transport in Italy
- Railway stations in Italy
