= Alessandria–Novara–Arona railway =

Railway line in Italy

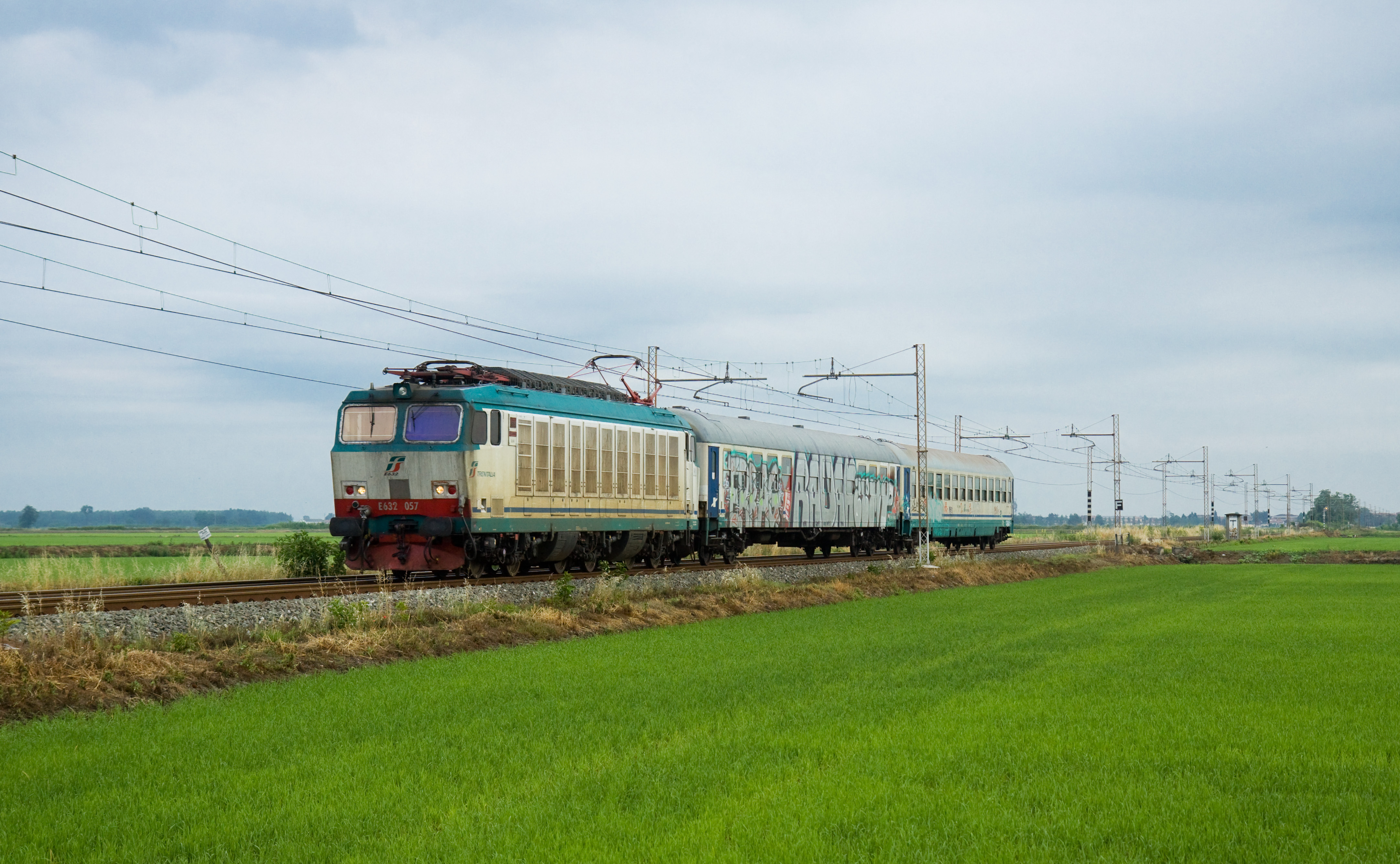

Overview
- Status: in use
- Owner: RFI
- Locale: Lombardy and Piedmont, Italy
- Termini: Novara; Alessandria

Service
- Type: Heavy rail
- Operator(s): Trenitalia, Trenord

History
- Opened: 1854

Technical
- Line length: 67 km (42 mi)
- Number of tracks: 2
- Track gauge: 1,435 mm (4 ft 8 1/2 in) standard gauge
- Electrification: 3 kV DC
- Operating speed: 135 km/h (84 mph)

The Alessandria–Novara–Arona railway is a railway line in Italy that connects Alessandria to Arona on Lake Maggiore, passing through Novara.

The management of the infrastructure is the responsibility of RFI SpA, a subsidiary of Ferrovie dello Stato, which classifies the line as complementary.

== History ==
Section	Opening
Alessandria-Mortara	5 June 1854
Mortara-Novara	3 July 1854
Novara-Arona	14 June 1855

A project involving the building of a railway between Alessandria, Novara and Lake Maggiore was conceived in the period of maximum enthusiasm for construction by the Kingdom of Sardinia which under the Cavour Government had quickly built the Turin–Genoa and Turin–Cuneo railways. The line itself was conceived as a long branch of the Turin–Genoa line in order to improve the connections between Genoa and Switzerland in competition with river traffic on the Ticino.

The Royal Licenses of 1845, which laid the foundations for the construction of the railways of the Sardinian States, authorised the construction of a line that branched off from Alessandria station to reach the shore of Lake Maggiore. Work began under the jurisdiction of the state company in the late 1840s and proceeded slowly, as Piedmont waited a long time for a response from the Swiss cantons in regard to the construction of a tunnel under the Lukmanier Pass. Future decisions on the establishment of the railway to the port of Arona or on an alternative link to Locarno depended on it. In 1853, in the absence of certainty about the development of the Swiss network, it was decided to end the line at Arona and to organise ferries to Locarno.

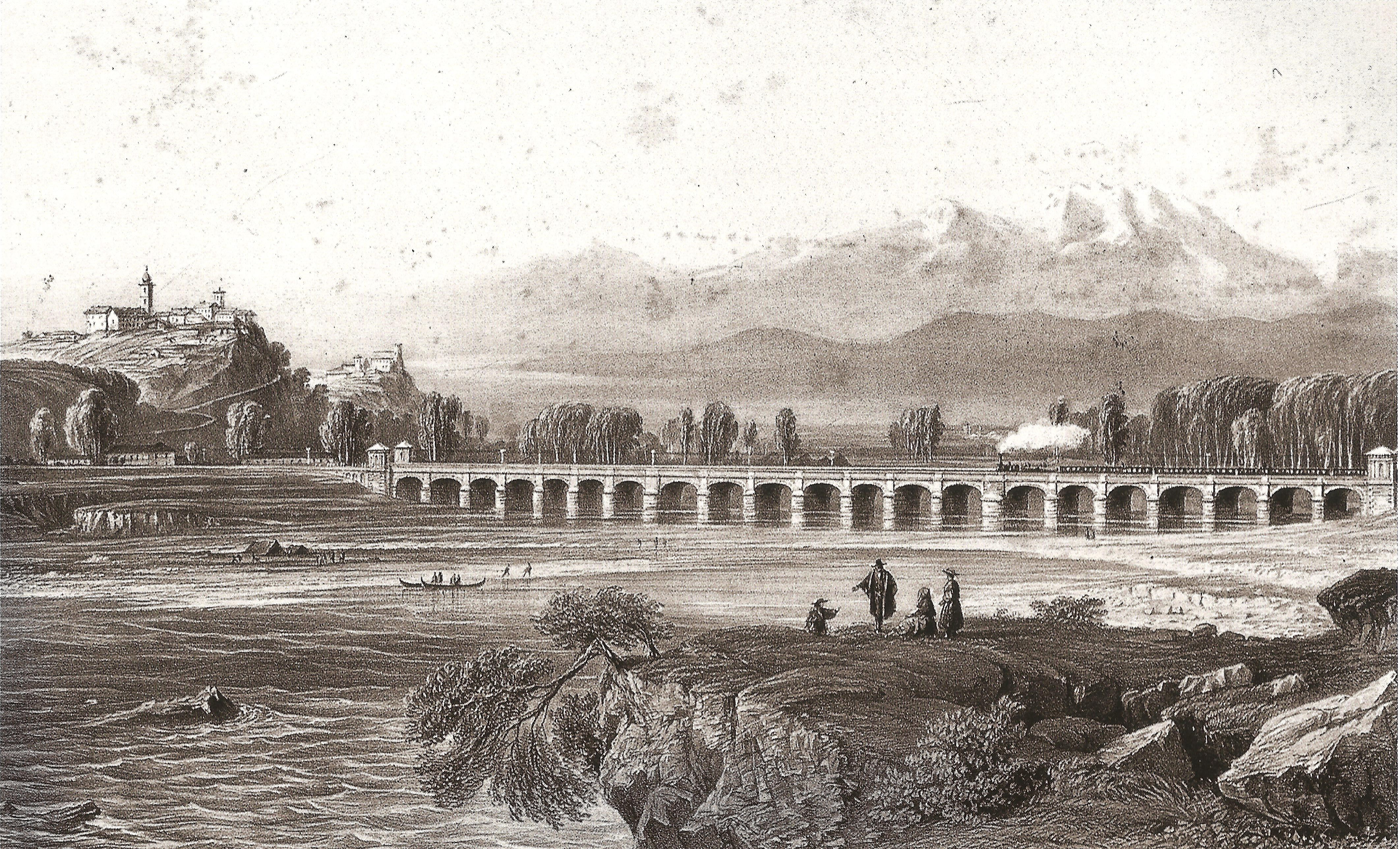
Railway bridge over the Po near Valenza

The first section opened between Alessandria railway station and Mortara on 5 June 1854. Novara was reached the following month (3 July), while the rest of the line to the old station on the lake at Arona was opened on 14 June 1855.

The Alessandria–Arona section was inaugurated on the following Sunday, 17 June, in the presence of Cavour, Rattazzi, Durando and Paleocapa. Vittorio Emanuele II, who was mourning the death of his youngest son, was represented by the Prince of Carignano. On that day, the waters of the full lake lapped the railway.

In 1859, for the first time in history, a railway was used for military operations: the Alessandria–Novara line was used for the speedy transport of Piedmontese troops between Casale and Novara, surprising the Austrian troops at the Battle of Magenta.

Under the law of 14 May 1865, no. 2279, the ownership of the lines of the Ferrovie dello Stato Piemontese (Piedmontese State Railways), including the Arona–Alessandria railway, was sold to the Società per le strade ferrate dell'Alta Italia (SFAI) of the Südbahn (Southern Railway) group. Ten years later, with the redemption of the SFAI property under the Basel Agreement, the infrastructure returned to the Italian state, while its operation was temporarily assigned to the private railway company. The Conventions of 1885 resolved the provisional situation by incorporating the state lines west of Milan in the Rete Mediterranea, under a sixty-year concession to the Società per le Strade Ferrate del Mediterraneo.

Following the nationalisation of the railways in 1905, the line was then operated by Ferrovie dello Stato. The doubling of the track between Mortara and Novara was completed on 2 April 1909.

Electrification at 3 kV AC was activated on 2 May 1960. The electrification of the line, part of the route from Switzerland to the Port of Genoa, was carried out under an Italo-Swiss convention for improving international lines agreed in 1955.

== Features ==
The line is single track on the section between Arona and Vignale and double track between the latter and Alessandria. The line is 1,435 mm (4 ft 8 1/2 in) standard gauge.

The line is electrified at 3,000 volts DC.

== Operations ==
From the point of view of the passenger service, the line is separated into two sections, both of which are operated by regional services: Arona–Novara and Novara–Alessandria.

== See also ==
- List of railway lines in Italy
