= Viareggio railway station =

Railway station in Viareggio, Italy

Viareggio
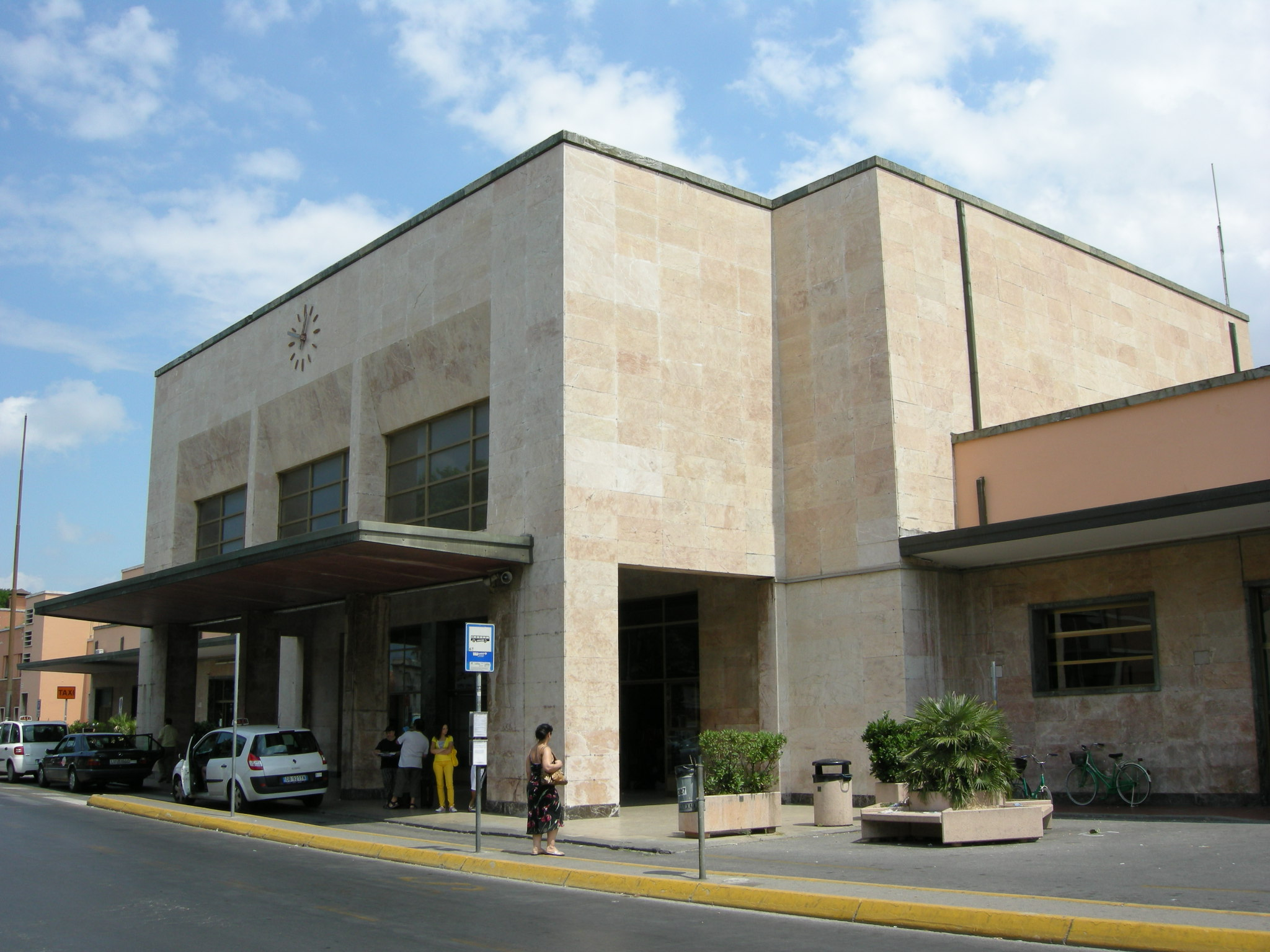
- View of the passenger building.

General information
- Location: Piazzale Dante Alighieri; 55049 Viareggio LU; Viareggio, Lucca, Tuscany; Italy
- Coordinates: 43°52′26″N 10°15′10″E
- Operator: Rete Ferroviaria Italiana
- Lines: Pisa–La Spezia–Genova; Viareggio–Florence
- Distance: 22.00 km (13.67 mi) from Pisa Centrale
- Train operators: Trenitalia
- Connections: Urban and suburban buses

Other information
- Classification: Gold

History
- Opened: 13 June 1936; 90 years ago
Location
- Location within Tuscany Location within Italy

Viareggio railway station (Italian: Stazione di Viareggio) serves the city and comune of Viareggio, in the region of Tuscany, central Italy. Opened in 1936, it forms part of the Pisa–La Spezia–Genoa railway, and is also a junction for a regional line to Florence.

The station is currently managed by Rete Ferroviaria Italiana (RFI). Train services to and from the station are operated by Trenitalia. Each of these companies is a subsidiary of Ferrovie dello Stato (FS), Italy's state-owned rail company.

Due to its position, the station is the most significant one in the Province of Lucca. It is an important junction connecting Pisa, Livorno and Rome with La Spezia, Genoa, Parma and Milan, and providing interchange for passengers to and from all of these cities with trains to and from Lucca, Florence and the Garfagnana. Its catchment area includes much of the Versilia.

== Location ==
Viareggio railway station is situated in Piazzale Dante Alighieri, at the western edge of the city centre.

== History ==
The original Viareggio station was opened in 1861. By the end of the nineteenth century, it was inadequate for the role of trade and tourism that the city was taking at that time. As early as 1889, the comune of Viareggio had proposed the construction of a new, more central, facility, that could provide "more prestige and dignity to the city."

The present station was opened on 13 June 1936, in the presence of Minister of Communications Antonio Stefano Benni. The passenger building was designed by the prolific railway station architect Roberto Narducci, while its construction was entrusted to the company "Ignesti Federico e Figli".

== Derailment in 2009 ==
On 29 June 2009, shortly before midnight, freight train no. 50 325 from Trecate to Gricignano derailed near the station, causing the explosion of a tank carrying LPG, the collapse of some houses nearby and the deaths of 32 people.

The section of line between Forte dei Marmi-Seravezza-Querceta and Pisa San Rossore was closed to ordinary traffic until 3 July 2009, when repairs were completed to track damaged by the explosion.

== Features ==
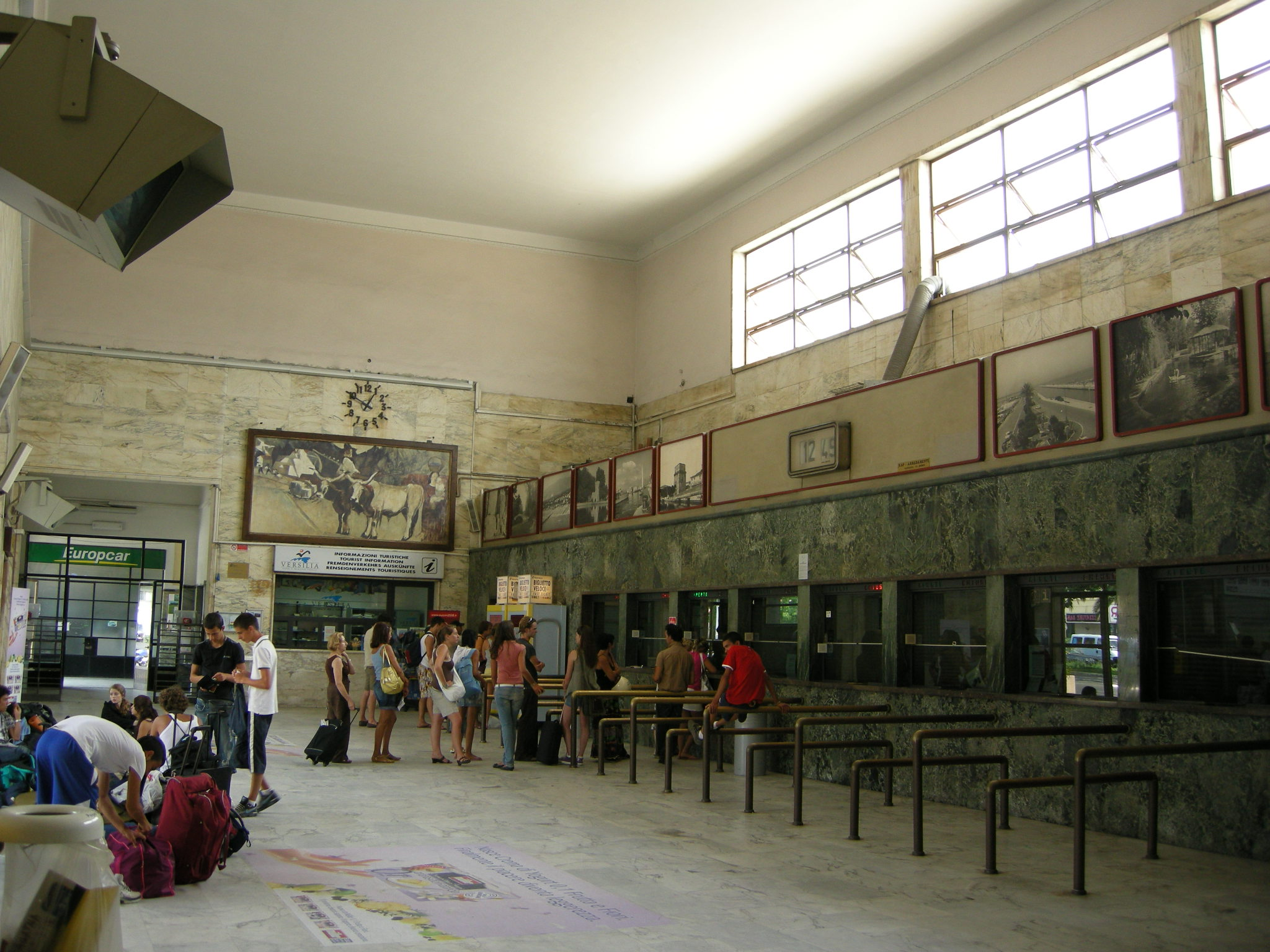
Inside the booking hall.

The passenger building has a ticket counter, ticket machines, a police station, a bar, and a kiosk. In the square in front of the building is a bus stop for buses and taxis. The lobby contains numerous black and white photographs of Viareggio's prominent locations. They were taken by Mario Cimoli, stationmaster and noted outdoor photographer, and member of the partisans in World War II.

The station yard has eight loop tracks. Originally there were ten, but two of them were removed in the aftermath of the 2009 derailment. The four platforms at the station are covered by canopies and connected with each other by a pedestrian underpass. The station also has many monitors showing in real time where and when trains are leaving and arriving.

Track 1 is used for terminating trains, and Track 2 is for passing freight trains. Track 3 is used by through trains from Pisa Centrale, and Track 4 by direct trains to Pisa. Tracks 5 and 6 are used as the terminus of the Viareggio–Florence railway via Lucca, and Tracks 7 and 8 as a terminus for trains to and from Lucca.

About 1 kilometre (0.62 mi) towards Pisa is the Viareggio Scalo goods yard, now disused.

== Passenger and train movements ==
The station is served by numerous trains: regional, express, InterCity and even a pair of Eurostar City trains.

== Interchange ==
There is interchange at the station with urban and suburban bus lines.

== See also ==
- History of rail transport in Italy
- List of railway stations in Tuscany
- Rail transport in Italy
- Railway stations in Italy
