= Framura railway station =

Railway station in Italy

Framura
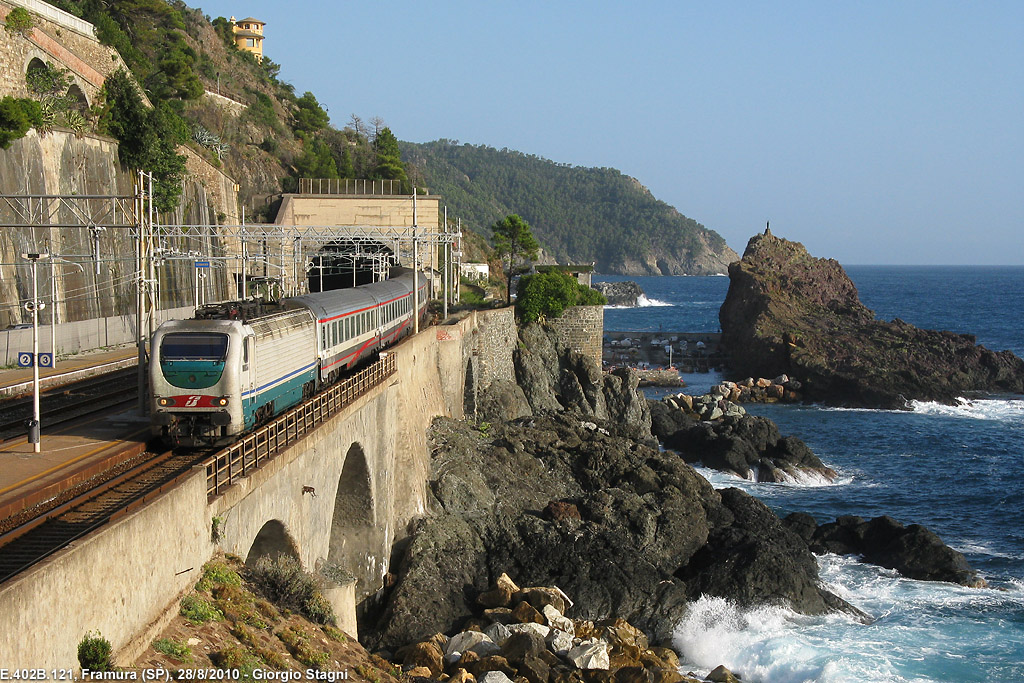
- Framura railway station

General information
- Location: Framura; Framura, La Spezia, Liguria; Italy
- Coordinates: 44°12′06″N 9°33′18″E
- Operator: Rete Ferroviaria Italiana
- Line: Pisa–La Spezia–Genoa railway (Trenitalia)
- Platforms: 3
- Train operators: Trenitalia

Other information
- Classification: Silver

History
- Opened: 1874
Location
- Location within Liguria Location within Northern Italy Location within Italy

Framura (Italian: Stazione di Framura) is a railway station in the Italian town of Framura, in the Province of La Spezia, Liguria. The station lies on the Pisa–La Spezia–Genoa railway. The train services are operated by Trenitalia.

== Train services ==
The station is served by the following service(s):

- Regional services (Treno regionale) Ventimiglia - Savona - Genoa - Sestri Levante - La Spezia - San Stefano di Magra
- Regional services (Treno regionale) Novi Ligure - Genoa - Sestri Levante - La Spezia - San Stefano di Magra
- Regional services (Treno regionale) Milan - Genoa - Sestri Levante - La Spezia
- Regional services (Treno regionale) Turin - Alessandria - Genoa - Sestri Levante - La Spezia

== See also ==
- Railway stations in Italy
- List of railway stations in Liguria
- Rail transport in Italy
- History of rail transport in Italy
