= Pisa Centrale railway station =

Railway station in Pisa, Italy

Pisa Centrale
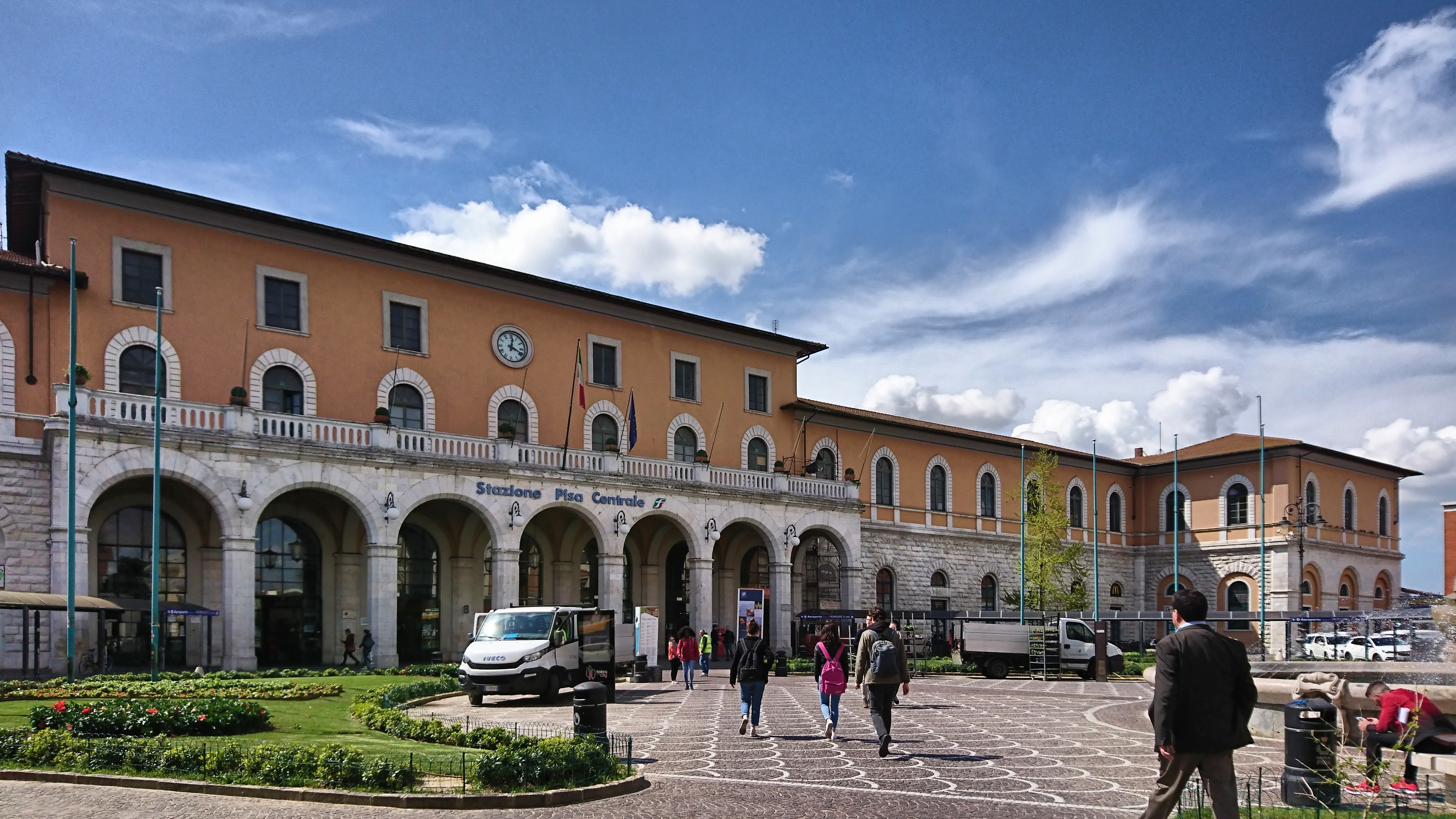
- Pisa Centrale station building.

General information
- Location: Piazza della Stazione; 56125 Pisa; Italy
- Coordinates: 43°42′30″N 10°23′54″E
- Owner: Rete Ferroviaria Italiana
- Operator: Centostazioni
- Lines: Pisa–Livorno–Rome; Pisa–La Spezia–Genoa; Pisa–Florence; Lucca–Pisa; Pisa-Collesalvetti-Vada (freight only)
- Distance: 80.848 km (50.237 mi) from Firenze Santa Maria Novella
- Platforms: 16

Other information
- IATA code: PSA
Location
- Location within Tuscany Location within Italy

Pisa Centrale railway station (Italian: Stazione di Pisa Centrale) is the central station of the Italian city of Pisa, the first station of the city in terms of passengers, before Pisa San Rossore railway station. The station is one of the major railway junctions of Tuscany. Lines serving the station include three long-distance lines: the Pisa–Livorno–Rome line, the Pisa–La Spezia–Genoa line and the Pisa–Florence line. Local services operate on the Lucca–Pisa line. The line from Pisa to Vada via Collesalvetti, which was closed from 1992 to 2000, is now only open for freight traffic.

== History ==
Pisa Centrale station was constructed following the implementation of a development plan approved on 23 March 1871. Its building led to the conversion of the old Leopolda station (inaugurated in 1844) into a freight yard, which functioned until 1929, when it was closed permanently. The whole Pisa Centrale complex was severely damaged during World War II and rebuilt with some changes to the original design.

== Station ==
The passenger station building is large and offers numerous services such as domestic and international ticketing, waiting room, baggage storage, three bars, pizzerias, fast food, cafeterias, three newsagents, tobacconist, pharmacy and other shops. Inside the station there are 16 platforms equipped with elevators and connected by two subways. Other tracks are used for storing unused carriages. Since December 2008 the station has been equipped with a computerised control centre to control the movement of rail traffic.

== Passengers and services ==
The station is used by approximately 15 million passenger movements, both tourists and commuters. Trains of all types stop at the station, including Inter-city, Frecciargento and Frecciabianca. The main destinations are Florence, Genoa, Rome, Naples, Livorno, Lucca, La Spezia and Turin.

== Interchange ==
The Pisa Mover to Pisa Airport, coaches to Collesalvetti, Cecina, Florence, Reggio Calabria and urban bus lines operate from the front of the station. the main interurban bus station is also located nearby.

== See also ==
- Pisa Aeroporto railway station
- Pisa San Rossore railway station
- History of rail transport in Italy
- List of railway stations in Tuscany
- Rail transport in Italy
- Railway stations in Italy
