= Genoa–Pisa railway =

Railway line in Italy

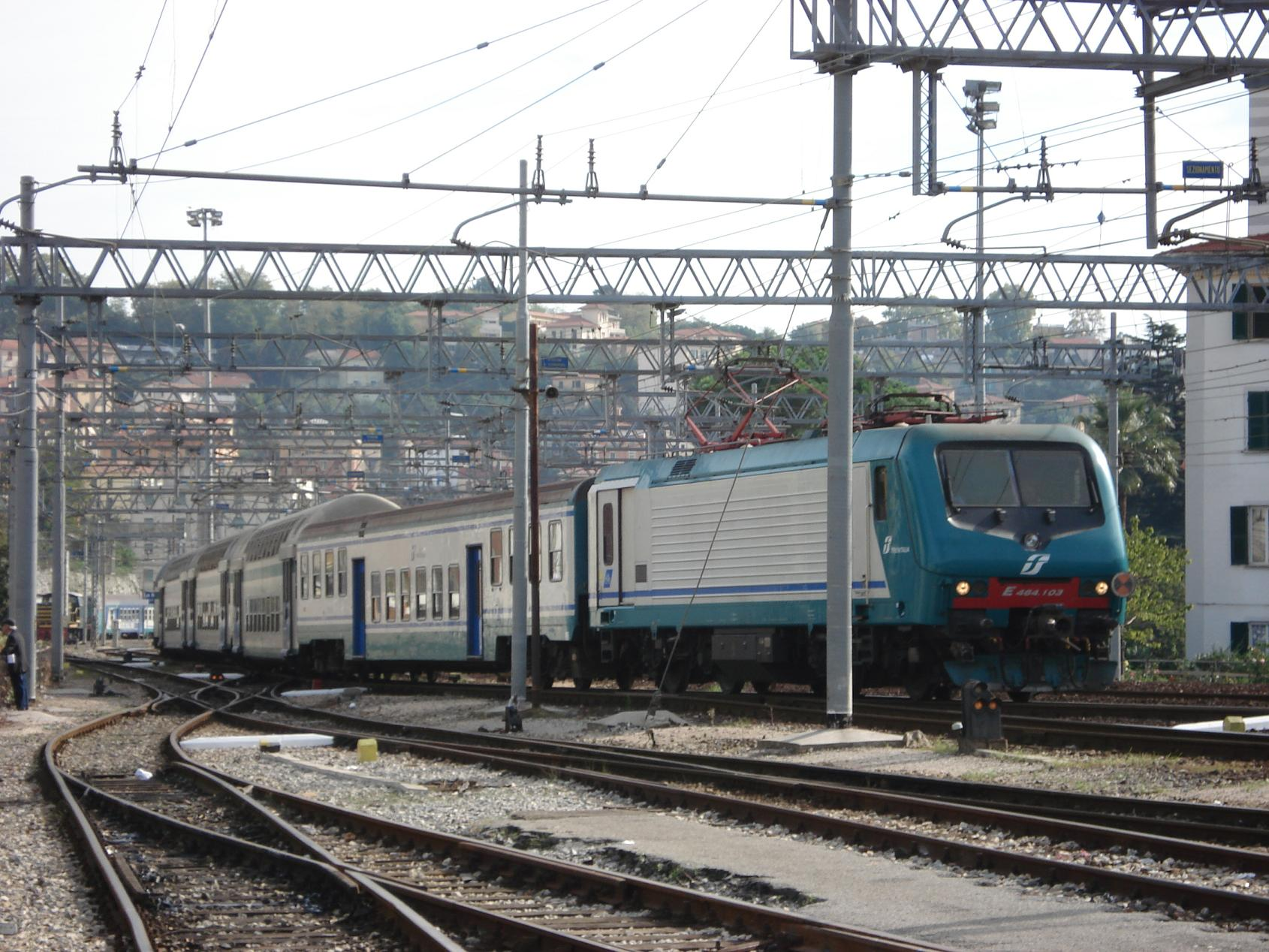
- A train at La Spezia Centrale station

Overview
- Owner: RFI

Service
- Operator(s): Trenitalia

History
- Opened: 1861–1874

Technical
- Line length: 165 km (103 mi)
- Track gauge: 1,435 mm (4 ft 8 1/2 in) standard gauge
- Electrification: 3000 V DC

The Genoa–Pisa railway is one of the trunk lines of the Italian railway network. It runs along the Ligurian coast from Genoa to Pisa through the Riviera di Levante and the Versilia. It passes through the cities of Massa, Carrara and La Spezia. South of Pisa the Pisa–Rome line continues along the Tyrrhenian coast to Rome. The line is double track and is fully electrified at 3,000 V DC. Passenger traffic is managed by Trenitalia.

== History ==
The line was created by the connection of two separate projects. The first, between Pisa and Massa, was an extension of the existing line from Pisa; the second was what was called the Ligurian railway.

=== Tuscan railway ===
Section	Opened
Pisa (Porta Nuova station)–Viareggio	15 April 1861
Pisa (Porta Nuova station)–Pisa (Leopolda station)	10 December 1861
Viareggio–Pietrasanta	12 December 1861
Pietrasanta–Seravezza	1 February 1862
Serravezza–Massa	1 November 1862
Massa–Sarzana	15 May 1863
Sarzana–La Spezia	4 August 1864
Genoa (Brignole station)–Chiavari	23 November 1868
Chiavari–Sestri Levante	25 April 1870
Genoa (Principe station)–Genoa (Brignole station)	25 July 1872
Sestri Levante–La Spezia	24 October 1874

On 15 April 1861, the Livornese Railway Company (Italian: Società delle Ferrovie Livornesi) opened the first 19 kilometre section between Pisa Porta Nuova station (now called Pisa San Rossore) and Viareggio (later called Viareggio Scalo). In the following December this was followed by a connection in the south with Pisa Centrale station and in the north a ten kilometre section from Viareggio to Pietrasanta. In 1862 two further sections were opened: on 1 February 3.5 kilometres between Pietrasanta and Seravezza and on 1 November seven kilometres between Seravezza and Massa.

In 1865, the Livornese Railway Company was absorbed by other companies and the Florence–Pistoia–Pisa and the Pisa–Massa–La Spezia lines were transferred to the Società per le Strade Ferrate Romane (Roman Railways). In 1869 the Roman Railways transferred them to the Società per le strade ferrate dell'Alta Italia (Upper Italian Railways).

=== Ligurian railway ===
The project for a Ligurian railway that would connect Ventimiglia with Massa (thus connecting the existing railways of central Italy) was agreed by a royal decree on 27 October 1860 but its realisation, because of the rugged Ligurian coast, proved the most difficult and costly project of the period. This line was built initially by the state railway of the Kingdom of Sardinia (Piedmont), but the line was assigned to the Upper Italian Railways on its establishment in 1865.

The first section of the project, 17 kilometre between Massa and Sarzana was opened on 15 May 1863 and was followed by the more difficult Sarzana–Vezzano Ligure–La Spezia section on 4 August 1864. On 23 November 1868, the first part of the northern end of the line was opened as the 36 kilometre section between Genova Brignole and Chiavari. This was followed by the extension to Sestri Levante on 25 April 1870.

On 25 July 1872 with the opening of the connecting tunnel between Genova Brignole and Genova Piazza Principe, the section of line to Sestri Levante was no longer isolated and was connected over the Apennines but especially to the line to Ventimiglia, which had been completed on 25 January 1872.

=== Sestri Levante–La Spezia ===
This was the most difficult section of the entire project. The railway had to run for long distances next to the sea and follow the twists of the coast to minimise the number and length of tunnels. In addition the bad weather of the winter of 1872 caused landslides, which forced changes to be made to the route during construction. Furthermore, since materials had to be transported by sea because long stretches of coastline were inaccessible by land, work was delayed by violent storms.

Finally on 24 July 1874 the line was opened to traffic. This stretch of line was truly revolutionary because it ended the isolation of small towns of the eastern Italian Riviera (the Riviera di Levante), including the famous Cinque Terre villages, which finally had a permanent link with the rest of the world. This stretch included 51 tunnels totalling over 28 kilometres in a total length of 44 kilometres and 23 bridges with a total length of nearly a kilometre. Because of the difficult topography of the area and the harsh conditions encountered during construction, the line had been built as a single track. Duplication was completed in 1971 with the opening of the last section between Framura and Monterosso, which included the new Levanto station.

The Mediterranean Network took over the line in 1885. In 1905 Ferrovie dello Stato (FS) was established and took over the line along with most other standard gauge railways in Italy.

=== Electrification ===
The Genoa-La Spezia line was electrified in two phases:

- Genoa–Sestri Levante was electrified with the three-phase system (3,700 V at 16.7 Hz) in May 1925 and converted to the 3,000 V DC system in February 1948.
- Sestri Levante–La Spezia was electrified with three-phase system in April 1926 and then converted to 3,000 V DC in April 1947.

FS had started the conversion of its lines to DC in 1928. The electrification of the line was badly damaged during World War II and as a result it was rebuilt as a DC line.

== Features ==
Operations are managed and controlled by the Sistema di Comando e Controllo ("command and control system"—SCC, an Italian version of centralized traffic control) of the Rete Ferroviaria Italiana, the subsidiary of the Ferrovie dello Stato group that is responsible for the management of the infrastructure, which supervises the rail traffic from the operations centre in Pisa for the section that runs from Civitavecchia to Sestri Levante (about 420 km) and from the operations centre of Genova Teglia for the section from Sestri Levante to the node of Genoa.

=== Route ===
Leaving Genova Brignole station, the railway runs through the eastern part of the city of Genoa, which it leaves at the former Sant'Ilario station. The landscape, characterised by the passage between villas, coast and cliffs, remains almost unchanged along the whole of the Golfo Paradiso as far as Camogli-San Fruttuoso.

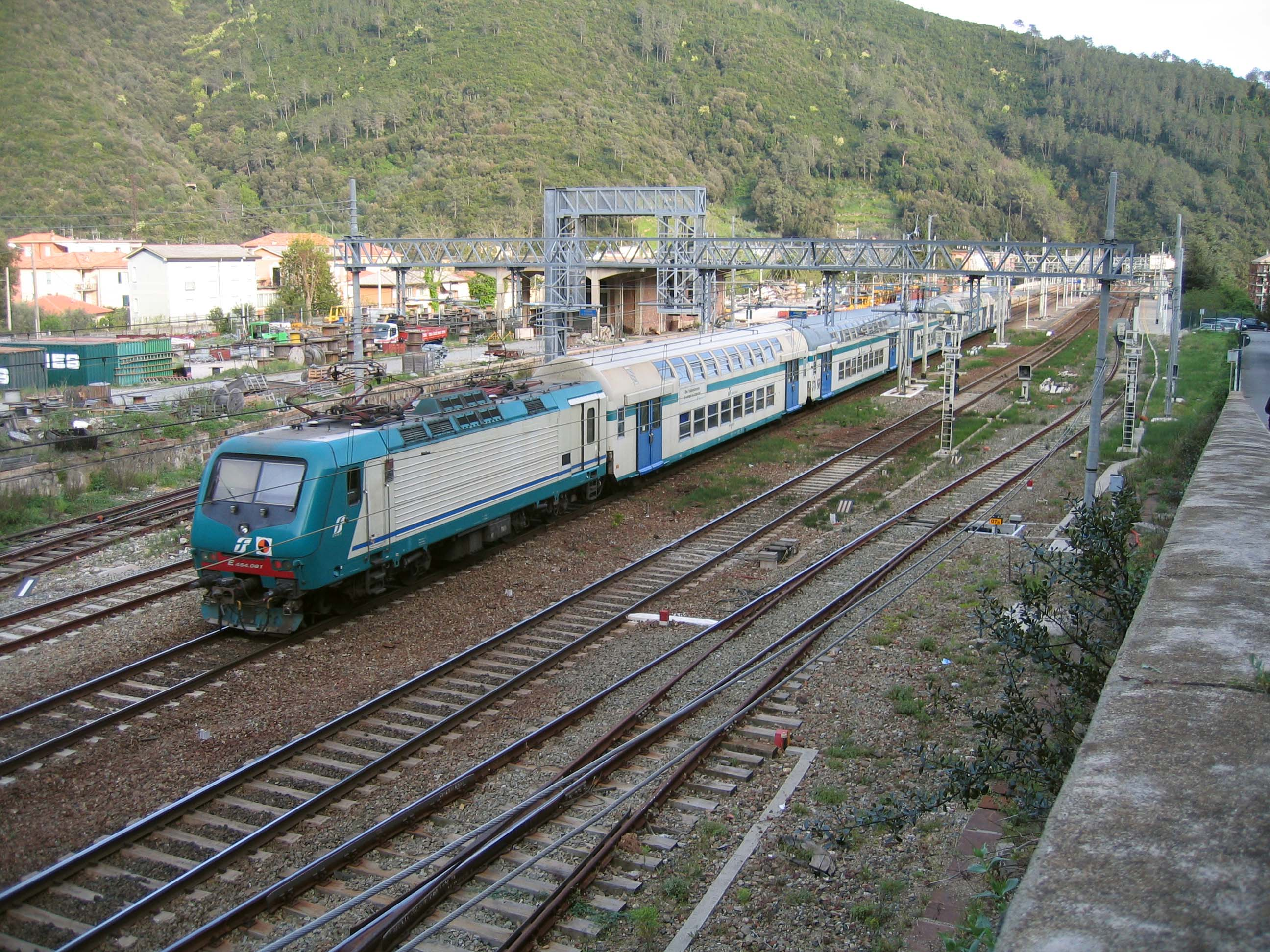
Region train running to Deiva Marina

After crossing the promontory of Portofino, the line follows the Gulf of Tigullio, serving the tourist resorts from Santa Margherita Ligure to Riva Trigoso. This is the beginning of the Ligurian section, which is authorised for operations at higher speeds since the doubling of the line in recent times.

The line then crosses the localities from Moneglia to Monterosso, which is at the beginning of the Cinque Terre section, noted for its long tunnels and sudden glimpses of the Ligurian Sea, picturesque villages and sheer cliffs.

The landscape changes radically after La Spezia Centrale railway station and the line goes inland, reaching, after passing through junctions with a line to the port and the line to Parma, the plain of Luni, the last extension of Liguria.

In Tuscany, the line runs through the provinces of Massa and Carrara and Lucca, remaining almost at the centre of the plain formed over the centuries between the chain of the Apuan Alps and the coast. In this section there were once many crossings and junctions with the extensive network of interurban tramways that included the Carrara-Marina di Carrara tramway, the Massa tramway, the so-called Tranvia litoranea di Viareggio (Viareggio coastal tramway) and the Viareggio-Camaiore tramway.

After reaching Viareggio, the line passes through the junction with the line to Lucca and Florence, and reaches the Serchio river. It now enters the Pisan plain and arrives at Pisa San Rossore. This has an atypical layout for a passenger station as it is arranged in the triangle formed by the branch line of the railway to Lucca. During the construction of a building that was to have housed a new electronic control centre, which was subsequently moved to another location, the remains of an ancient Roman port were found. The famous Piazza dei Miracoli, with its leaning tower is not far away. A shed that housed the royal train when the Italian king resided at the San Rossore estate still exists to the north of the station. It is now used for the storage of material for the railway equipment factory of the CEMES company.

The railway viaduct over the Arno comes shortly before the end of the line at Pisa Centrale station.

=== Abandoned single-track lines ===
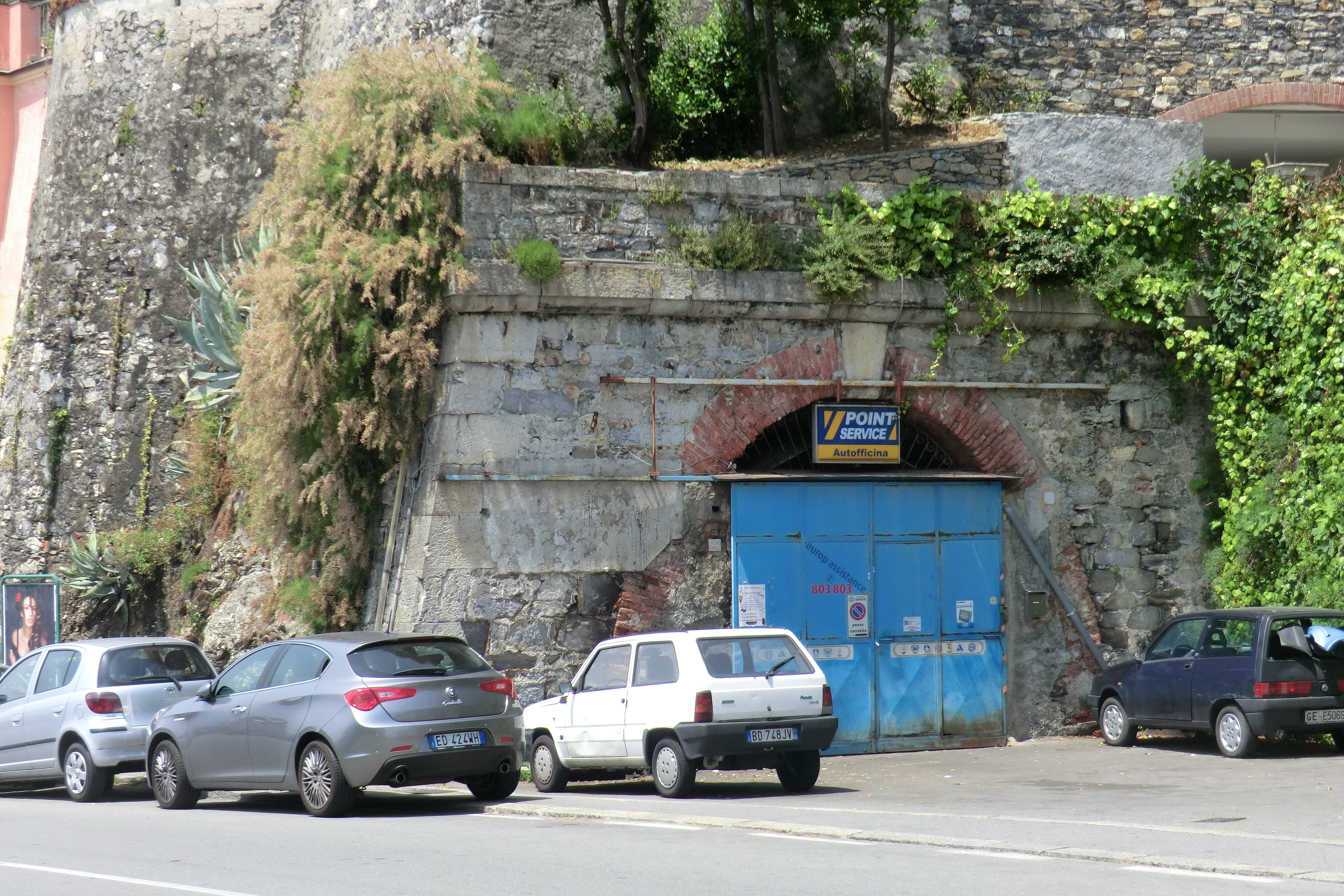
Genova Quinto: the remains of the railway tunnel in Via Gianelli

There remain several vestiges of disused sections of line as a result of the doubling carried out in Genoa in the 1910s and on the Sestri Levante–La Spezia section starting in the 1930s.

In Genoa, remains of a portion of the bridge over the Vernazza river at Sturla and a tunnel mouth next to the Via Gianelli at Quinto al Mare are still visible.

The section between Deiva Marina and Riva Trigoso was converted into a one-lane road, which is now operated in alternate directions, controlled by traffic lights; two sections of the Maremonti cycle path were built on the old railway tracks between Levanto and Bonassola and between Bonassola and Framura station.

== Traffic ==
Since its opening, the Genoa–Pisa railway carried substantial traffic as it is a main line connecting Liguria and Piedmont, with Tuscany, Lombardy and southern Italy.

=== Long-distance services ===
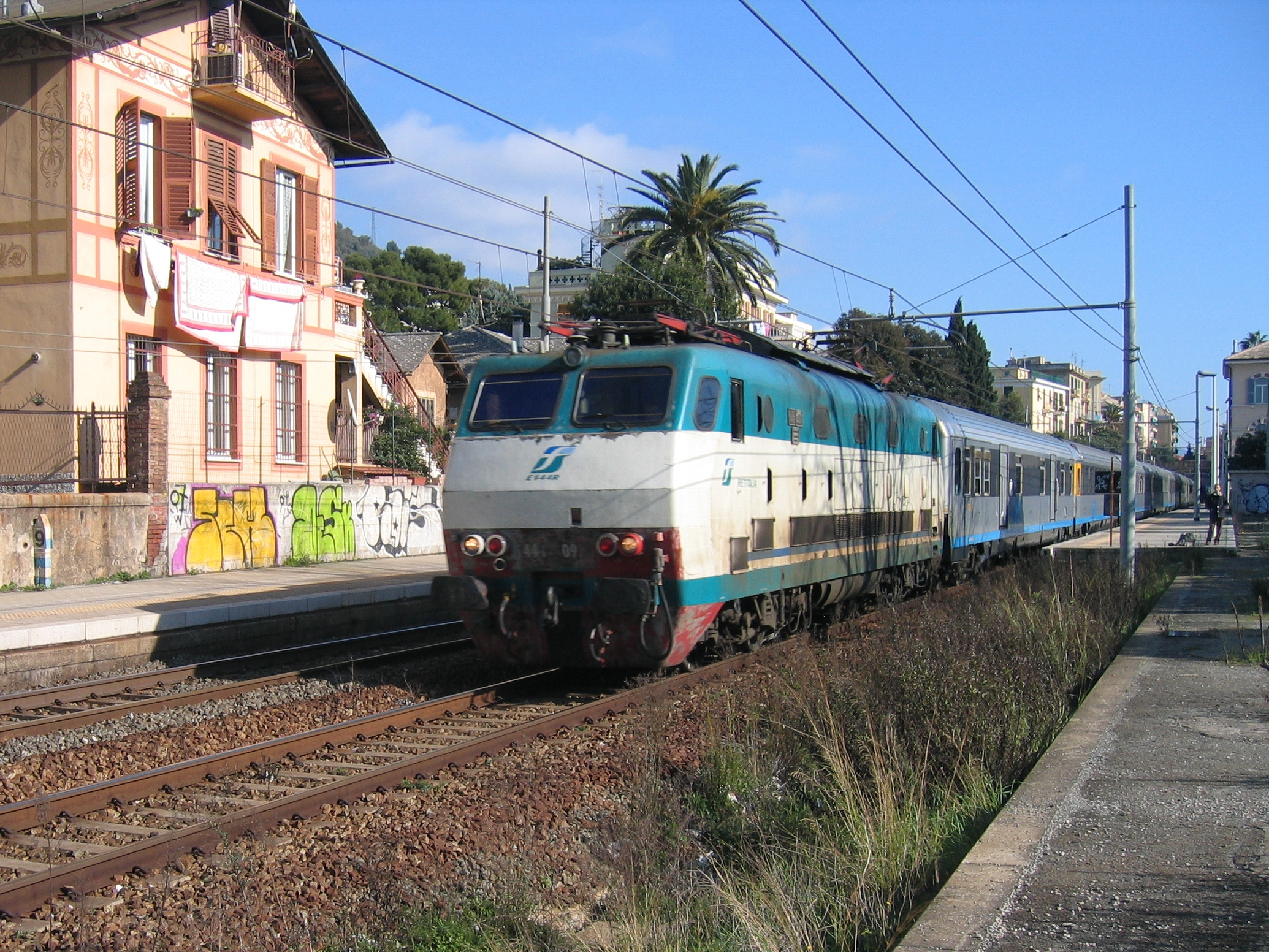
Cisalpino EC train passing through Genova Quinto in 2007

Traditionally served by the major Turin–Rome express services, the Genoa–Pisa railway has been used by both regular services and seasonal and tourist trains running over the passes connecting to France and Switzerland. The most prestigious trains included the Palatino express with beds and couchettes, the Tirreno express and the Genova Sprint, first operated with ALe 601 electric multiple units and later with ETR 300 Settebello sets.

In 1989, the introduction of a new timetable by FS led to the establishment of a series of Intercity trains on the line, which led to the reduction of direct services running beyond Rome.

In 2010, the line was used by the first private long-distance trains, operated by the Arenaways company, which then went bankrupt.

=== Regional services ===
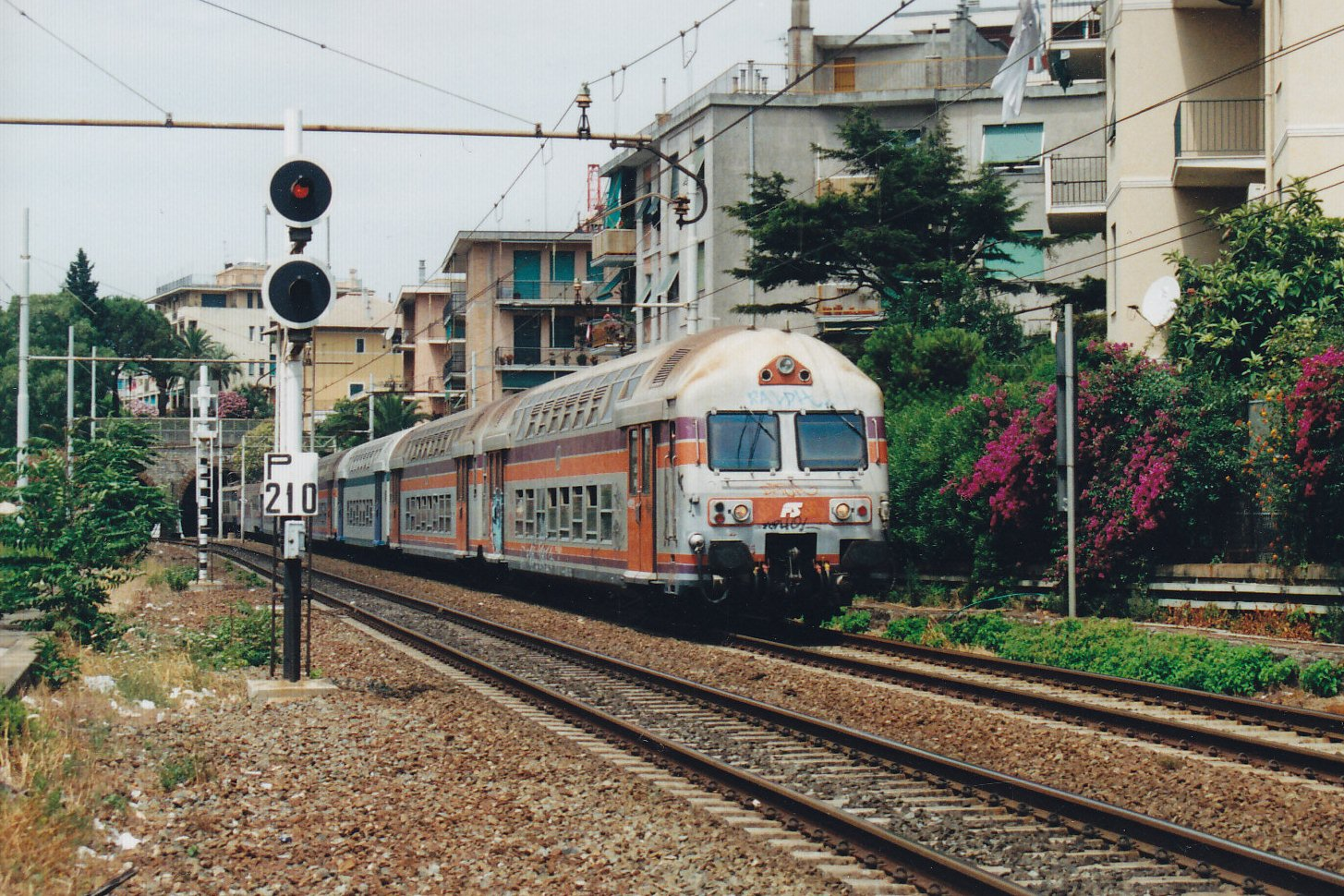
The first double-decker carriages in Liguria were put into service to meet the high demand

The particular locations of the coastal centres, particularly in the Ligurian area, favoured the establishment of local services for the connection of the countryside and hamlets.

These services proved to be particularly valuable both in the city of Genoa, thanks to the presence of numerous toll booths and stops, and, in the Cinque Terre, due to the lack of roads.

After Italian reform resulted in the transfer of responsibility for local transport to the regions, regional rail services were established as two main service groups, both carried out by Trenitalia:

- regional suburban trains that centre on Genoa and have as their main termini Genova Nervi and Recco, regional trains that end in Sestri Levante, fast regional trains on the Genoa–La Spezia route and regional trains running between Sestri Levante and La Spezia (serving the Cinque Terre) as part of the service contract with the Ligurian region;
- regional trains on the La Spezia–Pisa, La Spezia–Florence and Pontremoli–Florence (from the Parma–La Spezia line) routes, as part of a service contract with the Tuscany region ("Memorario" services). Some services from Milan or Bergamo (formerly the Freccia della Versilia—"arrow of Versilia"—service) towards Pisa are added to these, always running over the Parma–La Spezia line.

== See also ==
- List of railway lines in Italy
