= FS Class E.220 =

Italian electric locomotive

FS class E.220
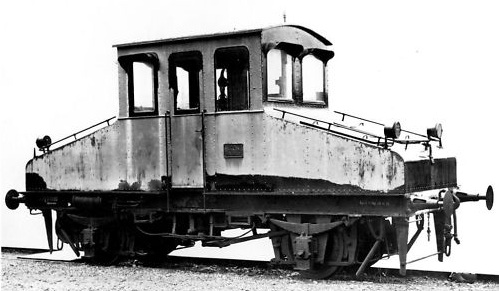
Type and origin
- Power type: Electric
- Builder: Carminati & Toselli and General Electric
- Build date: 1912
- Total produced: 1
Specifications
- Configuration
  - Whyte: 4wRE
  - AAR: B
  - UIC: Bo
- Gauge: 1,435 mm (4 ft 8 1/2 in) standard gauge
- Wheel diameter: 980 mm (38.58 in)
- Length: 8.15 m (26 ft 8 7/8 in)
- Loco weight: 27.2 t (26.8 long tons; 30.0 short tons)
- Electric system/s: 650 V DC third rail
- Current pickup: Contact shoe
- Traction motors: DC
Performance figures
- Maximum speed: 50 km/h (31 mph)
- Power output: 220 kW (300 hp) (1 hour); 150 kW (200 hp) (continuous)

FS Class E.220 was a two-axle electric locomotive, powered by a third rail, built for operation on the Varese line of the Italian Rete Mediterranea (Mediterranean Network) and registered as RM 02. It was acquired by the Italian State Railways in 1918 and re-registered as 220.01.

== Overview ==
The locomotive was built by Carminati & Toselli in 1912 for shunting, freight trains and passenger trains on the third-rail electrified railway line Milan - Varese - Porto Ceresio, operated by Società per le Strade Ferrate del Mediterraneo. The electrical equipment was supplied by General Electric. The total power output was 220 kW (300 hp) (1 hour) or 150 kW (200 hp) (continuous) and the maximum speed was 50 km/h (31 mph). The two traction motors were geared directly to the axles. It appears to have been "deported" by German troops fleeing in 1945 and abandoned in Austria where it was converted to power supply from accumulators. In 1961 it was in Linz awaiting scrapping.
