= Pisa Aeroporto railway station =

Railway station in Italy

Pisa Aeroporto
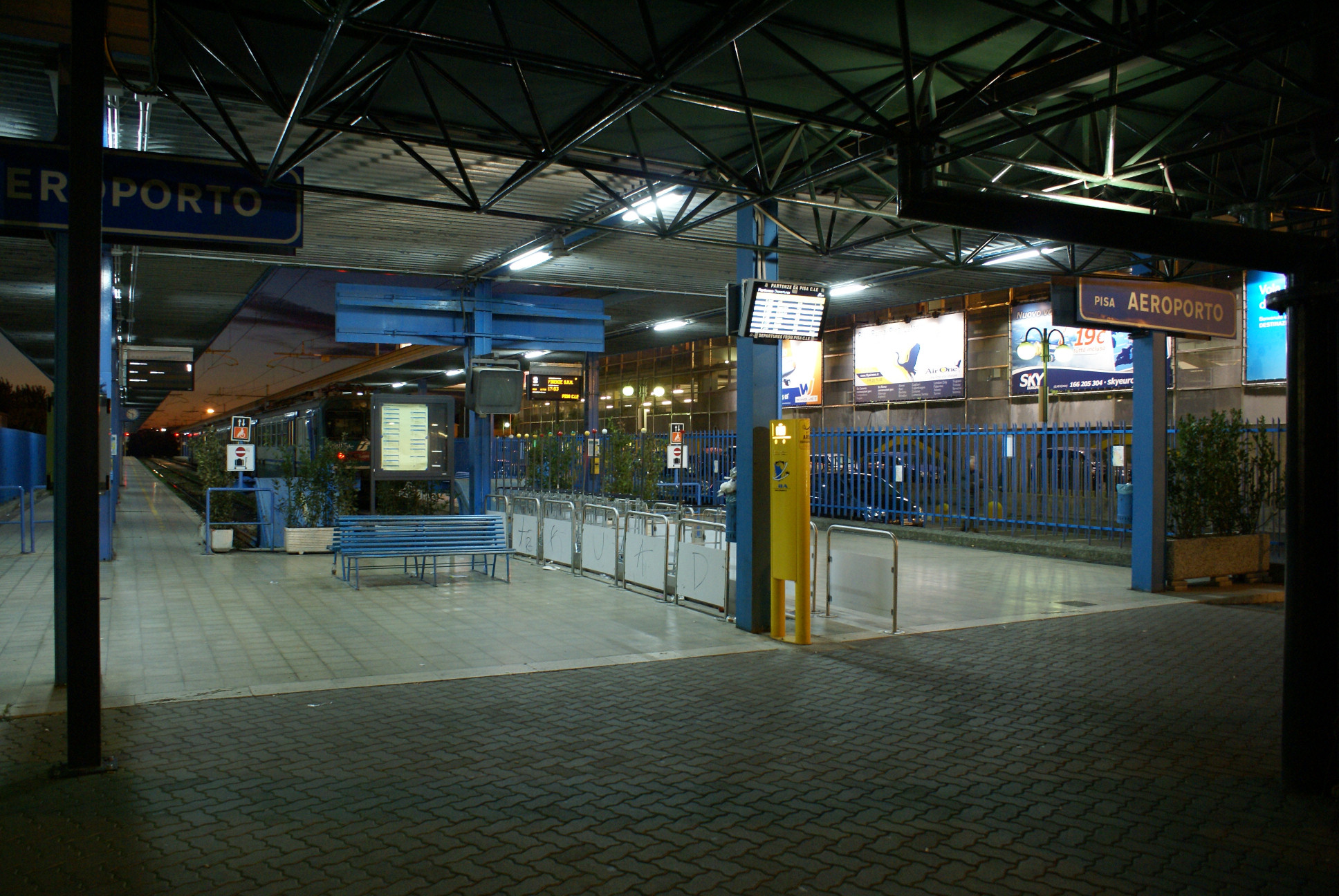
- Pisa Airport railway station

General information
- Location: Via Cannicci; 56125 Pisa PI; Pisa, Pisa, Tuscany; Italy
- Coordinates: 43°41′54″N 10°23′54″E
- Operator: Rete Ferroviaria Italiana
- Line: Pisa–Pisa Airport
- Distance: 1.445 km (0.898 mi) from Pisa Centrale
- Platforms: 2
- Train operators: Trenitalia
- Connections: Galileo Galilei Airport; Urban buses Direct buses to Florence, Lucca, Livorno

Other information
- Classification: Silver

History
- Opened: 1983
- Closed: 2013
Location
- Location within Tuscany Location within Italy

Pisa Aeroporto railway station (Italian: Stazione di Pisa Aeroporto) was a railway station within Pisa International Airport, Italy. A shuttle train service operated between it and the nearby main railway station in Pisa, Pisa Centrale railway station, although there were also a few direct services to Florence.

It was closed on 15 December 2013 to make way for the construction of a fully automated people mover, called PisaMover, which operates services to Pisa Centrale every five minutes. PisaMover came into operation in March 2017.

== Structure ==
Consisting of only two platforms, the airport station linked the airport with Pisa Centrale, the main railway station in Pisa, via a 1.445 km long (0.898 mi) railway line. The station was served mainly by regional rail services, most of them from Pisa Centrale. There were also some regional rail services to the airport from Firenze Santa Maria Novella railway station.

The facility was classified by its owner, Rete Ferroviaria Italiana, as category "Silver".

== See also ==
- History of rail transport in Italy
- List of railway stations in Tuscany
- Rail transport in Italy
- Railway stations in Italy
