= Pisa San Rossore railway station =

Railway station in Italy

Pisa San Rossore
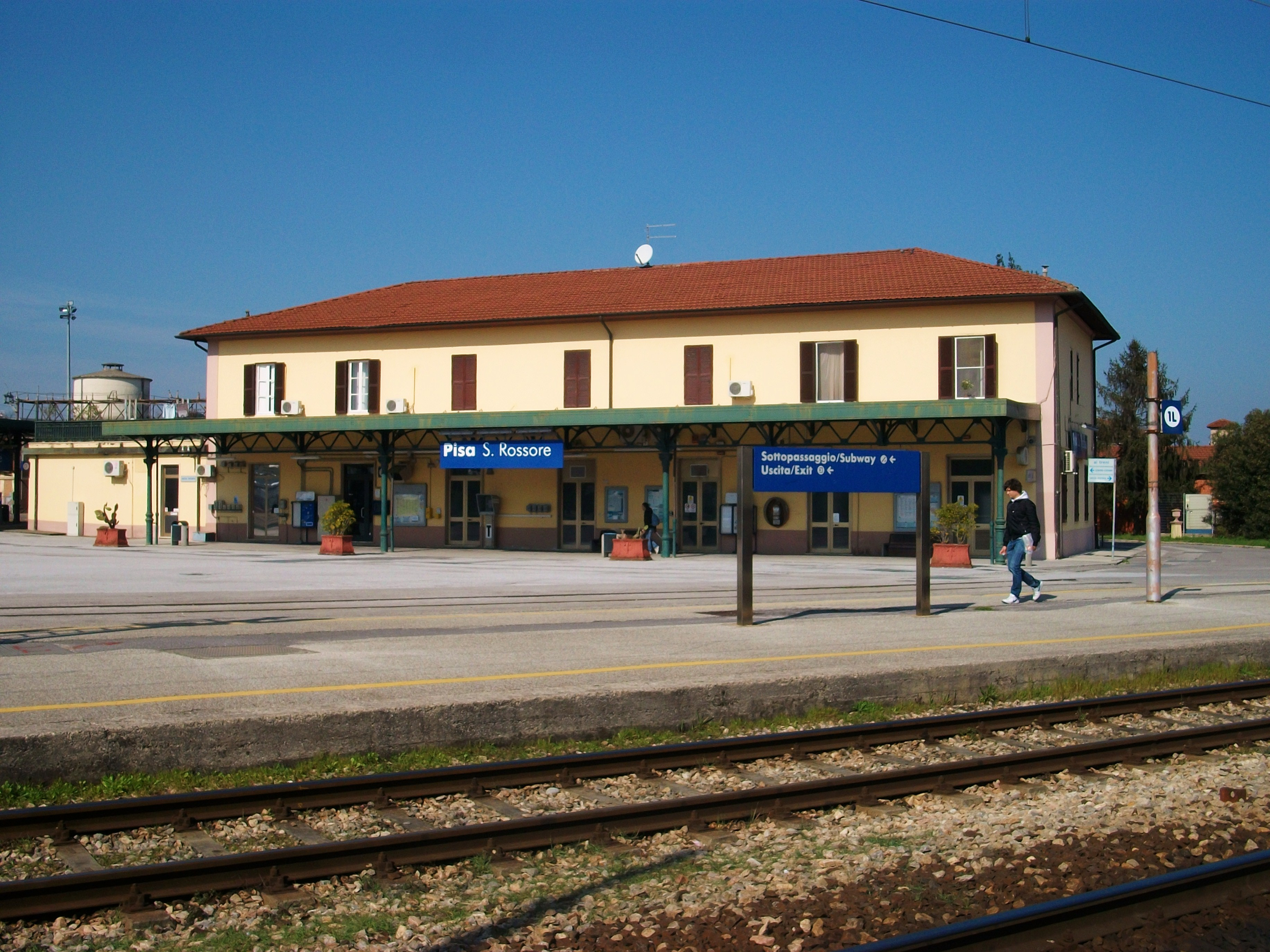
- Pisa San Rossore station building.

General information
- Coordinates: 43°43′26.24″N 10°23′16.44″E
- Owner: Rete Ferroviaria Italiana
- Operator: Trenitalia
- Lines: Pisa–La Spezia–Genoa; Lucca–Pisa
- Platforms: 6
Location
- Location within Tuscany Location within Italy

Pisa San Rossore railway station (Italian: Stazione di Pisa San Rossore) is a railway station in the Italian city of Pisa, the second station of the city in terms of passengers, after Pisa Centrale railway station. The station is located next to Piazza dei Miracoli and is served by local trains. It is a keilbahnhof, situated at the junction of two railway lines: Pisa–La Spezia–Genoa and Lucca–Pisa.

== Station ==
The main facility is currently closed for passengers, but there are many automatic ticket offices, snack machines, public toilets and a waiting room available. Inside the station there are six platforms (four to La Spezia and Genoa and two to Lucca), all equipped with lifts and connected by a subway.

== Interchange ==
Urban bus lines stops close to the station, and there is a bike-sharing station at one of the entrances.
