= Società per le Strade Ferrate del Mediterraneo =

The Società per le Strade Ferrate del Mediterraneo (Mediterranean Railway Company) was an Italian railway company from 1885 to 1905.

It was established on 1 July 1885 and it absorbed the lines of the Società per le strade ferrate dell'Alta Italia (Upper Italian Railways, SFAI) west of Milan, SFAI's line from Genoa to Pisa, most of the Società per le strade ferrate romane (Roman Railways) lines and most of the mainland network of the Società per le Strade Ferrate Calabro-Sicule (Calabrian-Sicilian Railroads).

The company operated the state network known as Rete Mediterranea (RM), which was absorbed into the state company Ferrovie dello Stato on 1 July 1905.
