= Pisa–Lucca railway =

Railway line in Italy

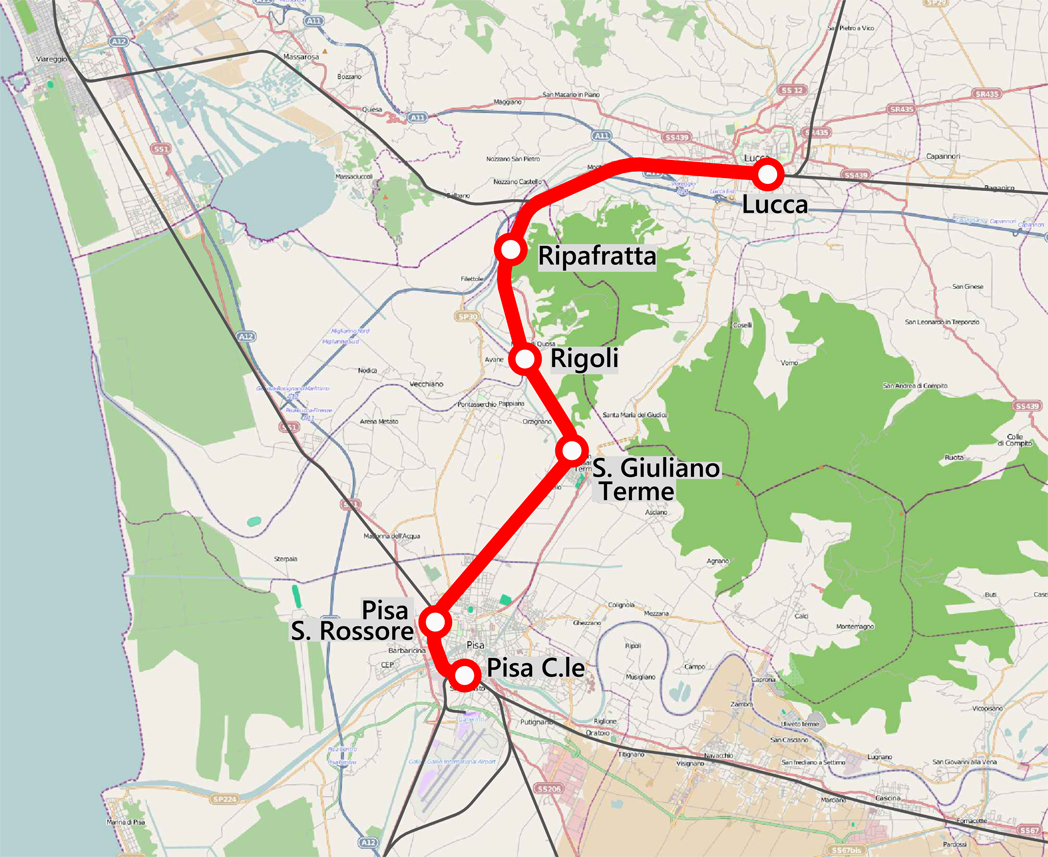

Overview
- Status: in use
- Owner: RFI
- Locale: Tuscany, Italy
- Termini: Pisa; Lucca

Service
- Type: Heavy rail
- Operator(s): Trenitalia

History
- Opened: 1846

Technical
- Line length: 24 km (15 mi)
- Track gauge: 1,435 mm (4 ft 8 1/2 in) standard gauge
- Electrification: 3 kV DC overhead line

The Pisa–Lucca railway (Italian: Ferrovia Pisa-Lucca) is a line that was built in 1846 connecting the Tuscan cities of Pisa and Lucca. It is fully electrified at 3,000 V DC. Passenger traffic is managed by Trenitalia.

== History ==
The development of a proposal in 1838 to construct a railway between Florence and Pisa (which led to the building of the Leopolda railway between 1844 and 1848) inspired interest in Lucca in a railway to stimulate economic development. The Duke of Lucca agreed in 1841 to the formation of a railway company to construct a railway between Lucca and Pisa. Over half the route was in Grand Duchy of Tuscany, so its agreement was also necessary.

It was decided to build the line from a station just outside Lucca’s walls to a temporary station outside Pisa’s Porta a Lucca (the Lucca gate in Pisa’s wall), in order to avoid building a bridge over the Arno river. The terminus was subsequently moved to Porta Nuova where it became known as Pisa San Rossore station. The first 8 km of the line were opened on 26 June 1846 between Lucca and Ripafratta. The line reached San Giuliano Terme on 29 September and Pisa on 15 November 1846, when regular train services commenced. At the time it was one of the first international railways in the world (although the Cologne–Aachen railway had been extended across the German-Belgian border in 1843), but it lost this status in the following year when the Duchy of Lucca was annexed by Tuscany.

From its earliest days it was not a profitable railway and was declared bankrupt in 1854 and an auction was arranged for 1858 to sell its assets. Meanwhile in pursued a merger with the Leopolda railway, which was finally achieved in 1859, creating the Strade Ferrate Livornesi (Livorno railway). This company was absorbed into the Società per le Strade Ferrate Romane (Roman Railways) in 1865. The Lucca–Pisa line was taken over by the Adriatic Network during the reorganisation of 1885, giving it a connection from Bologna and Florence to Livorno via Lucca and Pistoia. The competing Mediterranean Network, established at the same time, was assigned the route from Florence to Livorno via Empoli and Collesalvetti. Both networks became part of the national railways, Ferrovie dello Stato, in 1905. The line was electrified in 1960 at 3,000 V DC.

== See also ==
- List of railway lines in Italy
