= Società per le Strade Ferrate Romane =

Defunct Italian railway company

The Società per le strade ferrate romane (Roman Railways, SFR) was an Italian railway company from 1865 to 1885.

== History ==
=== 1860 ===
The Società Generale delle Strade Ferrate Romane (Italian: General Roman Railways) was formed in 1860 from a merger of the Società Pio Centrale (Central Pius Railway), builder of the Rome–Civitavecchia railway and the Società Pio Latina (Latin Pius Railway), builder of the Rome–Frascati railway. Shortly afterwards it absorbed the Royal Neapolitan Railway Company, builder of the Naples–Caserta railway.

=== 1865 ===
On 1 July 1865 the Roman Railways were established with 826 miles (1,329 km) of line, comprising 337 miles (542 km) from the General Roman Railway Company, 384 miles (618 km) of line from the Livornese Railway Company (Italian: Società delle Ferrovie Livornesi) and 105 miles (169 km) from the Central Railway Company of Tuscany (Italian: Società per la Ferrovia Centrale Toscana). At its establishment its network included the Rome–Cassino–Naples line, the Florence–Empoli–Pisa–Livorno line, the Florence–Pistoia–Pisa line, the Pisa–La Spezia–Massa line and the uncompleted Florence–Rome and Pisa–Livorno–Rome lines. It subsequently also built the Rome–Ancona line.

=== 1869 ===
It transferred the Florence–Pistoia–Pisa line and the Pisa–La Spezia–Massa line to the Società per le strade ferrate dell'Alta Italia (Upper Italian Railways) in 1869.

=== 1885 ===
On 1 July 1885 its network was taken over by the Rete Mediterranea (Mediterranean Network) and the Rete Adriatica (Adriatic Network), with the coastal line from La Spezia to Pisa, Rome and Naples and the line from Pisa to Florence via Empoli going to the Rete Mediterranea and the lines from Rome to Florence and Ancona going to the Rete Adriatica.
