= History of rail transport in Italy =

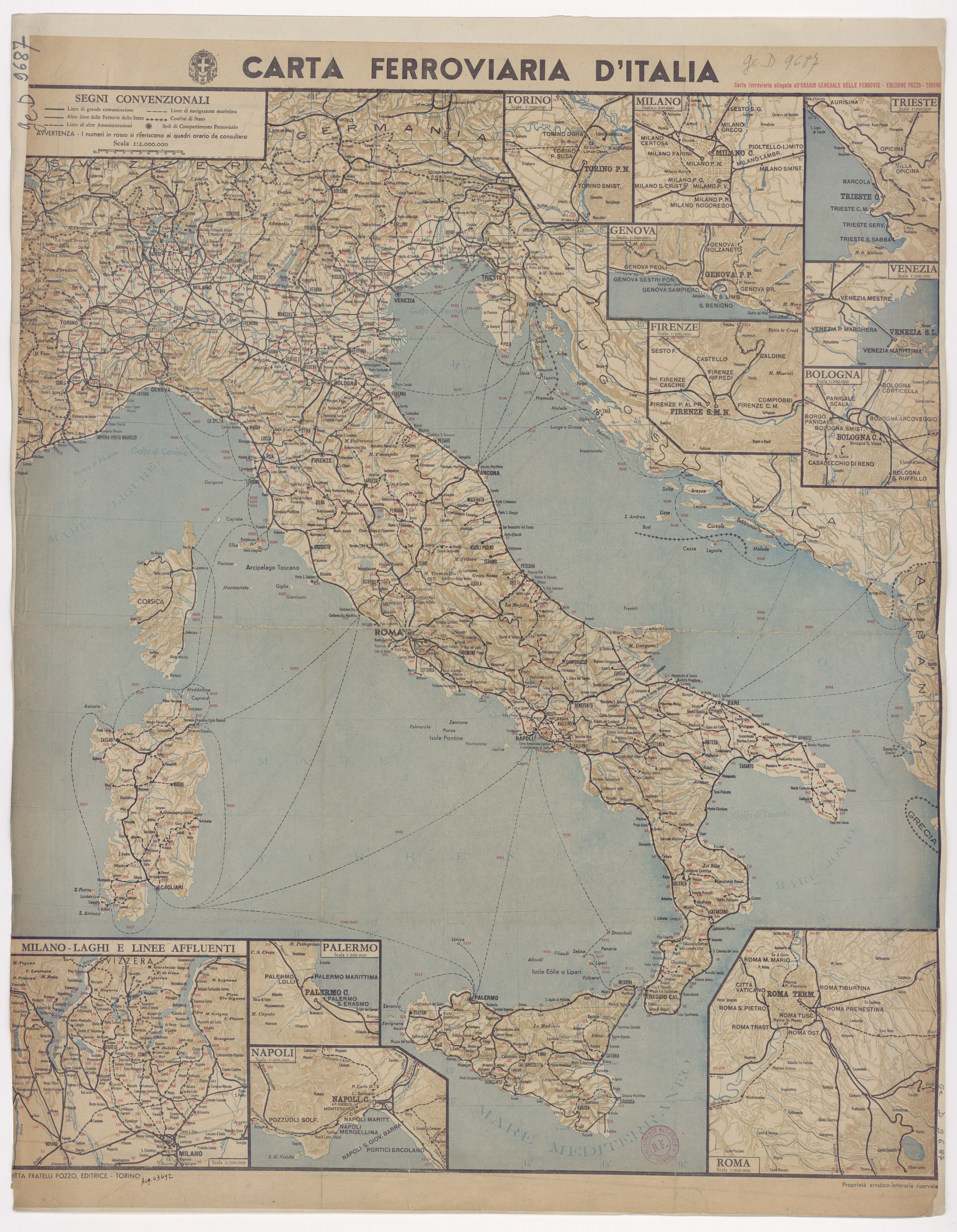
Historical map of the Italian railways system in the 1940s

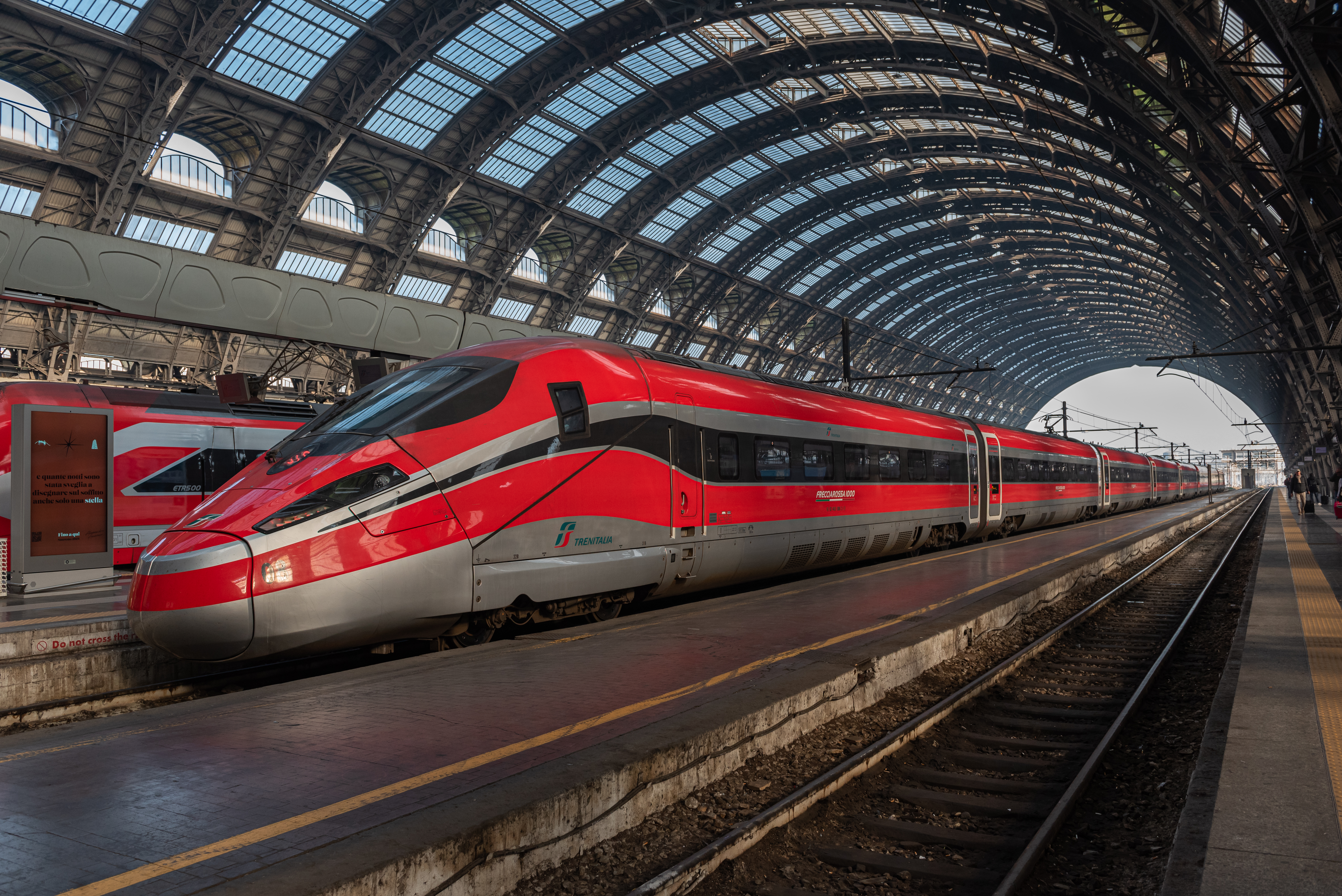
FS' Frecciarossa 1000 high speed train at Milano Centrale railway station, with a maximum speed of 400 km/h (249 mph), is one of the fastest trains in Europe.

The Italian railway system is one of the most important parts of the infrastructure of Italy, with a total length of 24,227 km (15,054 mi) as of 2011.

== Origins ==
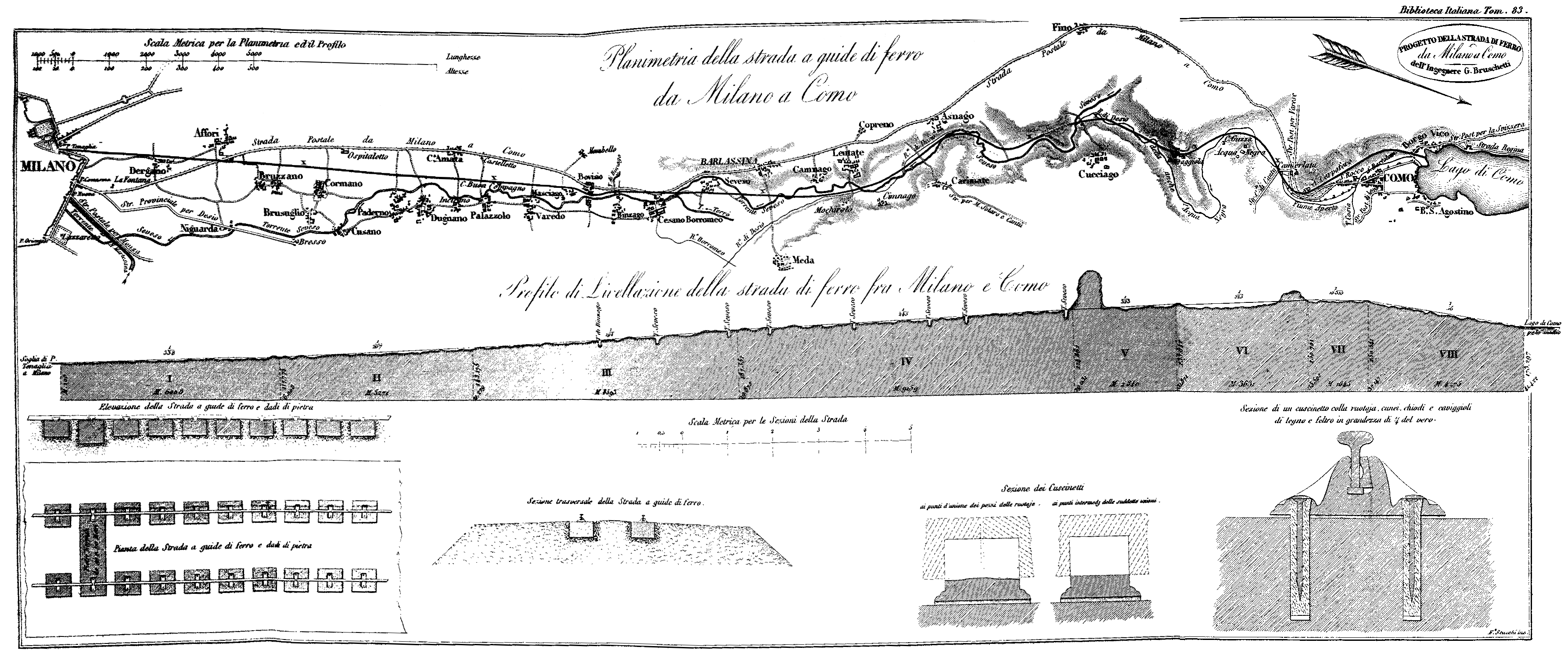
Engraving showing the plan of the Milan-Como line (1836)

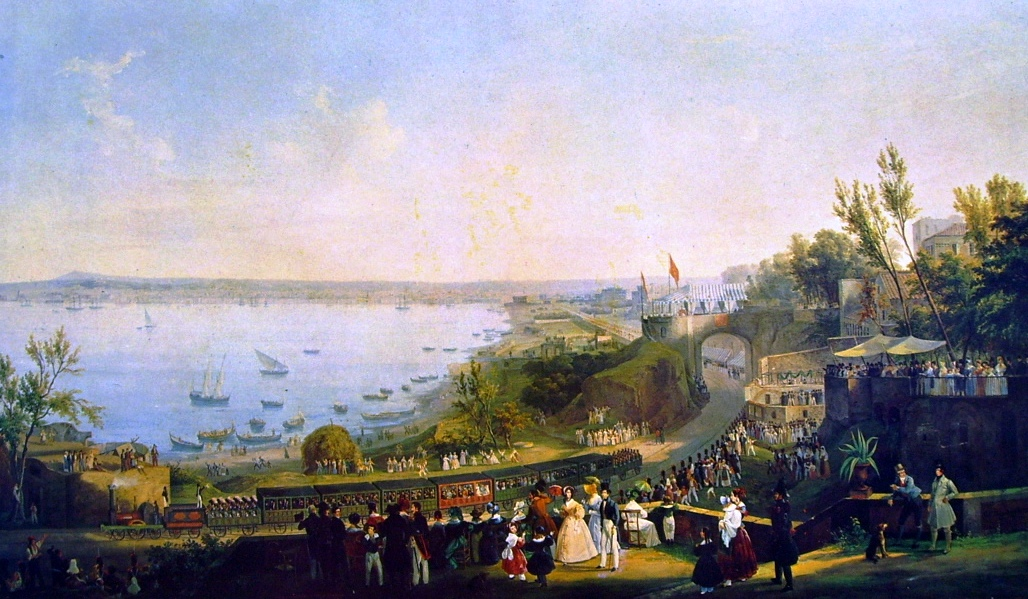
The inauguration of the Naples–Portici railway on 3 October 1839, the first Italian railway line

The first Railways were introduced in Italy when it was still a divided country, a few decades before the political unification.

The first line to be built on the peninsula was the Naples–Portici line, in the Kingdom of the Two Sicilies, which was 7.64 km (4.75 mi) long and was inaugurated on 3 October 1839, nine years after the world's first "modern" inter-city railway, the Liverpool and Manchester Railway. The following year the firm Holzhammer of Bolzano was granted the "Imperial-Royal privilege" to build the Milano–Monza line (12 km (7.5 mi)), the second railway built in Italy, in the then Kingdom of Lombardy–Venetia, a part of the Austrian Empire.

On request of the Milanese and Venetian industries, but also for the already clear military importance, construction of the Milan–Venice line was begun. In 1842 the Padua-Mestre stretch of 32 km (20 mi) was inaugurated, followed in 1846 by the Milan-Treviglio (32 km (20 mi)) and Padua-Vicenza (30 km (19 mi)), as well as the bridge spanning the lagoon of Venice.

In the Kingdom of Sardinia (comprising Piedmont, Liguria and Sardinia), King Charles Albert ordered on 18 July 1844 the construction of the Turin–Genoa railway, which was inaugurated on 18 December 1853. This was followed by the opening of other sections which connected with France, Switzerland and Kingdom of Lombardy–Venetia.

A locomotive factory was also founded in Genoa, in order to avoid the English monopoly in the field. This became the modern Ansaldo.

In Tuscany, the Duke of Lucca signed the concession for the Lucca–Pisa railway, while, in 1845, the Duchy of Parma began the construction of two lines towards Piacenza and Modena. In the Papal States, Pope Gregory XVI opposed railways but Pope Pius IX took a more liberal view. Some lines were begun in 1846 under Pius IX with the Rome and Frascati Rail Road then the Rome and Civitavecchia Rail Road.

In the course of the Wars of Italian Independence railways proved to be instrumental in the defeat of Charles Albert's army at Peschiera, as well as in the Austrian defeats at Palestro and at Magenta: in the latter French troops were able to reach the battlefield quickly thanks to the new means of transport and established a defence line right on the ballast of the line.

== Under unified Italy ==
Rail network in Italy 1861-1870

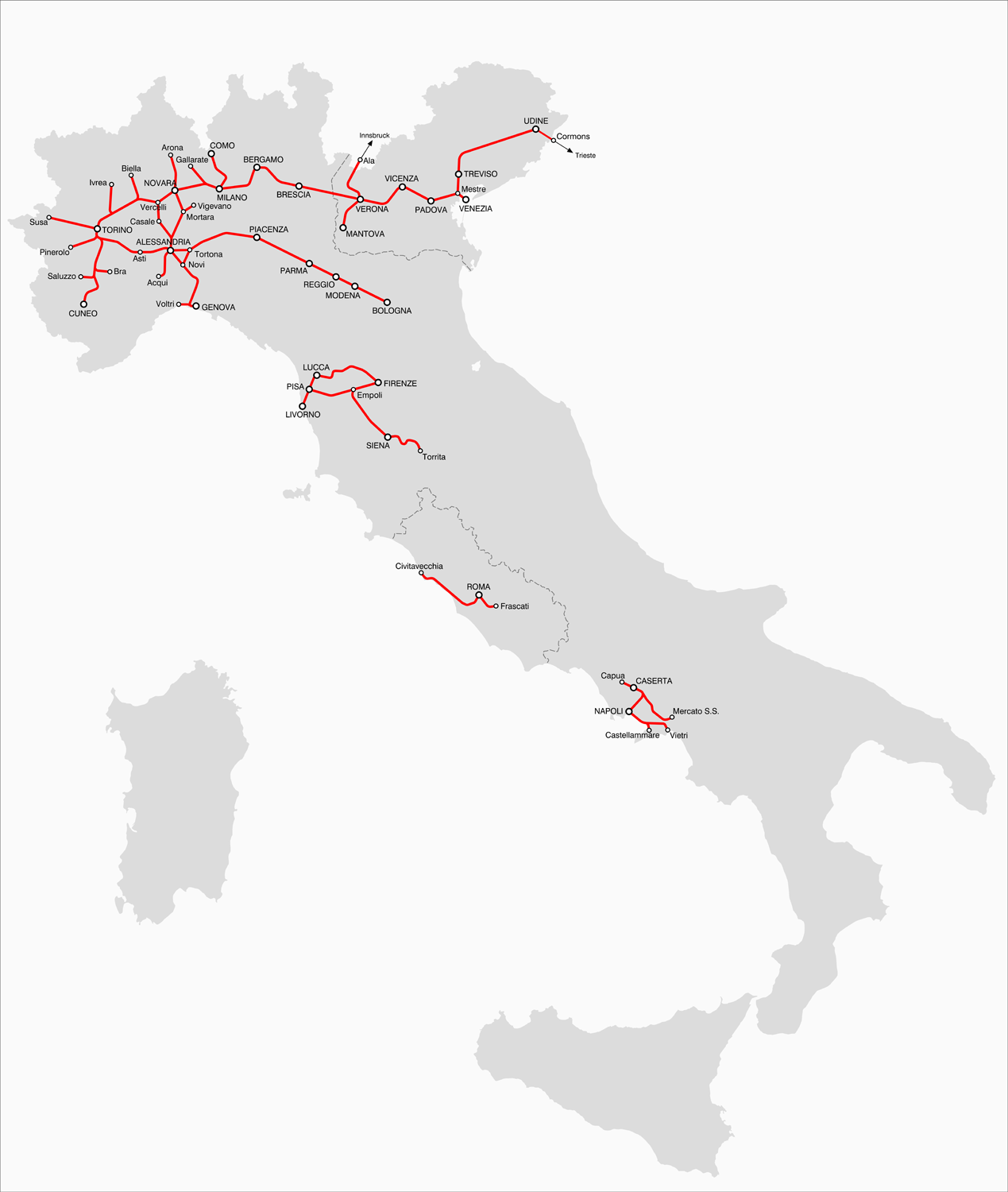
Network as of 17 March 1861

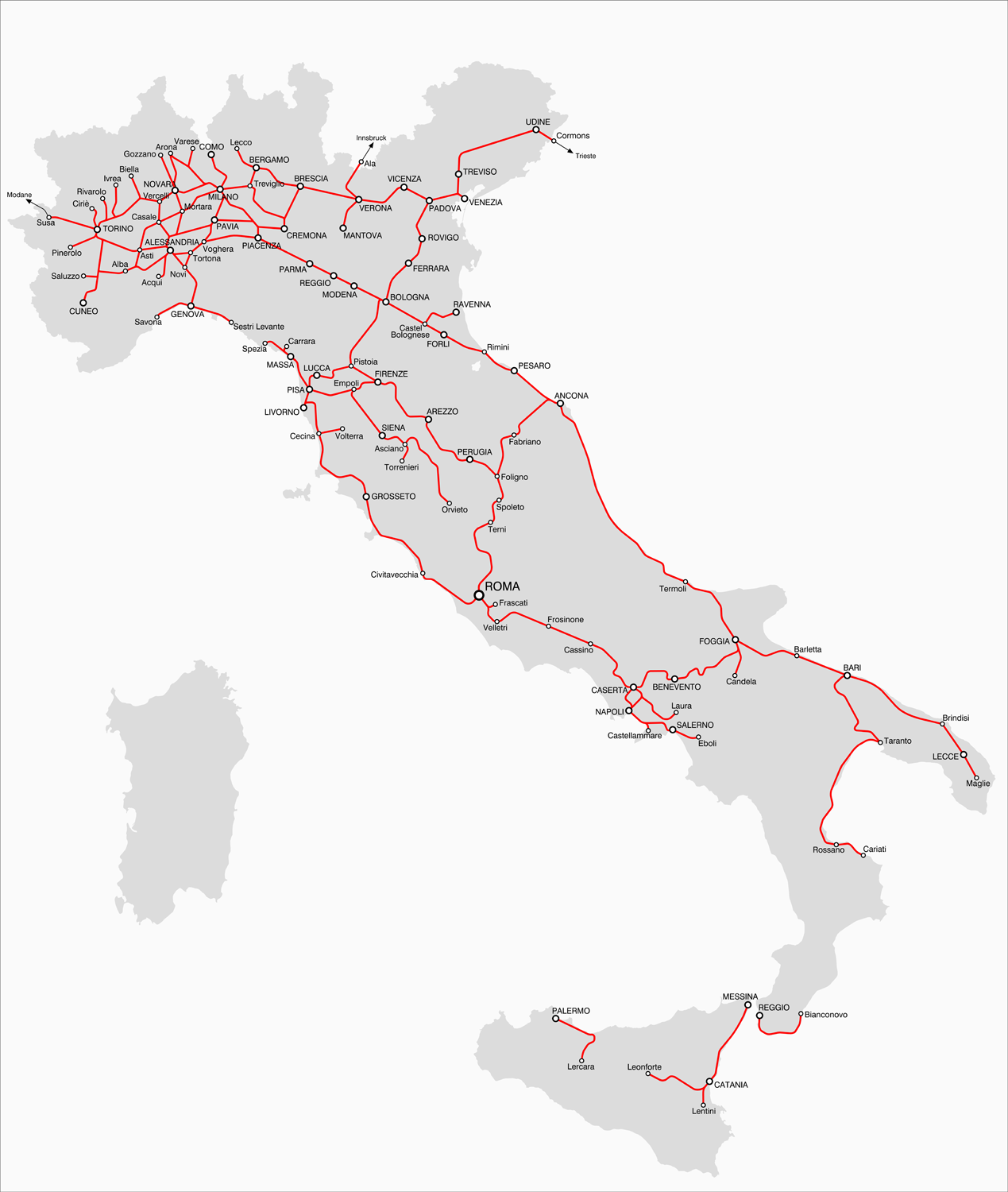
Network as of 20 September 1870

At the creation of the unified Kingdom of Italy (1861), railways in the country were the following:

Piedmont	850 km (530 mi)
Lombardy–Venetia	522 km (324 mi)
Tuscany	257 km (160 mi)
Papal State	317 km (197 mi) (year 1870)
Kingdom of the Two Sicilies	128 km (80 mi)

for a total of 2,064 km (1,283 mi) active railways. Lines in the Papal States were still under construction, whilst Sicily had its first, short railway only in 1863 (Palermo-Bagheria). The existing lines did not form an organized network: property of the line was state or private, the latter in turn for private or state use. An organic structure began to be created in 1865 with the connection of the existing sections. In order to promote industrial development, the government entrusted the existing lines to five concessionaires:

- SFAI (Società per le strade ferrate dell'Alta Italia)
- SFR (Società per le strade ferrate romane)
- SFM (Società per le Strade Ferrate Meridionali)
- Società Vittorio Emanuele
- Società Reale delle ferrovie sarde

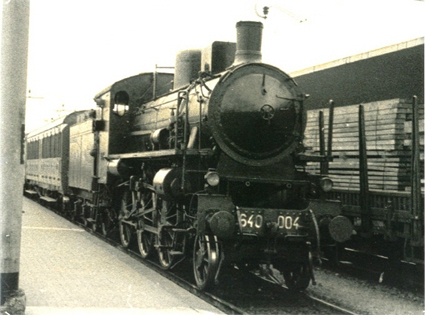
A FS 640 steam locomotive

The war of 1866 caused great disruption to industrial activities, including those of the railway companies, which almost went bankrupt, and state intervention was needed to save them. In 1870 the last remnant of the Papal States was also annexed to Italy: it comprised the railway connection from Rome to Frascati, Civitavecchia, Terni and Cassino (through Velletri). In 1872 there were in Italy about 7,000 km (4,300 mi) of railways, entrusted to the existing companies as follows:

company	km/mi
SFAI	3,006 km (1,868 mi)
SFR	1,586 km (985 mi)
SFM	1,327 km (825 mi)
Società per le Strade Ferrate Calabro-Sicule	551 km (342 mi)

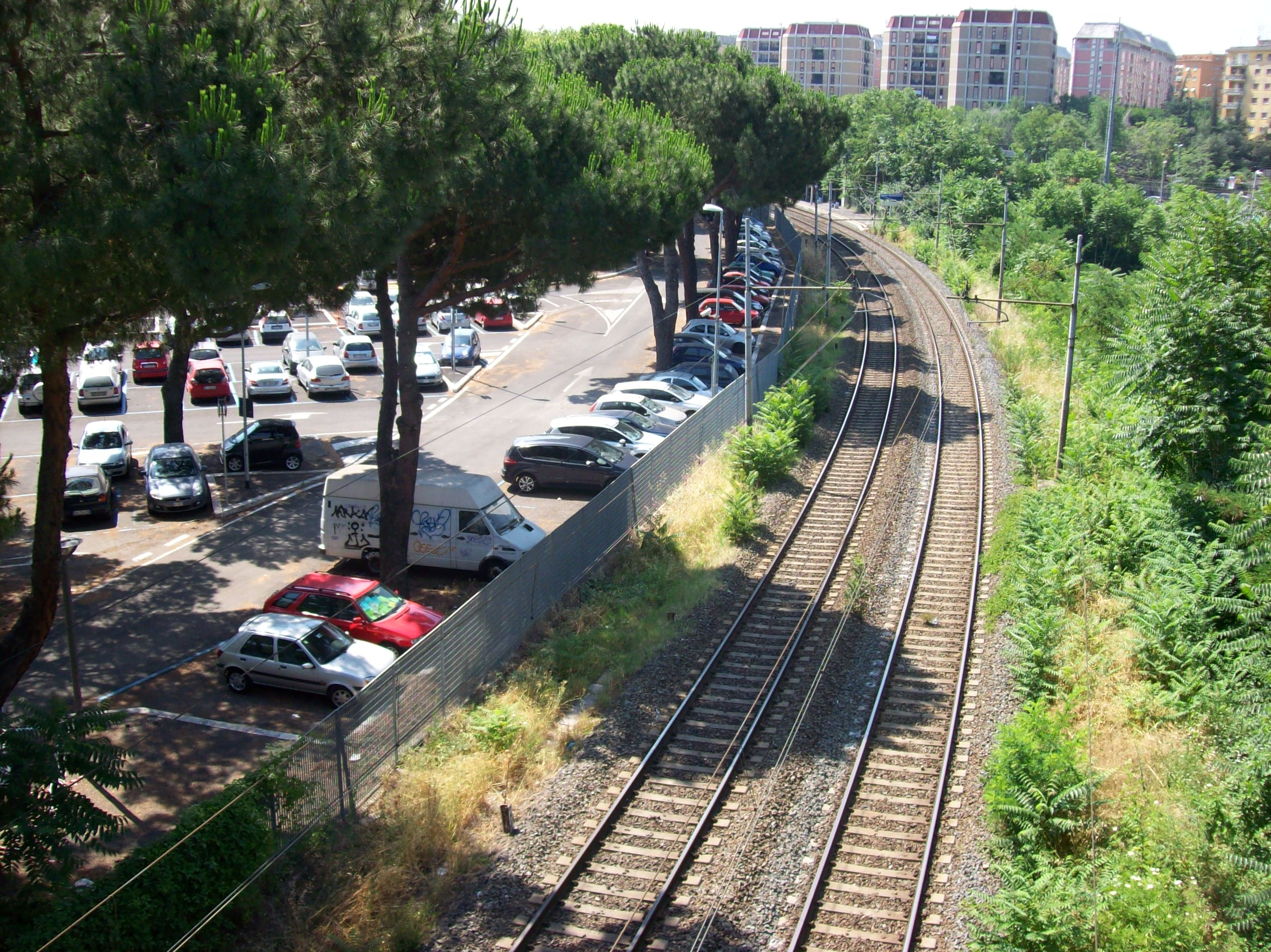
Florence–Rome railway

Other secondary lines were operated by minor companies. After unification, construction of new lines was boosted: in 1875, with the completion of the section Orte-Orvieto, the direct Florence–Rome line was completed, reducing the travel time of the former route passing through Foligno-Terontola. The economic situation of the secondary companies continued to get worse, aggravating the failure of the concessionaire regime at a time when in the whole of Europe the tendency to aggregate all railways into a single, state-owned company became predominant. This, among other benefits, fulfilled the transport demands that a strictly profit-oriented policy could not afford.

The Italian government was however slow to react, and only in 1878 and 1880, respectively, the largely deficitaire SFAI and SFR went under state administration.

== The convenzioni of 1884 ==
First class passenger car of the Rete Adriatica

Despite this situation, in 1884 the Italian Parliament issued a commission study in which it was declared preferable a private administration of railways. The Convenzioni (concessions) between Italy and the three main remaining private companies were signed on 23 April 1884 for a period of 60 years. SFM was assigned the lines on the Adriatic Sea (Rete Adriatica, Italian for Adriatic Network), while the Società per le Strade Ferrate del Mediterraneo and the Società delle Ferrovia della Sicilia received, respectively, the Rete Mediterranea (Mediterranean Network, lines facing the Ligurian, Ionian and Tyrrhenian Seas) and the Rete Sicula (Sicilian Network). The companies received in total 8,510 km (5,290 mi) of railways, under the vigilance of the Ministry of the Public Works, through a General Inspectorate for Railways, which replaced the previous position of the General Royal Commissariate.

However, this move not only failed to improve the situation of railways, hampering the economic development and tourism as well, but worsened it further. Liabilities of the secondary lines greatly exceeded the profits from the few remaining ones, and absorbed all the state subsidies. By the 1880s the Italian railways amounted to 10,510 km (6,530 mi).

== Ferrovie dello Stato ==
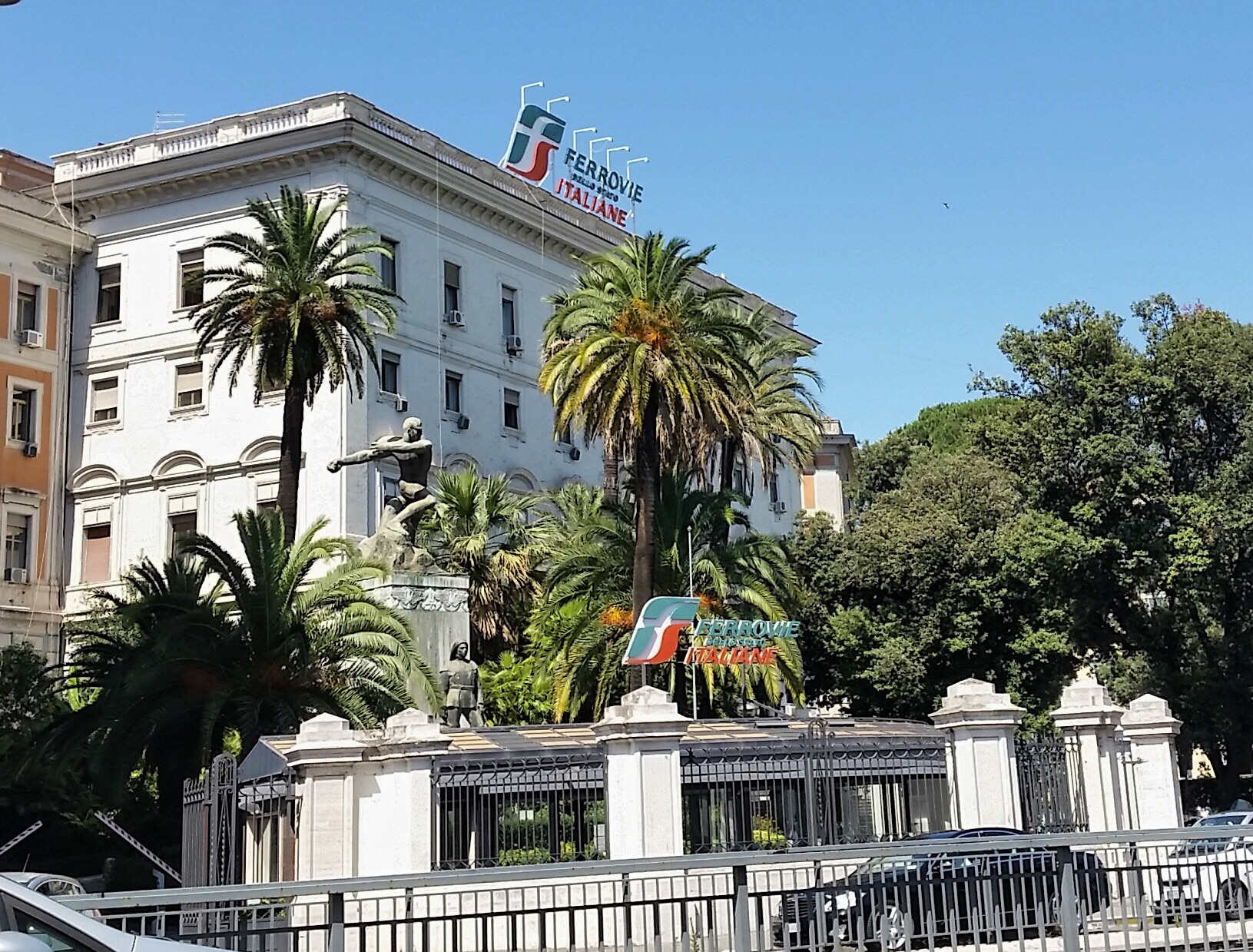
Head office of the Ferrovie dello Stato in Rome

Private companies were definitively bought back by the Italian state on 1 July 1905, with the creation of the Ferrovie dello Stato (State Railways), or FFSS, with a total of 10,557 km (6,560 mi) of lines, of which it already owned 9,686 km (6,019 mi). The move was completed the following year with the acquisition of the remaining SFM network: by then FFSS possessed 13,075 km (8,124 mi) of lines, of which 1,917 km (1,191 mi) with double tracks.

A General Director was appointed, the Piedmontese engineer Riccardo Bianchi, who had held the same position for the Ferrovie Sicule. A General Direction was created, with 13 Central Services and two General Inspectorates, based in Rome. For peripheral operations, eight Compartmental Directions were created.

A capable and respected organizer, he had received a grievous heritage from the previous organizational chaos. The worst problem was the rolling stock: FFSS had 2,664 steam locomotives, 738 with more than 30 years of service; passenger cars were 6,985, mostly older than 30 years; freight cars were 52,778, with one fifth older than 40 years. The first urgent measure was construction in 1905–06 of 567 new locomotives, 1,244 passenger cars (including the first provided with bogies) and 20,263 freight cars.

Under Bianchi, the FFSS rapidly modernised; the semaphore system was introduced; and centralized hydrodynamic switches and signals were added in the main stations, which were updated or built from scratch. Electrification, already used on the lines around Varese and in Valtellina, was expanded, particularly in the north of Italy, using the three-phase AC system.

Bianchi's direction lasted for ten years. Under his successor, ing. De Cornè, the FFSS was involved in the Italian effort in World War I (from 24 May 1915). The company suffered much destruction, and after the end of the conflict, had new problems from the incorporation of lines in the new territories lost by Austria, with different equipment and rules.

== Fascist era ==
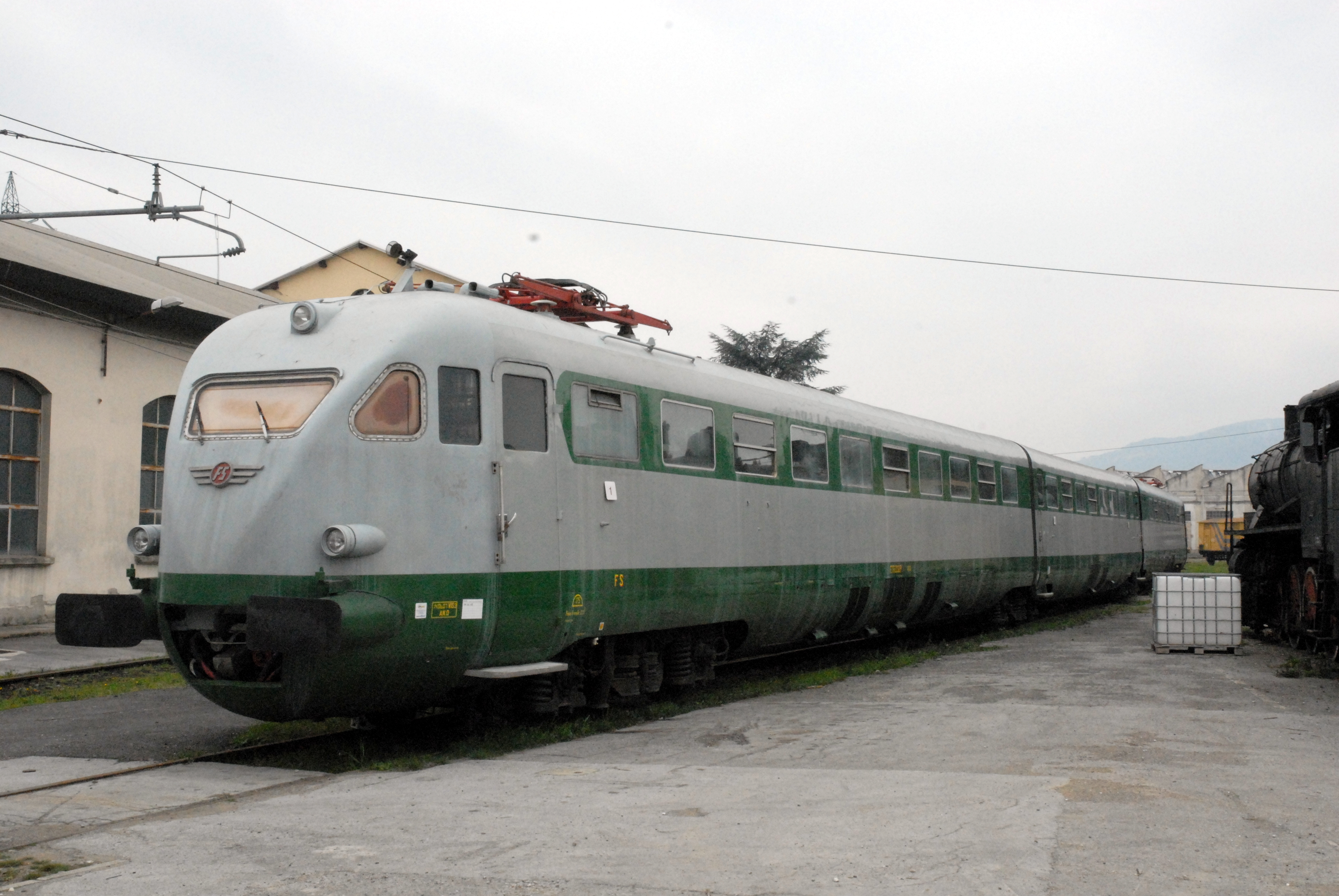
The original Italian ETR 200 trainset of the speed world record (203 km/h or 126 mph) in 1938, now preserved as historical train, was re-numbered ETR 232 in the 1960s

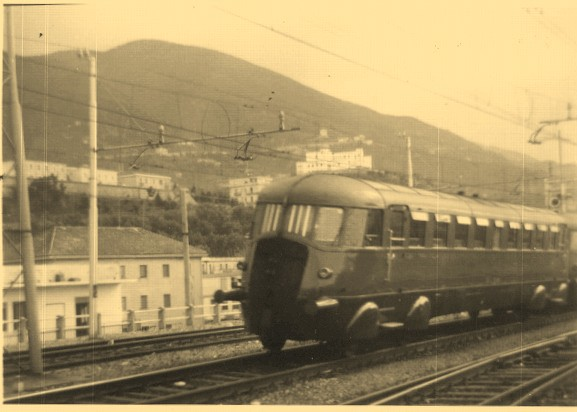
An ALn 56 Littorina

The period from 1922 to 1939 was heavy with important construction and modernisation programmes for the Italian railways, which also incorporated 400 km (250 mi) from the Ferrovie Reali Sarde of Sardinia. The most important programme was that of the Rome–Naples and Bologna–Florence direttissimas ("most direct lines"): the first reduced the travel time from the two cities by an hour and a half; the second, announced proudly as "constructing Fascism", included the second longest tunnel in the world at the time. Electrification on 3,000 V direct current was introduced, which later supplanted the existing three-phase system. Other improvements included automatic blocks, light signals, construction of numerous main stations (Milan Central, Napoli Mergellina, Roma Ostiense and others) and other technical modernisations.

The rolling stock was enhanced from 1933 by DMU and EMU, nicknamed Littorine from the lictorial symbols of the Fascist regime. The Italian EMUs (elettrotreni), in particular, started the traditional vanguard position of Italy in the field: on 6 December 1937 an ETR 200 travelled on the Rome-Naples line at a speed of 201 km/h (125 mph) in the Campoleone-Cisterna section. Two years later the same train reached 203 km/h (126 mph) on the Milan–Florence line.

The Italian high-speed service began in 1938 with an electric-multiple-unit ETR 200, designed for 200 km/h (120 mph), between Bologna and Naples. It too reached 160 km/h (99 mph) in commercial service, and achieved a world mean speed record of 203 km/h (126 mph) between Florence and Milan in 1938.

In this period food trains made up of refrigerated wagons started to run from southern to northern Italy, and abroad. The Ferrovie dello Stato were moved from the Ministry of Public Works to the newly formed Ministry of Transports.

== From World War II to the 1970s ==
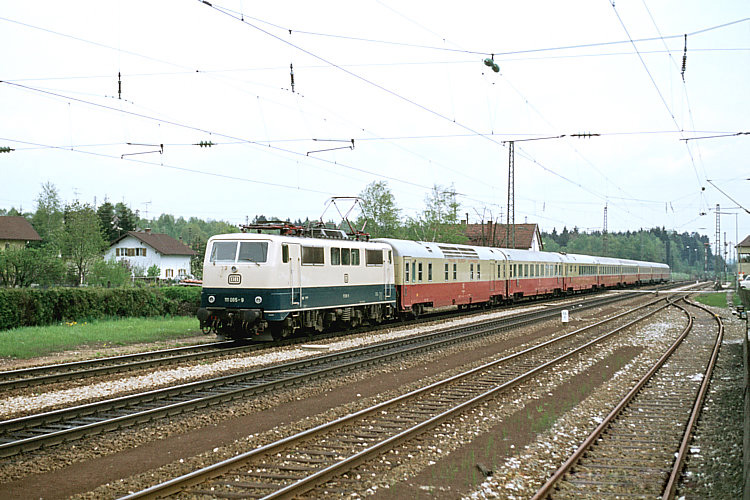
TEE 84 Mediolanum (Milano - München) in 1977

The war left railways in Italy in a disrupted state. Entire lines were out of action and much of the rolling stock destroyed. Thanks to the Marshall Plan, in the following years they could be rebuilt. However, a lack of attention to the problem of reconstruction and the short-sightedness of politicians did not allow, as there could have been, a remedy for the inconsistencies of the conformation of the network that were the legacy of the past, correcting no longer functional layouts, and building entirely new ones; it was preferred to quickly reactivate everything possible. The fundamental line Battipaglia-Reggio Calabria was doubled, while a program of updating of infrastructures, superstructures, services, colour-light signalling and cars was updated or extended. The three-phase lines were gradually turned into standard 3,000 V dc lines.

Increasing numbers of steam locomotives were replaced by electric or diesel ones; in the 1960s also the first unified passenger cars appeared and the first attempts of interoperability with foreign companies were started, culminating in the creation of Trans Europe Express services.

More modern ferries for the service over the Strait of Messina were introduced and, in 1961, a similar service was begun to Sardinia, although not providing transport of railway cars.

== High speed projects ==
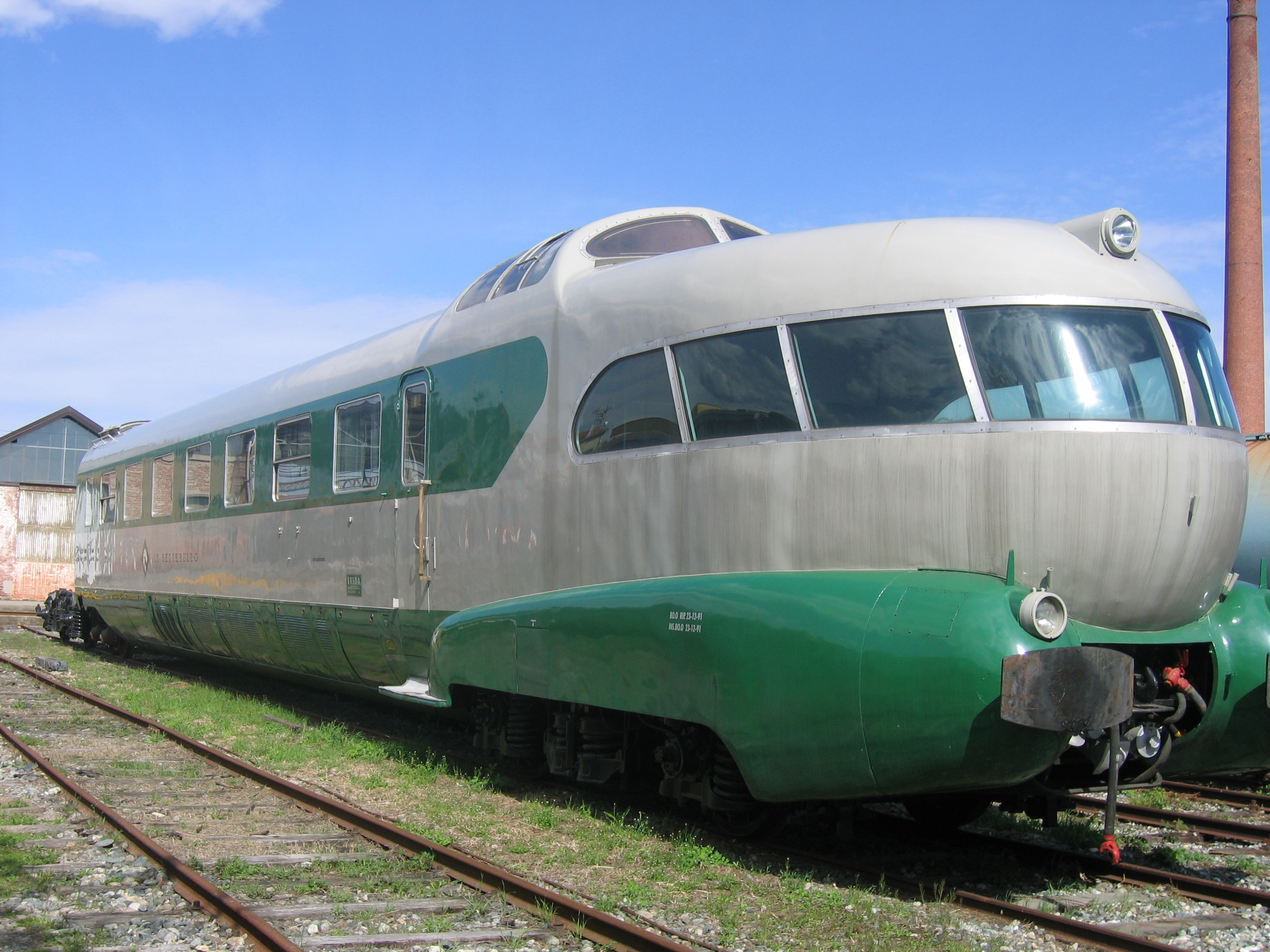
An ETR 300 Italian fast EMU of the 1950s, used for Settebello service

In the 1960s, the FS started an innovative project for high speed trains. E.444 locomotives were the first standard locomotives able to reach 200 km/h (125 mph), while an ALe 601 EMU reached a speed of 240 km/h (150 mph) during a test. Other EMUs, such as the ETR 220, ETR 250 and ETR 300 were also updated for speeds up to 200 km/h (125 mph). The braking systems of cars were updated to fit the increased travelling speeds.

On 25 June 1970, construction of the Florence–Rome Direttissima was started. The line was the first high-speed line opened in Europe when more than half of it opened on 24 February 1977. This included the 5.375 km (3.340 mi) bridge over the Paglia river, then the longest in Europe. However, the project was completed only in the early 1990s.

In 1975, a crack program for a widespread updating of the rolling stock was launched. However, as it was decided to put more emphasis on local traffic, this caused a shifting of resources from the ongoing high speed projects, with their subsequent slowing or, in some cases, total abandonment. Therefore, 160 E.656 electric and 35 D.345 locomotives for short-medium range traffic were acquired, together with 80 EMUs of the ALe 801/940 class, 120 ALn 668 diesel railcars. Some 1,000 much-needed passenger and 7,000 new freight cars were also ordered.

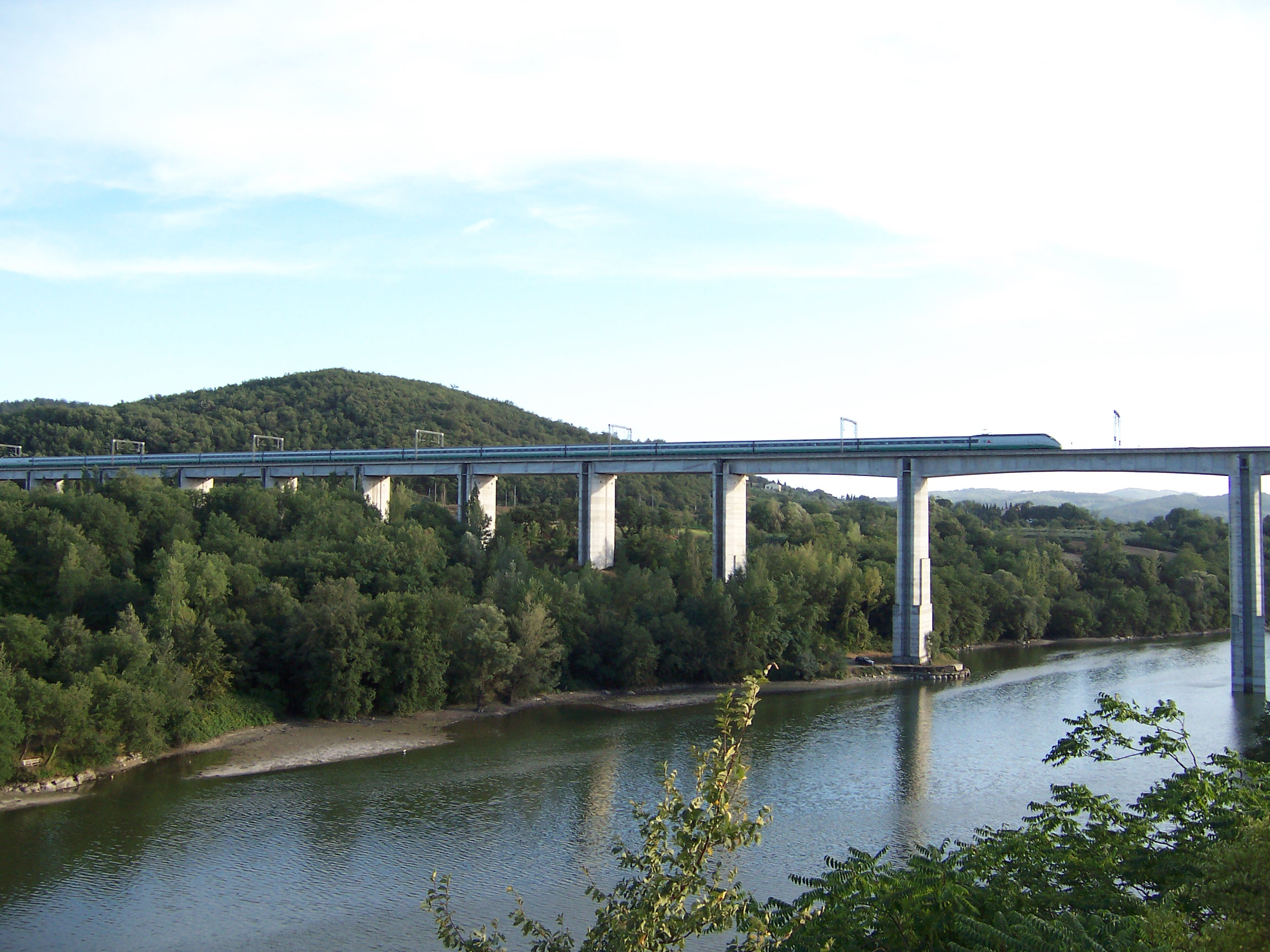
An ETR 500 train running on the Florence–Rome high-speed line near Arezzo, the first high-speed railway opened in Europe.

The actual High-speed rail in Italy consists of two lines connecting most of the country's major cities. The first line connects Turin to Salerno via Milan, Bologna, Florence, Rome and Naples, the second runs from Turin to Venice via Milan and Verona, and is under construction in parts. Trains are operated with a top speed of 300 km/h (190 mph).

== From 1980s onwards ==
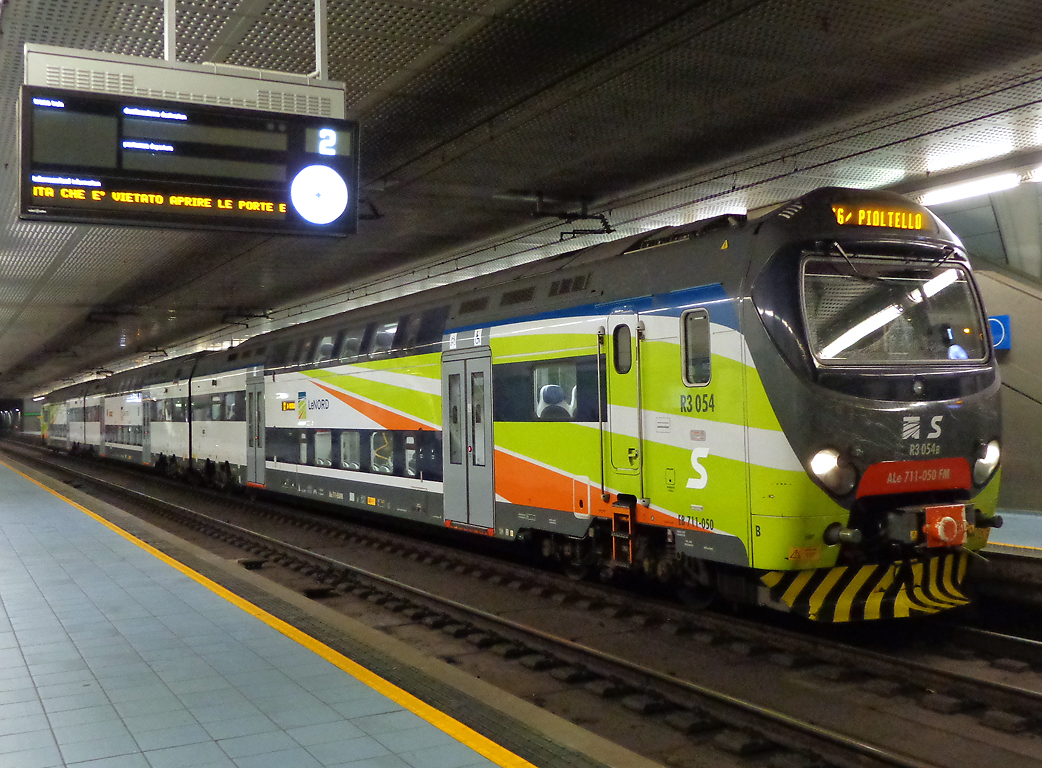
A TSR train at Milano Porta Venezia railway station for local service

The 1980s were a controversial period. Despite the recent efforts, the average age of the rolling stock increased, especially on secondary lines, late running was frequent and the freight sector lost ground in favour of road transportation. The situation started to improve only from the early 1990s, when the first effects of the new high-speed programs launched from the late 1970s began to appear: these included the famous ETR 400 Pendolino, capable of 250 km/h (160 mph) and first used for the Rome-Florence-Bologna-Milan service. These were later replaced by the more advanced ETR 450 and ETR 500, the latter capable of speed up to 300 km/h (190 mph). Works on the high-speed lines continued, the Rome-Naples being opened in 2005. Other lines are under construction.

In 2000 FS became a holding company which controls various companies, among which is Trenitalia, a limited society. The various services were divided into three different companies for long range (FS Divisione Passeggeri), local range (FS Regionale) and freight (FS Cargo), while numerous other sub-companies were also created. Property of the railway was assigned to RFI (Rete Ferroviaria Italiana) from 2001 (an FS company as well).

Today railways in Italy continue to experience the difficulties and incongruities inherited from past times. Modern high-speed lines, trains and locomotives (E402) are paired by others, especially in southern Italy, in which the transportation speed is very slow. The freight sector has only recently showed signs of recovery from the long-term depressed state it has lived in through the 20th century. Commuter services are often causes of polemics due to poor services; in several cases necessary lines survive only through support of local authorities.

== Railways companies certified for operation in Italy ==
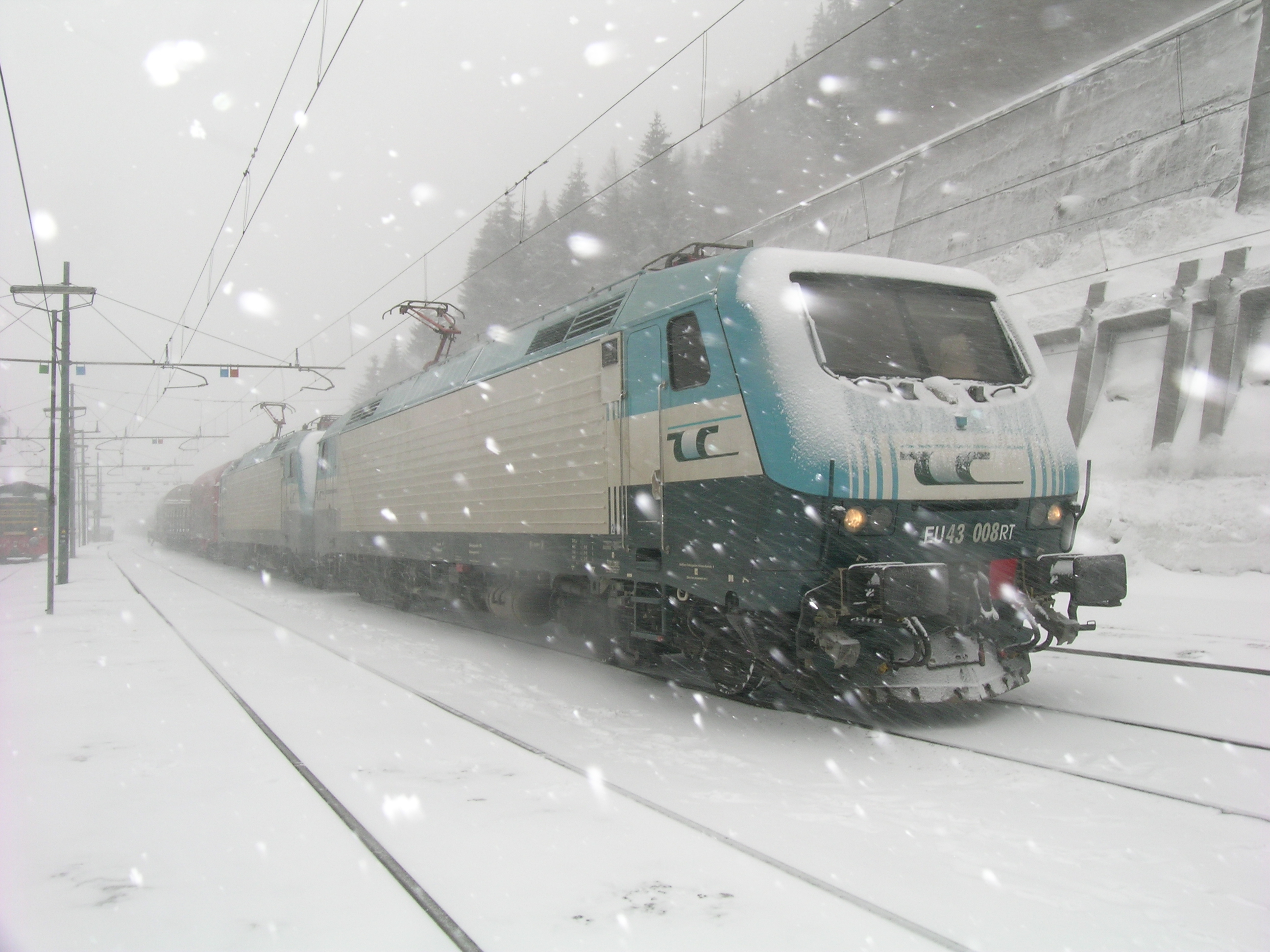
An EU43 of Rail Traction Company (RTC) on the Brenner Pass line

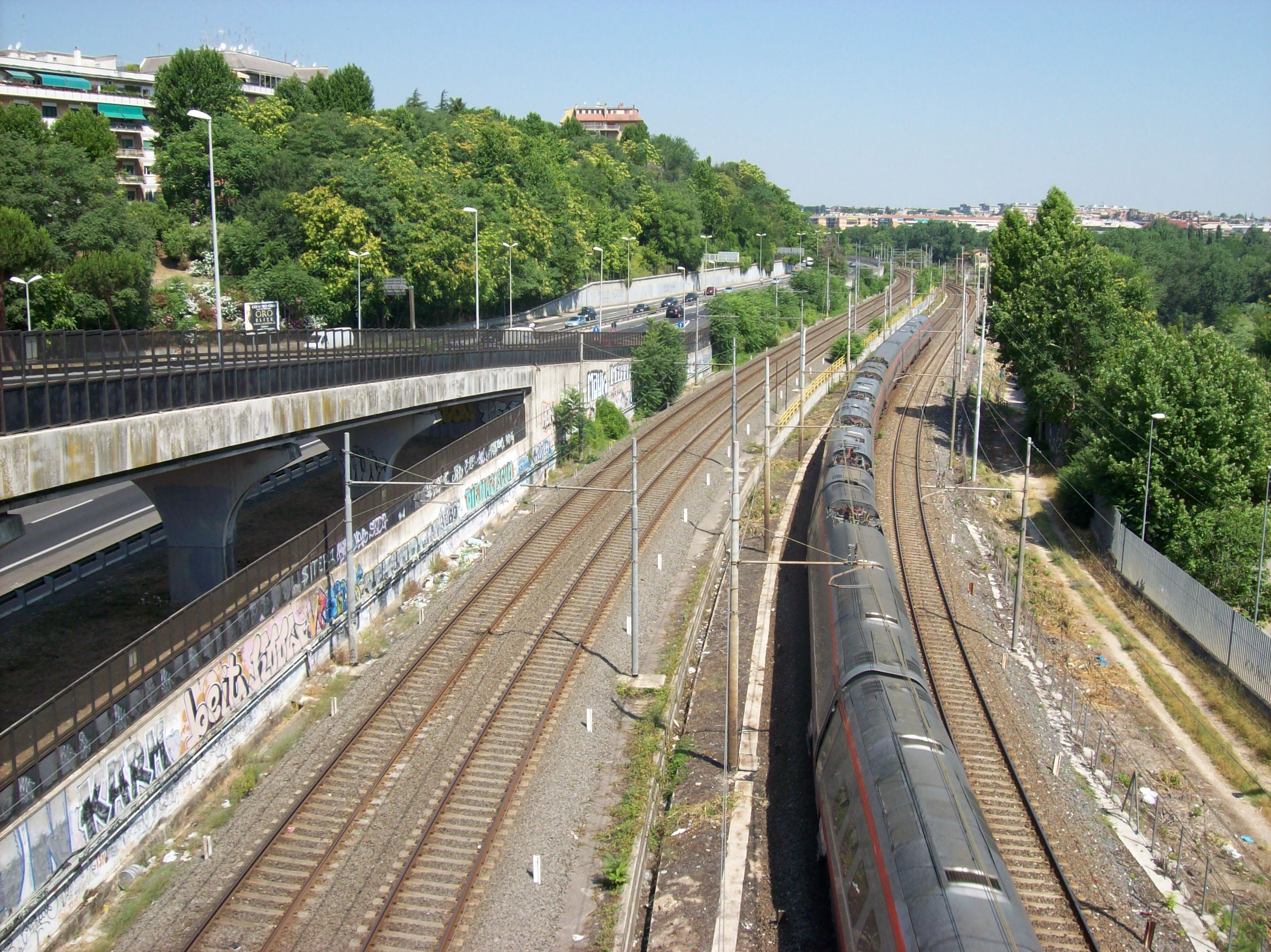
The Florence–Rome high-speed railway

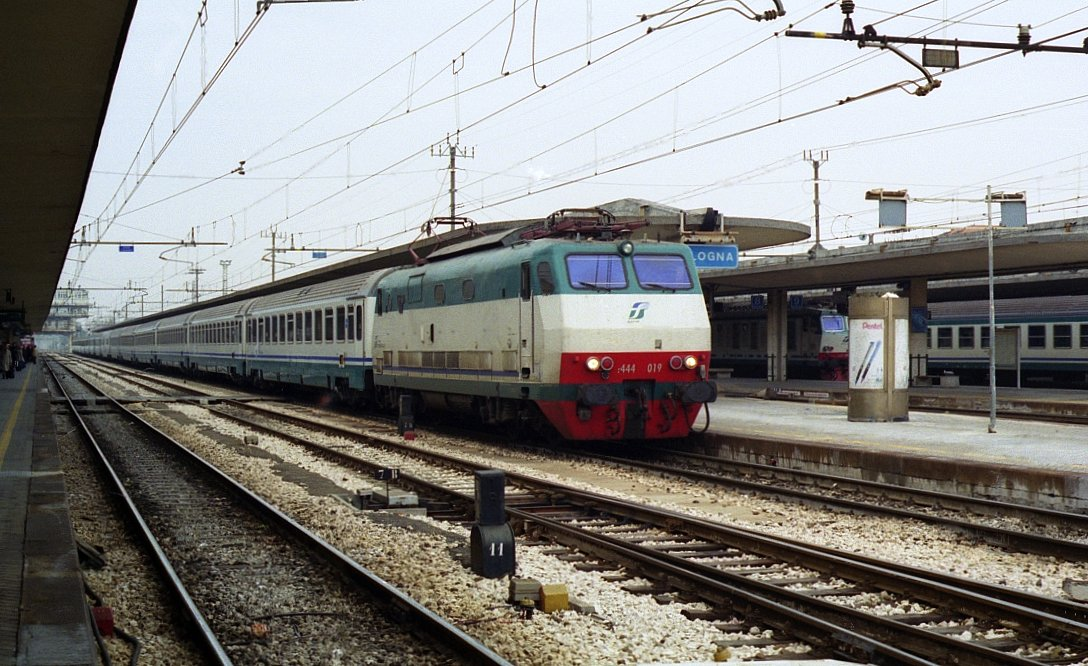
An Intercity train at Bologna Centrale railway station

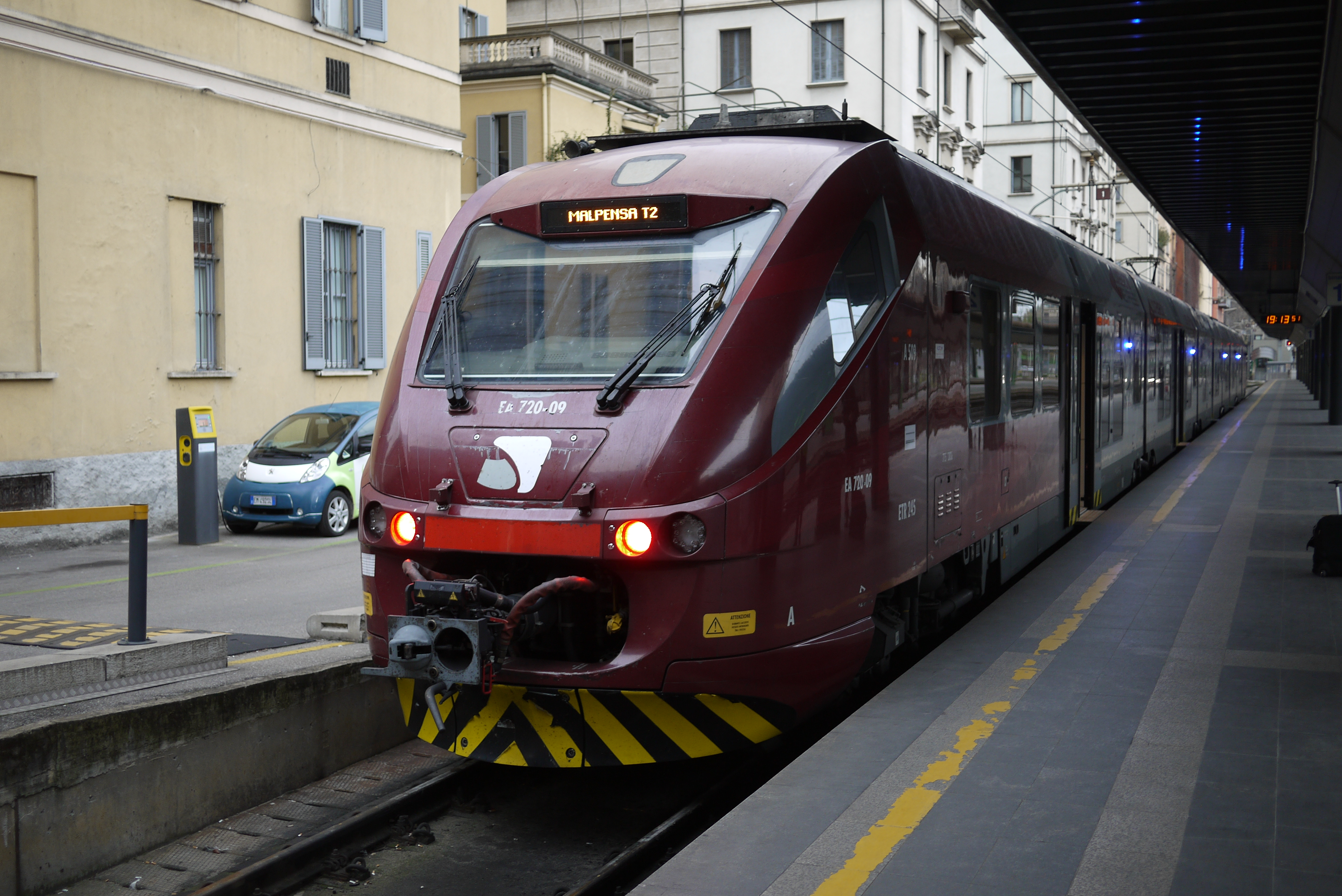
Malpensa Express

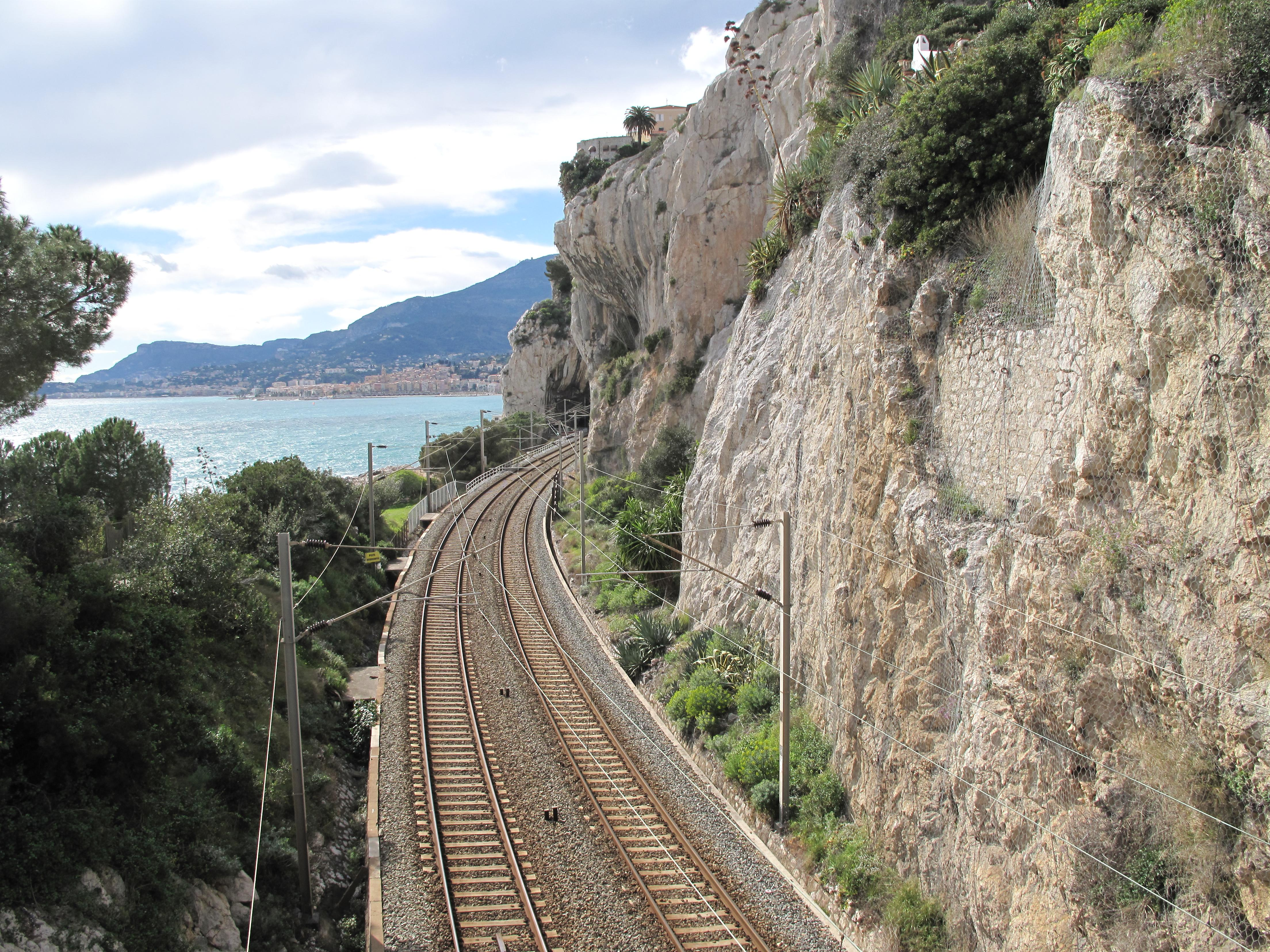
The Marseille-Vintimille railway line in Ventimiglia, near the French border

Companies certified to run railways in Italy are

From 2000

- Ferrovie dello Stato S.p. A.
- Trenitalia S.p. A.

From 2001

- Metronapoli S.p. A.
- Ferrovie Nord Milano Esercizio S.p. A.
- Rail Traction Company S.p. A.

From 2002

- Del Fungo Giera Servizi Ferroviari S.p. A.
- Gruppo Torinese Trasporti S.p. A.(ex SATTI)
- SERFER Servizi Ferroviari S.r.l.
- Hupac S.p. A.

From 2003

- Ferrovie Emilia Romagna S.r.l.
- La Ferroviaria Italiana S.p. A.
- Cargo Nord S.r.l.
- Ferrovie Adriatico Sangritana S.r.l.
- Sistemi Territoriali S.p. A.
- Strade Ferrate del Mediterraneo S.r.l.
- Swiss Rail Cargo Italy S.r.l.

From 2004

- SBB Cargo Italia S.r.l.
- Ferrovie Nord Cargo S.r.l.
- Azienda Consorziale Trasporti di Reggio Emilia
- Ferrovia Alifana e Benevento Napoli S.r.l.
- Ferrovie Nord Milano Trasporti S.r.l.

From 2005

- Trasporto Ferroviario Toscano S.p. A. (La Ferroviaria Italiana S.p. A.)
- Ferrovie Centrali Umbre S.r.l.
- Railion Italia S.r.l. (ex S.F.M.)
- Rail One S.p. A.
- Azienda Trasporti Collettivi e Mobilità S.p. A.
- A.T.C. Bologna S.p. A.
- Monferail S.r.l.

From 2006

- SAD - Trasporto Locale S.p.A.
- Nord Cargo S.r.l. (ex Ferrovie Nord Cargo S.r.l.)
- Arenaways S.p.A.

== Tribute ==
On 3 October 2019 Google celebrated the 180th anniversary of the first Italian railway inauguration with a Google Doodle.

== See also ==
- History of rail transport
- Ferrovie dello Stato
- Railway stations in Italy
- Trenitalia
- Treno Alta Velocità
- Railway network of Sicily
