= Santi Faustino e Giovita =

Santi Faustino e Giovita may refer to:

- Santi Faustino e Giovita, Brescia, a Roman Catholic church in Brescia, Italy
- Santi Faustino e Giovita, Chiari, a Roman Catholic church in Brescia, Italy
- Santi Faustino e Giovita, Montefiorino, a Roman Catholic church in Brescia, Italy
- Santi Faustino e Giovita, Rubiera, a Roman Catholic church in Brescia, Italy

== See also ==
- Faustinus and Jovita
