= Slut Boy Billy =

American-Italian-Ghanaian rapper

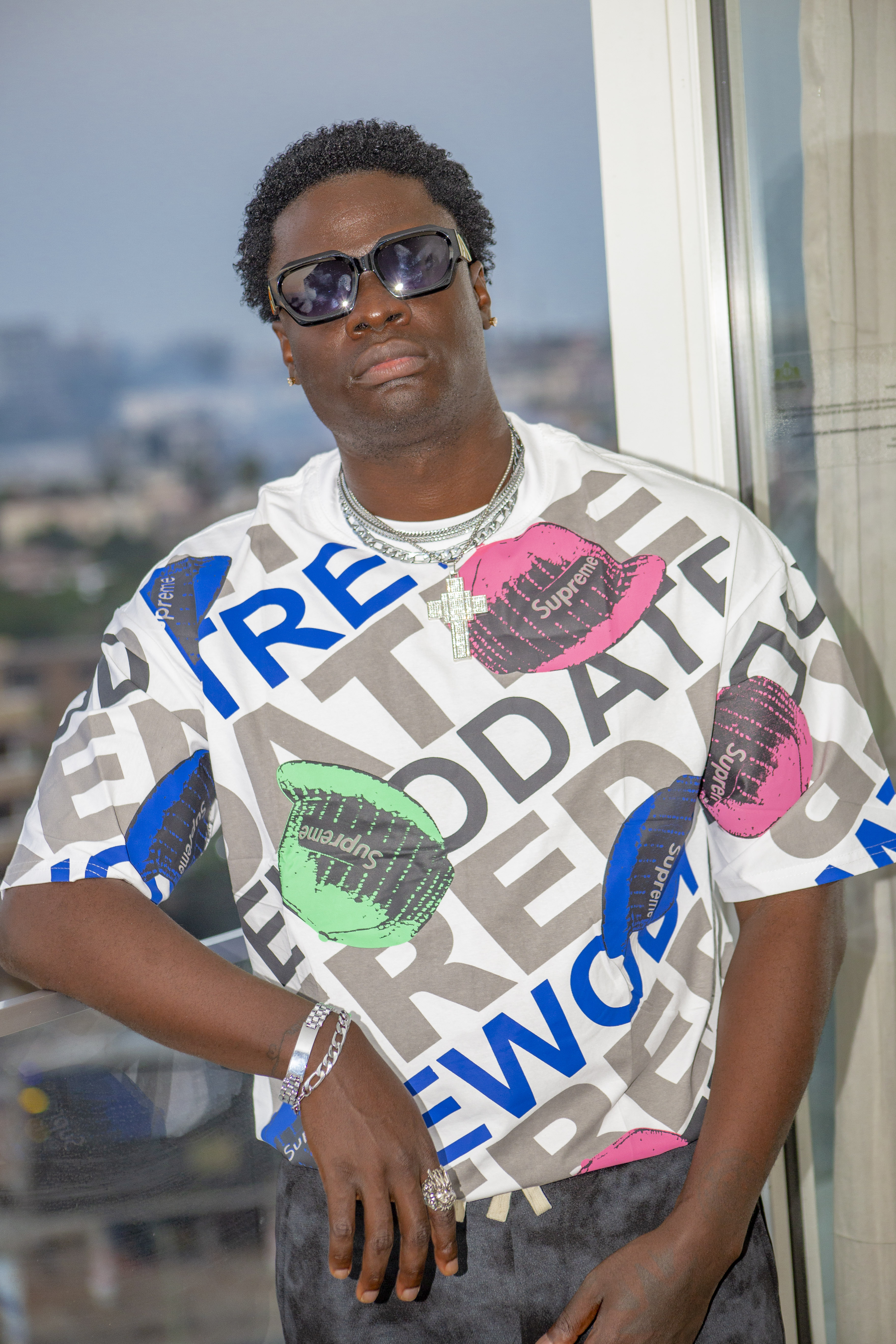
- Slut Boy Billy in 2024

Background information
- Also known as: Slutboy Billy
- Born: Billy Affou; August 25, 1998 (age 27); Chiari, Italy
- Origin: Ghana
- Genres: Hip Hop; Punk rap; Trap
- Occupations: Rapper, actor
- Years active: 2018–present

Billy Affou (popularly known as Slut Boy Billy or Slutboy Billy) is an American-Italian-Ghanaian rapper and actor. He previously worked under Yvonne Nelson’s production company but pulled out due to medical crisis. In 2023, his debut EP Mineral Rock surpassed one million streams on Boomplay and also debuted in the Top 100 of South Africa, Egypt, Turkey, Pakistan, Colombia, Bangladesh and Brazil.

== Early life ==
Affou was born on 25 August 1998 to Joseph A. Affou and Paulina A. Tayi in Chiari, Italy. He is the last and the second of the couple. He grew up in Pittsfield, Massachusetts, Berkshire County.

== Career ==
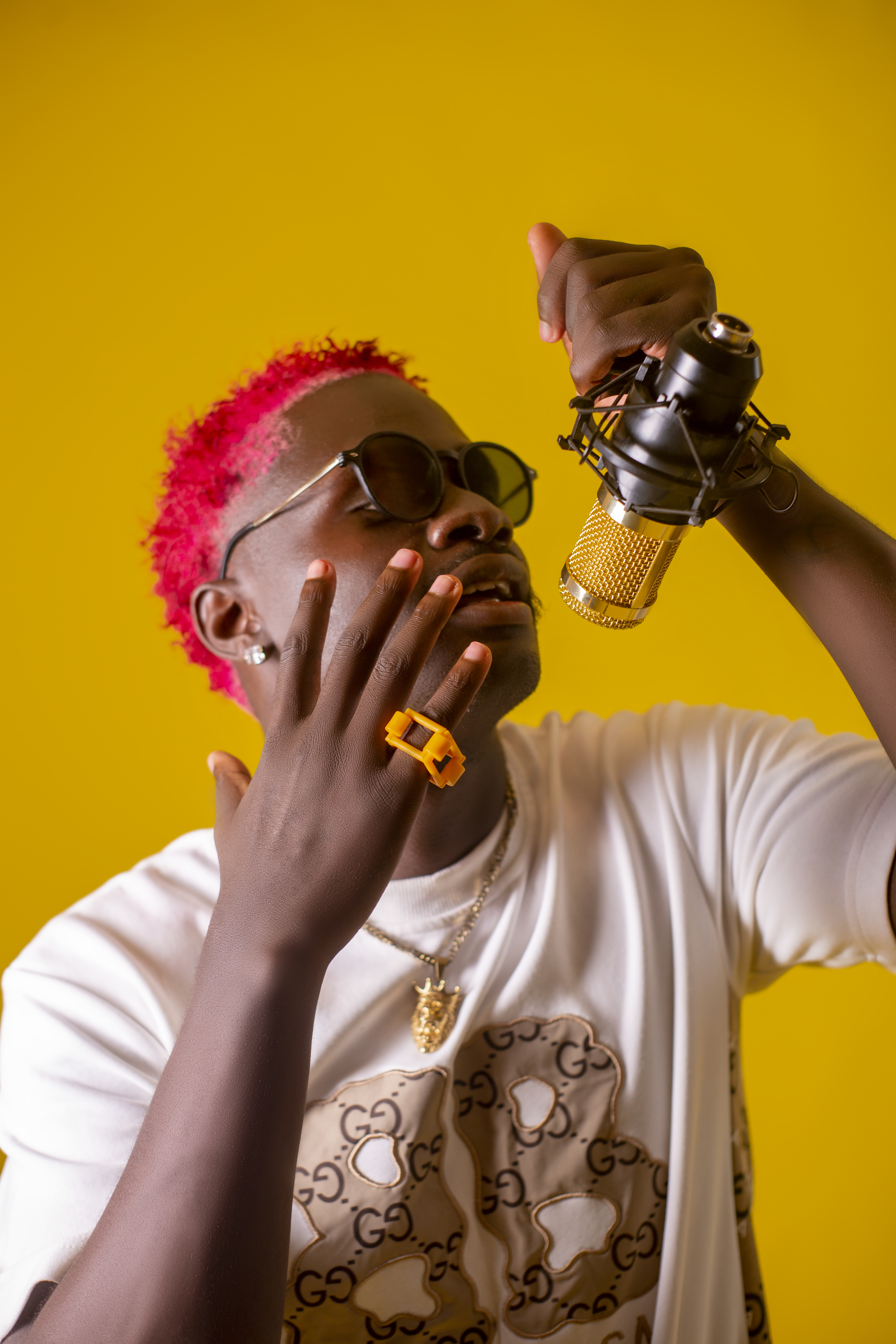
Slut Boy Billy with pink hair holding a mic

Affou began his music career in 2018 where he released his single Abracadabra. He was one of the headlined artistes for Akwanma Beach Concert which took place in Takoradi in the Western Region of Ghana.

In 2021, he also released Draco,

In 2022, he also released Eish featuring AGS Remedy, a fellow Ghanaian rapper.

In 2023, Affou released his debut EP, Mineral Rock with his producer Chensee Beatz.

In September 2024, he posted on his social media handle indicating an exit from the music industry.

In September 2025, Affou released his latest EP titled The Genesis of Eruption as a sign of his come back into the music industry.

== Personal life ==
Affou has three siblings Joyceline N. Affou, Antwan A. Williams, Lakisha Williams.

=== Criticism ===
In November 2023, he blamed the various Metropolitan, Municipal, and District Assemblies (MMDAs) in Ghana for their failure to maintain the environment and ensure safety.

== Controversy ==
In February 2023, he showed a nude photo of himself on his Instagram page.

== Discography ==
Singles

- Abradacabra (2020)
- Draco (2021)
- Eish feat. AGS Remedy (2022)
- "Am I Ever Gonna Find Love?" (2023)
- How Could You (2023)
- Refuse To Lose feat. Deerill Alldae (2023)
- Born Great feat. LoveTerp & Koo Wop (2023)
- Letter To Paitin (2025)
- My Baby (2025)
- Why (2025)
- Risky Love (2025)
- Tomorrow (2025)
- Meant To Be (2025)
EPs
- Mineral Rock (2023)
- Alternatively Atomic (2023)
- The Genesis of Eruption (2025)
