= Milan–Bologna high-speed railway =

Key northern Italian transport link

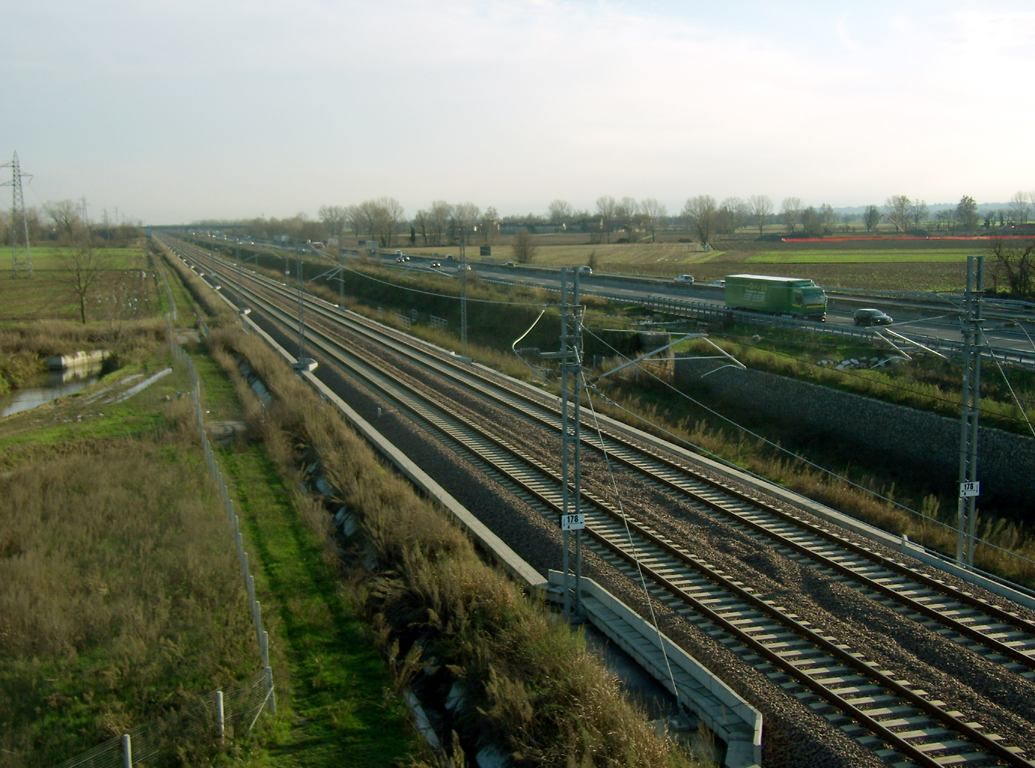
- The Milan–Bologna high-speed railway, next to the Autostrada del Sole, in the municipality of Pieve Fissiraga

Overview
- Termini: Milano Centrale; Bologna Centrale

History
- Opened: 1997 / 2008

Technical
- Line length: 214.694 km (133.405 mi)
- Number of tracks: 2
- Track gauge: 1,435 mm (4 ft 8 1/2 in) standard gauge
- Electrification: 25 kV AC (Tavazzano con Villavesco-Castelfranco Emilia); 3 kV DC (Milan-Tavazzano con Villavesco and Castelfranco Emilia-Bologna)
- Operating speed: 300 km/h (190 mph)

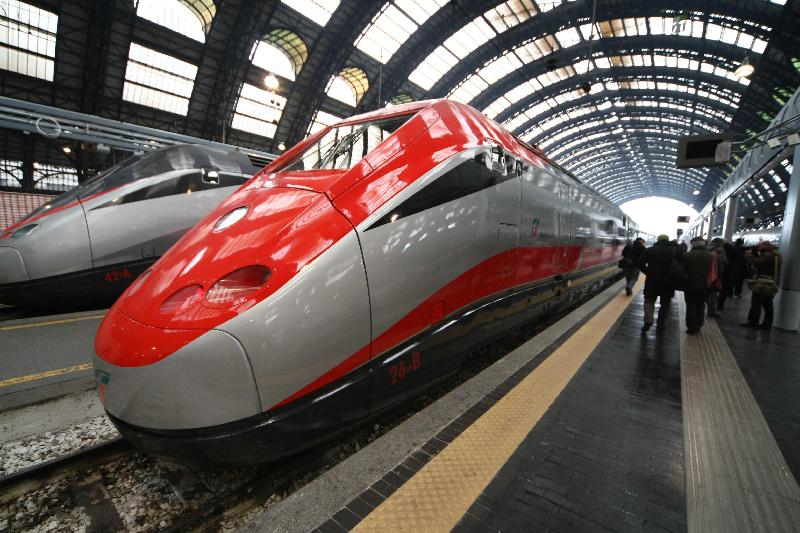
High speed train ETR500 at Milan Central Station

The Milan–Bologna high-speed railway is a railway line that links the cities of Milan and Bologna, part of the Italian high-speed rail network. It runs parallel to the historical north–south railway between Milan and Bologna, which itself follows the ancient Roman Road, the Via Aemilia. The new railway follows the Autostrada A1 closely for much of its length. The new line allows faster traffic to run separated and increase the overall railway capacity between the two cities.

The line is part of Corridor 1 of the European Union's Trans-European high-speed rail network, which connects Berlin to Palermo. The line is 214 kilometers (133 mi) long from the Milano Centrale to Bologna Centrale station, with trains taking about 1 hour and 5 minutes to cover the distance.

The first section of the line on the outskirts of Milan was opened in 1997. A 15 km (9.3 mi) section between Bologna and Modena was opened for freight traffic in September 2006 and for passenger traffic in October 2007. The rest of the route was opened to commercial traffic on 13 December 2008 to coincide with the main European timetable change. The Bologna–Florence high-speed line, the remaining Milan–Novara section of the Milan–Turin high-speed line and the Gricignano di Aversa–Naples section of the Rome–Naples high-speed line opened to traffic in December 2009, completing the high speed line from Turin to Salerno, except for a planned underground level at Bologna and a new station in Florence. The underground level at Bologna was opened on 8 June 2013.

== History ==
The proposal to build a high speed line from Milan to Bologna was announced by the Italian rail operator Ferrovie dello Stato (FS) in January 1988. The proposal was slowed by legal actions related to several corruption investigations, which led to the Tangentopoli scandal. On 15 October 1991 FS established a new company, Treno Alta Velocità SpA (TAV), to plan, build and manage the new Italian high-speed lines. Its design was approved on 21 December 1993, leading to the commencement of the process to gain environmental and governmental approvals for the route. Final approvals were gained for the project in the Bologna area and between Milan and Parma on 23 July 1997 and for the rest of the route on 31 July 1998. On 15 March 2000, TAV, Italferr (FS's engineering division) and the ENI/CEPAV UNO consortium signed a contract to build the line. Construction works were initially expected to take 69 months at an expense of €4.9 billion. In fact, it ended up taking 96 months and costing €6.9 billion.

The first section of the new Milan-Bologna was opened in 1997 between Milan Rogoredo and Sordio junction. The new line was built to trunk line standards, rather than as a high-speed railway and was electrified at the traditional 3,000 V DC, rather than the 25 kV AC to be applied to the main high-speed section.

Construction of the rest of the new line started in 2002 under the direction of TAV. On 29 May 2005 the new line was extended south to Melegnano-Tavazzano and the temporary junction at Sordio was closed. On 11 September 2006 the trunkline between Castelfranco Emilia and Lavino was brought into operation, while the section between Lavino and Santa Viola was opened on 10 October 2007.

In November 2007 the laying of tracks and the provision of technological systems and electrical equipment was completed for the rest of the new line. Testing of systems in preparation for its opening started on 16 December 2007. During these tests, at 17:23 on 1 March 2008, a new Italian railway speed record of 355 km/h (221 mph) was set by an ETR 500-Y near Parma, beating the previous record of 352.026 km/h (218.739 mph) which had been set on 25 May 2006 by an ETR 500-Y test train on the Torino–Novara section of the Milan–Turin high-speed line.

The railway line between Melegnano and Castelfranco east junctions was opened for training on 2 October 2008. Consequently, the tracks between the Melegnano and Tavazzano junctions and between Castelfranco station and Emilia Castefranco east junction became interconnection lines between the traditional and the AV-AC lines. The opening of the line took place on 13 December 2008 with an inaugural trip made by an ETR 500 Frecciarossa, classified as ES* 29405, with a load of journalists and politicians. The line was opened to commercial traffic the next day, with the introduction of the new Trenitalia timetable.

== Features of the line ==
The line follows closely the Autostrada A1 for 182 kilometers (113 mi) of its total 214-kilometer (133 mi) length. The line runs for 32 kilometers (20 mi) on viaducts and for 3 kilometers (1.9 mi) in tunnel, the rest being at-grade. The design-speed of the line is 300 kilometers per hour (190 mph), leading to the adoption of a minimum radius of curvature of 5,450 meters (17,880 ft); however, in Modena restrictions on the route led to a minimum radius of 3,450 meters (11,320 ft), limiting the maximum speed there to 240 km/h (150 mph).

The railway line is a double-track standard gauge railway built with Vignoles profile 60 kg/m (40 lb/ft) rail. From Milano Centrale station to Melegnano junction and from Castelfranco east junction to Bologna Centrale station the line is electrified at 3 kV DC; in between those two section it is electrified at 25 kV AC 50 hertz. Connections with the traditional line are electrified at 3 kV DC.

== Route ==
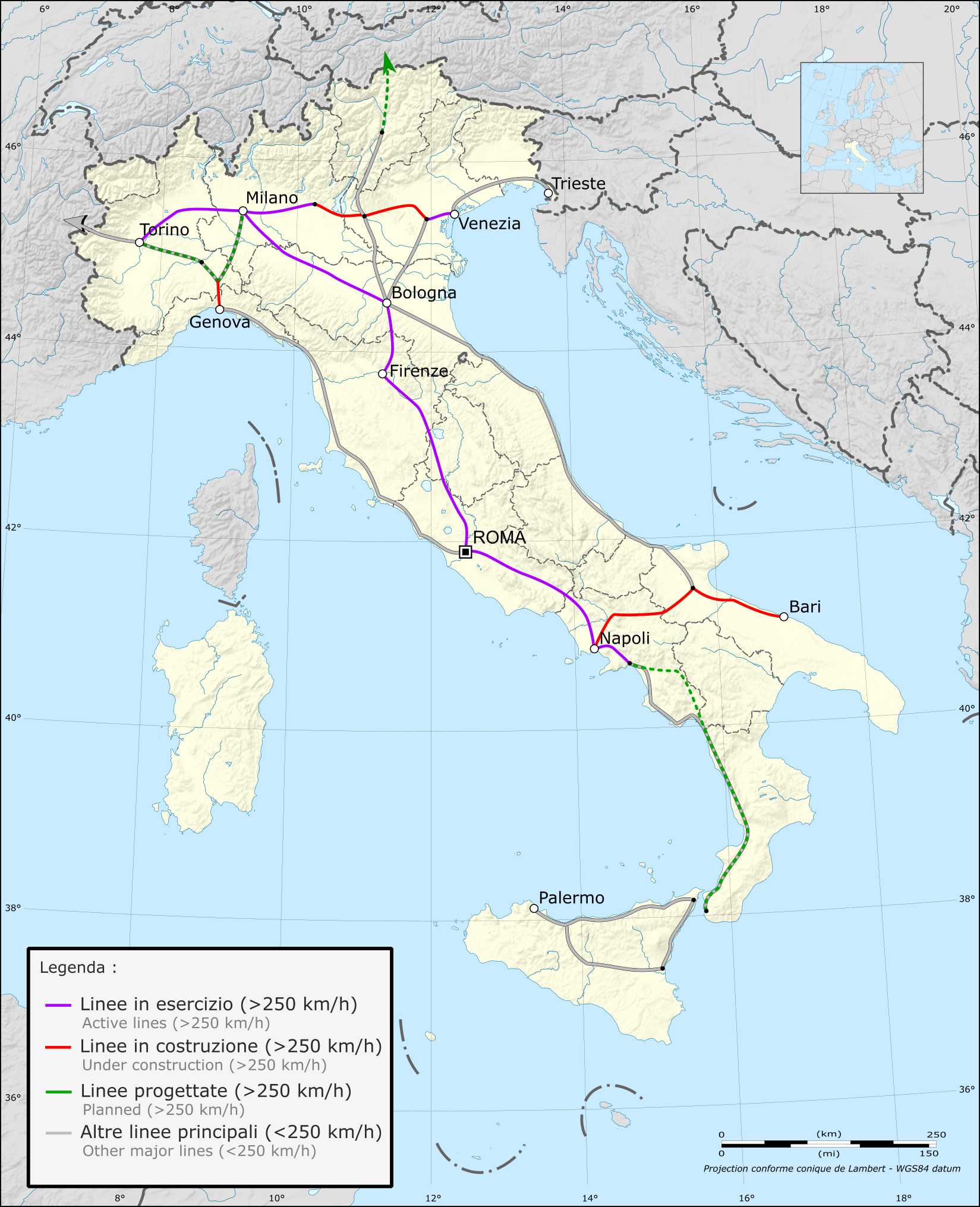
Map of Italian high-speed and higher speed rail network

=== Milan railway junction ===
Starting from Milano Centrale station, trains bound for Bologna use the Milan belt railway or sometimes the Genova line, which links Milano Centrale with Milano Lambrate and Milano Rogoredo railway stations. During this journey, the train branches to the right at a junction with the "passenger" line, used by trains to and from the Milano–Domodossola line (to Domodossola, the Simplon Tunnel and Switzerland) and the Milan-Turin line to Turin. It branches to the right again at a junction with the Chiasso line (used by trains to and from Chiasso to the Gotthard Rail Tunnel and Switzerland), which also connects with the Milan-Lecco railway to Lecco.

At Milan Lambrate the belt railway connects with the lines from Milano Certosa station and to Milano Rogoredo, the Milan–Verona high-speed line and the traditional Milan–Venice line. After Lambrate, the Pioltello branch of the Milan Passante suburban railway passes under the line.

=== Milano Rogoredo to Piacenza east ===
At Milano Rogoredo station the high-speed line separates from the traditional line near San Giuliano Milanese so that it can bypass the centre of Melegnano. After Melegnano the high-speed line passes the location of the former Sordo junction, which was closed after the extension of the high-speed line to Melegnano junction at Tavazzano. After the old Sordio junction, the line separated from the traditional line and joins the Autostrada del Sole (A1 motorway). Trains to and from Lodi that do not need to stop between Rogoredo and Lodi can join the new line at Melegnano junction. At the junction the electrification of the high-speed line changes 3,000 V DC to 25,000 V AC 50 Hz, which is to be used on almost all high-speed lines in Italy. The signalling system also changes to the modern European Rail Traffic Management System (ERTMS) near the junction, at the 190.229 km (118.203 mi) mark (measured from Bologna).

At Somaglia the railway enters a 1,019-meter-long (3,343 ft) cut-and-cover tunnel above which a park is being built to mitigate the environmental impact of the autostrada, which the line will move away from near Santo Stefano Lodigiano. To the south of this town is Piacenza west junction, where a line connects the AV/AC to the traditional Milan-Bologna line to serve Piacenza station, where passengers can change to and from trains operating on the traditional, the Alessandria-Voghera-Piacenza and the Cremona-Piacenza lines.

After Piacenza west junction, the railway runs on a viaduct across the traditional line and the Po River near the village of Olevano di Lomellina. After passing over the A21 motorway and the SS 10 highway, the line will connect with the rail Cremona-Piacenza line at the uncompleted Piacenza east junction, when it is opened to traffic, allowing trains between Piacenza and Bologna to travel on the high speed line.

=== From Piacenza east to Reggio Emilia AV station ===
Shortly after Piacenza east junction, the railway rejoins the A1 and runs next to it until P.M. Piacenza, which has two crossovers to enable trains to transfer between tracks at up to 160 km/h (99 mph), if necessary. Approximately 15 kilometers (9.3 mi) after P.M. Piacenza is Fidenza west junction, which enables trains to be routed via the Fidenza-Cremona line towards Fidenza station, where passengers can transfer to the Pontremoli line to La Spezia. The grade-separated junction is located near the village of Castione Marchesi.

Just north of the cut-and-cover tunnel where the line passes Fontanellato is P.C. Fontanellato, which is an identical set of crossovers to P.C. Piacenza. The line crosses the Taro River east of the exit to the Fontanellato tunnel on a long viaduct, which continues for much of the route north of Parma. To the south-east of the village of Parma Chiozzola is the grade-separated junction at Parma east, which connects Parma station on the traditional line to the high-speed line towards Bologna. Parma station is a meeting point of several regional and state railways, the Pontremoli, the Parma-Brescia and the Parma-Suzzara lines, but the junction can also be used by direct trains between the Pontremoli line and Bologna. The interconnection between the high-speed and traditional lines at Parma east, unlike the others, required the redesign of some trackwork—connecting trains use the line from Suzzara (subsequently joining the line from Brescia) and their connection with the traditional line in Parma is being rebuilt.

After passing the East Parma east junction, the line continues beside the A1. Near the village of La Razza in Campegine is P.M. Campegine, which has two crossovers that allow trains to transfer between tracks at up to 160 km/h (99 mph). Reggio Emilia AV Mediopadana railway station, which was designed by Santiago Calatrava, is located nine km further south, just to the north of the Reggio Emilia viaduct that overpasses the Reggio Emilia–Guastalla line near the fairground. It provides an interchange with a regional railway line and buses and was completed on 8 June 2013. The site was previously only equipped with two temporary crossovers with a speed limit of 60 km/h (37 mph) on transferring trains.

=== From Reggio Emilia AV station to Bologna ===
After P.M. Reggio Emilia AV, the line continues to follow the A1 until P.C. Rubiera. This location service is located between the villages of Fontana and Osteria and has two 160 km/h (99 mph) crossovers. Further south the line moves away from A1 to the east in order to bypass the town of Modena to its north on a curve with a radius requires AV trains to observe lower than normal speed limits.

To the north of the village of Villanova is Modena west junction that allows the routing of trains on to the line to Mantua and Verona towards Modena station. After Modena west junction, the railway cuts through the countryside north of Modena and then bend towards the south-east in the direction of Castelfranco Emilia and Manzolini. Near the town of Castelfranco Cavazzona is the Castelfranco east junction, where the line rejoins the traditional line. At this junction trains between Modena and Bologna change between the high speed and traditional lines. The voltage change between 25,000 V AC 3000 V DC occurs at this point.

At Anzola dell'Emilia is P.M. Anzola dell'Emilia, which is a junction that allows trains to connect to P.M. Lavino, on the traditional line in order to connect with take the belt railway around Bologna. Shortly before Santa Viola station, the ERTMS signalling system changes to the traditional Italian signalling system. In the vicinity of the Reno crossover there are two other interconnections with the historical line that run towards the set of crossovers of the site of the former Santa Viola station: one serves to facilitate the entry and exit of trains towards Milan and the other to facilitate the corresponding movement of trains towards Bologna. From the Santa Viola crossovers, it is possible, therefore, to reach the surface level of Bologna Centrale station, as well as to route trains to the Porrettana and Verona–Bologna lines.

Shortly after the entrance to the tunnel of the Bologna Passante, which allows the line to pass under the city of Bologna, is Venezia (Venice) junction, a double-track grade-separated interconnection that opened for operation in December 2017, allowing trains coming from the Padua line to enter the underground station.

The trains finally arrive at the underground level of Bologna Centrale, making a stop and then continue towards Florence along the high-speed line.

== Services ==
Trenitalia commenced services on the line on 14 December 2008, with 24 Eurostar AV services operating between Milan and Rome in each direction each day. Most of these stop at Bologna and Florence and since the acceleration of services with the opening of the Bologna–Florence high-speed line on 13 December 2009 take 3 hours 30 minutes. Ten services southbound and nine services northbound operate non-stop, taking 2 hours 59 minutes—these are branded as Eurostar AV Fast. An additional Eurostar also operates each day each way, stopping at Piacenza, Fidenza, Parma, Reggio Emilia and Modena and taking 4 hours and 58 minutes. The fastest AV Fast services take 2 hours 45 minutes between Milano Rogoredo station and Roma Tiburtina station.
