= Chiari railway station =

Railway station in Italy

Chiari
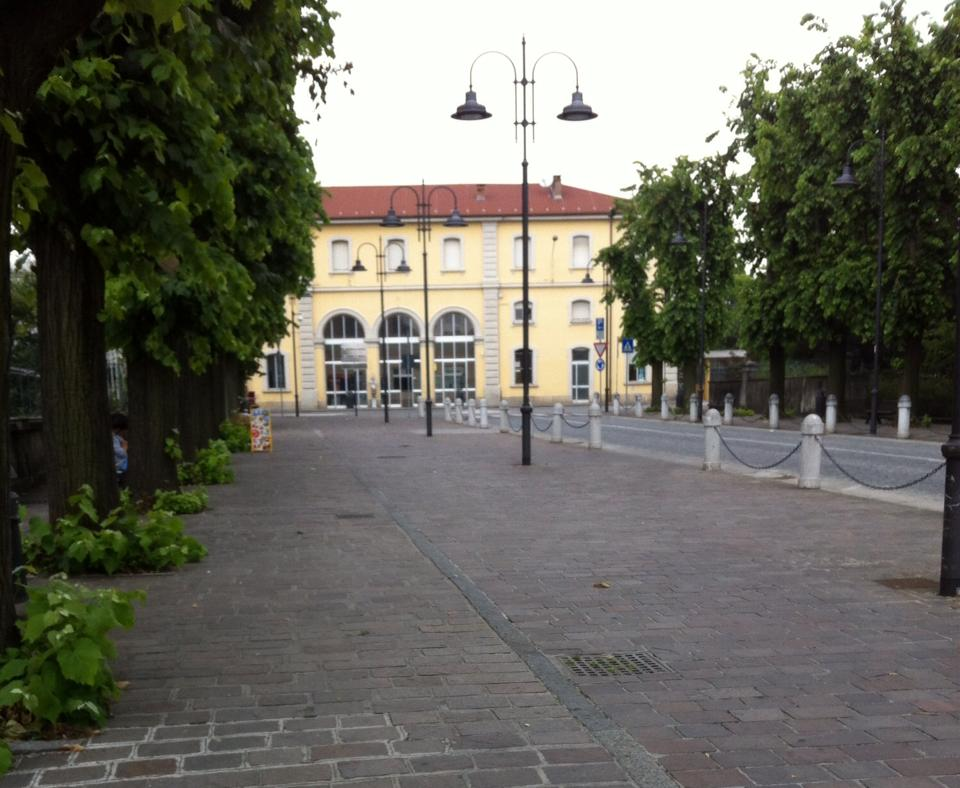
- Chiari railway station

General information
- Location: Viale Marconi 1, Chiari, Lombardy; Italy
- Coordinates: 45°32′23″N 09°55′33″E
- Owner: Rete Ferroviaria Italiana
- Operator: Trenord
- Line: Milan–Venice railway
- Distance: 59.778 km (37.144 mi) from Milano Centrale
- Platforms: 3
- Tracks: 3

Other information
- Classification: Silver

History
- Opened: 1878; 148 years ago
Location
- Location within Lombardy Location within Northern Italy Location within Italy

Chiari (Italian: Stazione di Chiari) is a railway station serving the town of Chiari, in the region of Lombardy, northern Italy. The station opened in 1878 and is located on the Milan–Venice railway. The train services are operated by Trenord.

== History ==
Between 1898 and 1915, the station was the southern terminus of the Iseo-Rovato-Chiari tramway.

== Train services ==
The station is served by the following service(s):

- Express services (Treno regionale) Milan - Treviglio - Brescia - Verona
- Regional services (Treno regionale) Sesto San Giovanni - Milan - Treviglio - Brescia

== See also ==
- History of rail transport in Italy
- List of railway stations in Lombardy
- Rail transport in Italy
- Railway stations in Italy
