= Milan–Monza railway =

Railway line in Italy

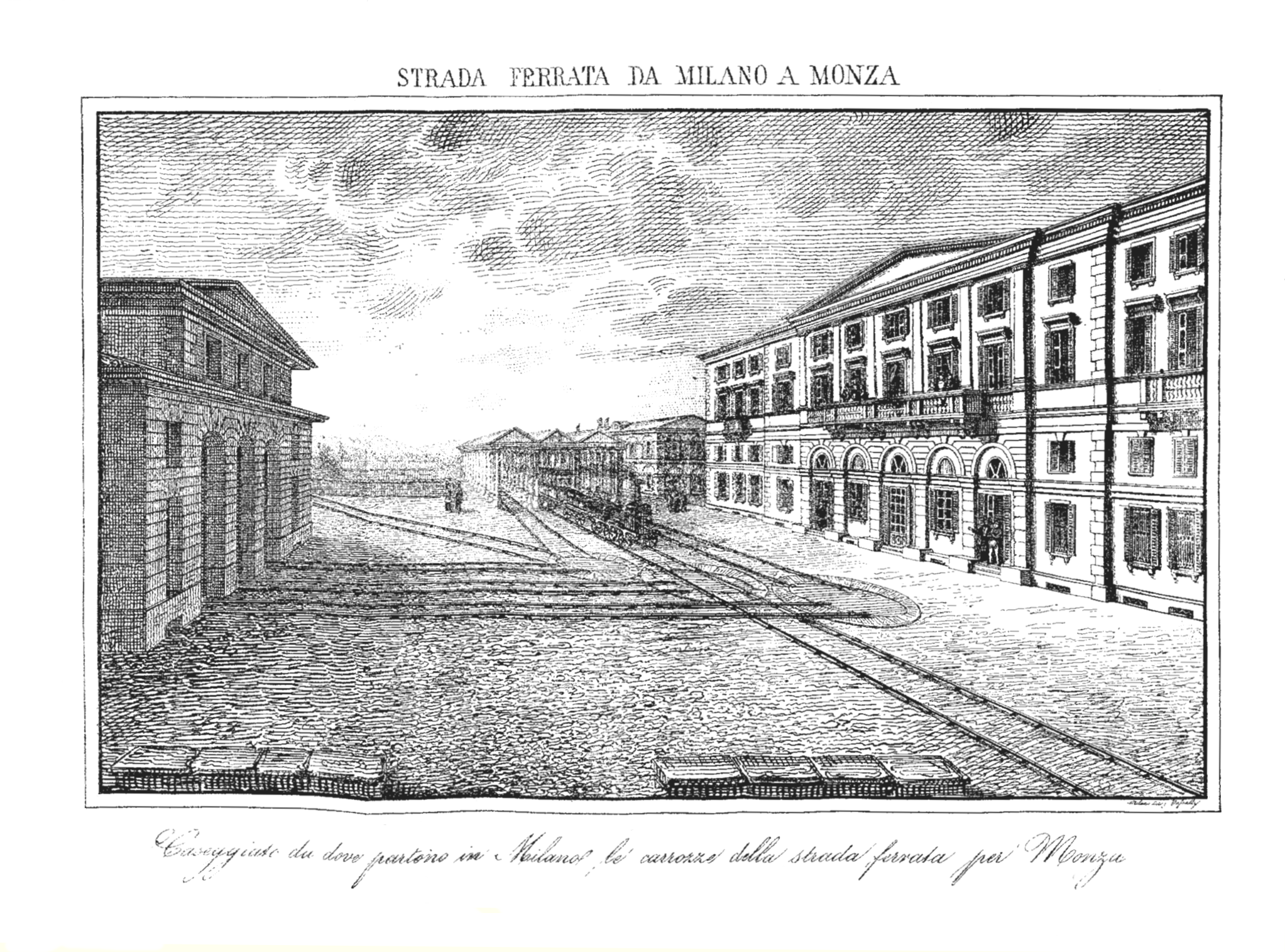
- Porta Nuova Station, Milan, 1840

Overview
- Native name: Imperial-Regia Privilegiata Strada Ferrata da Milano a Monza (Italian)
- Locale: Lombardy

History
- Opened: 1840; 186 years ago

Technical
- Line length: 8 miles (13 km)
- Track gauge: 4 ft 8 1/2 in (1,435 mm) standard gauge
Route map
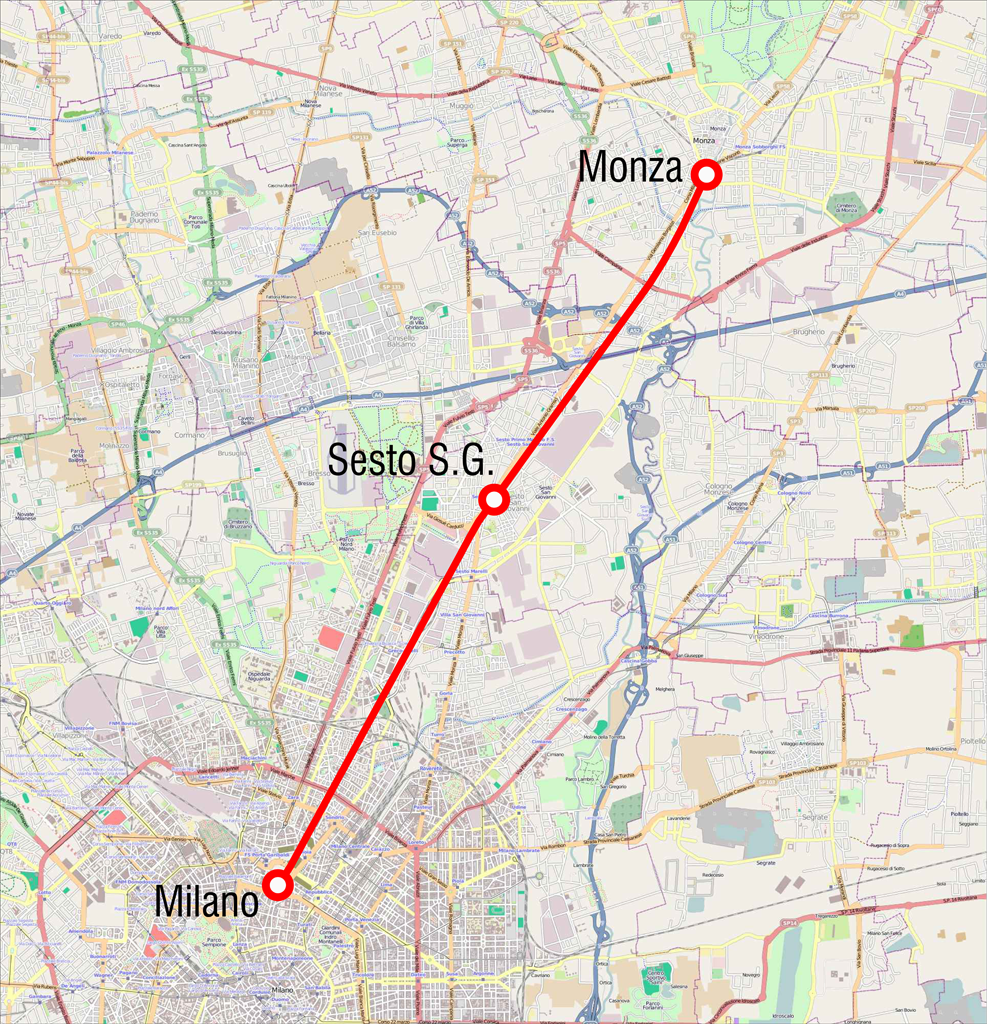

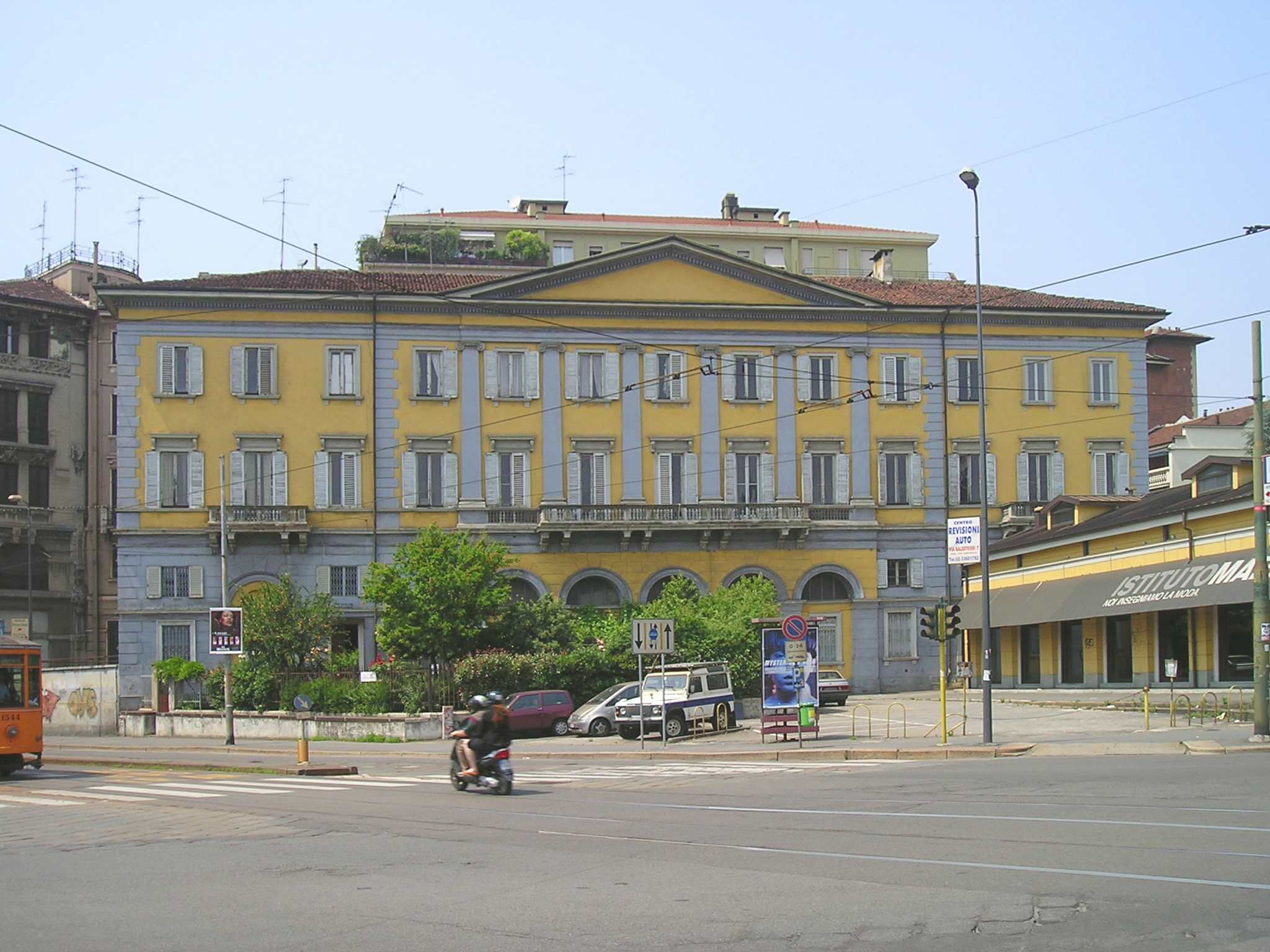
The original Porta Nuova Station in Milan

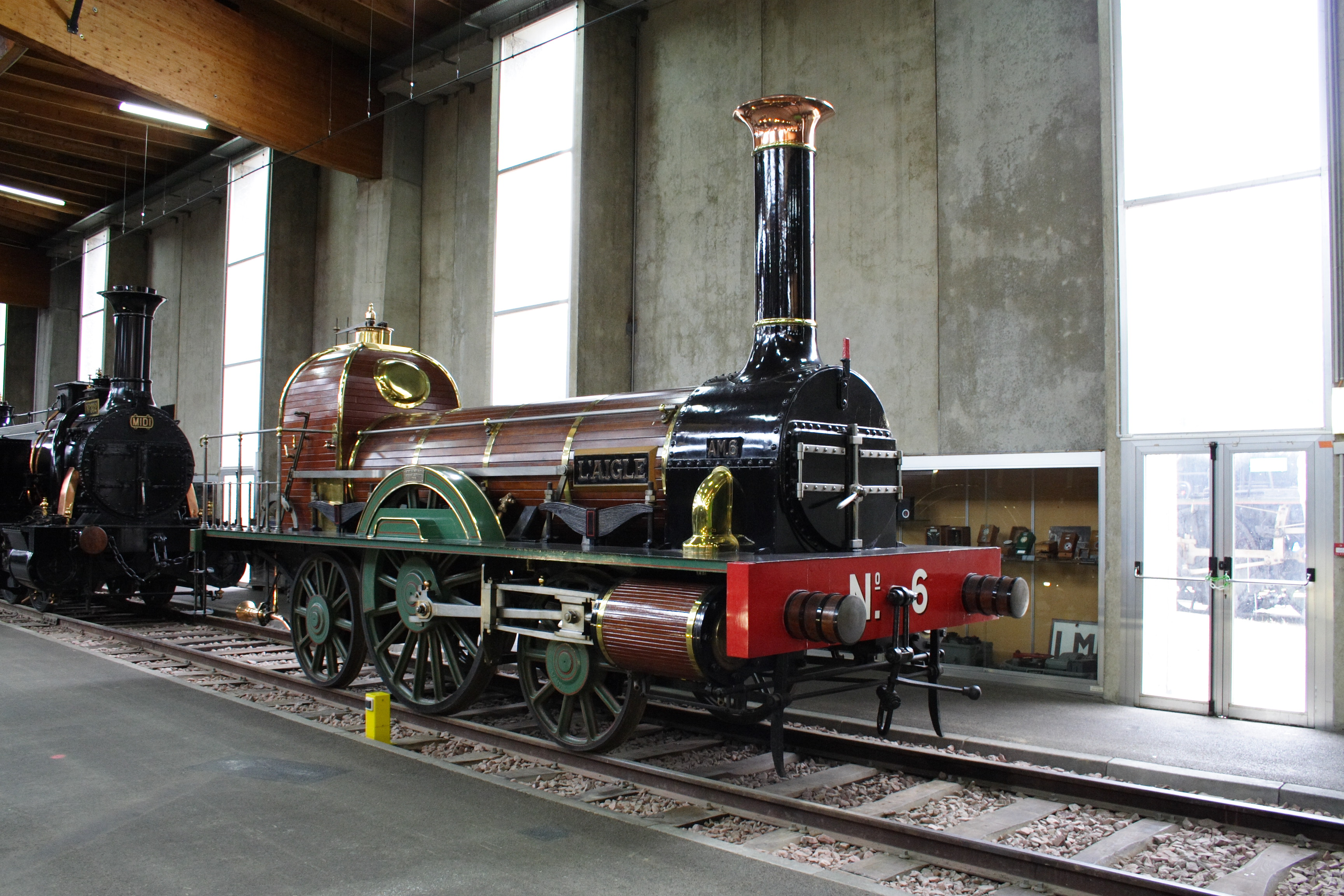
Locomotives similar to this Robert Stephenson locomotive were used initially

The Milan–Monza railway line is the second oldest railway in Italy. It was the first railway in the Kingdom of Lombardy–Venetia, part of the Austrian Empire, opening in 1840 as the Imperial-Regia Privilegiata Strada Ferrata da Milano a Monza ("Imperial and Royal Privileged Railway from Milan to Monza") and was 12.8 kilometres (8.0 mi) long.

== History ==
In November 1839 the Austrian Emperor Ferdinand I of Austria authorized construction of the railroad by the Holzhammer Company, owned by the aristocrat Giovanni Putzer. Planning was by the Italian engineer Giulio Sarti. In one year the railway was built with two stations, the Porta Nuova Station in Milan and the Monza Station. It had rails mounted on large cubic stone sunk into the ground and gauge was maintained from time to time with transverse bars. The line was opened for service on 18 August 1840. The line was straight and the movement of trains was supervised by signalmen in high masonry towers along the line who communicated the movement of trains with optical and acoustic signals.

Trains operated four return trips each day—which was soon increased to six—with a time of about 20 minutes. The railway equipment included three English steam locomotives built by George Rennie and Robert Stephenson, named Lombardia, Milano and Lambro, and 21 passenger cars. The terminal stations were at Porta Nuova in Milan and Monza and there was an intermediate station at Sesto San Giovanni. By the end of 1840, 150,000 passengers had been carried. The original station was replaced by a new station nearby also called Porta Nuova in 1850, which was in turn replaced by a new through station called Milano Centrale in 1864. The original Milano Centrale station was replaced by the modern terminal station of Milano Centrale, built by Ulisse Stacchini between 1924-31. However, most passenger trains have been routed to Milano Porta Garibaldi (opened in 1963 near the old Porta Nuova stations) since the opening of a tunnel connecting it with the Monza line in 1966.

The line now forms part of the Milan–Chiasso line; the line to Lecco connects Monza to the Valtellina region.

== Bibliography ==
- Bruschetti, Giuseppe (1840). "Sulla scelta delle linee per le strade di ferro in Lombardia". Biblioteca Italiana Ossia Giornale di Letteratura Scienze ed Arti (in Italian). 98. Milan: Stella Antonio Fortunato: 92–122.
- Possenti, Carlo (1841). Le strade ferrate in Lombardia (in Italian). Milan: Editore librajo Angelo Monti.
- Sulla costituzione della Società del sud dell'Austria e dell'alta Italia (in Italian). Milan: Stabilimento Giuseppe Civelli. 1876.
- "Le strade ferrate della Lombardia". L'Edilizia Moderna. IV (VII, VIII). Milan: Stab. Tip. Arturo Demarchi Edit.: 53–56 1895.
- "Le corse elettriche sulla ferrovia Milano-Monza". Monitore delle Strade Ferrate. XXXII (6). Turin: Tip. del monitore delle strade ferrate: 81–83. 1899.
- Crispo, Antonio (1940). Le Ferrovie italiane: storia politica ed economica (in Italian). Milan: Giuffré.
- Brusetti, Lorenzo; Cogliati, Massimo (2010). La ferrovia Milano-Lecco nella gran linea delle Alpi (in Italian). Annone Brianza: Cattaneo editore. ISBN 978-8886509954.
- Pardi, Onofrio (1967). "Estensione del quadruplo binario di corsa sulla linea Milano-Monza". Ingegneria Ferroviaria. XXII (12): 1085–1091. ISSN 0020-0956.
- Pulga, Pietro (1971). "Realizzazione del quadruplo binario di corsa sulla linea Milano-Monza". Ingegneria Ferroviaria. XXVI (10): 967–972. ISSN 0020-0956.
- Orsenigo, Mario; Vuerich, Mauro (1989). Dal bastone pilota alla marcia parallela. Rome: CIFI.
- Columba, Cesare (1989). Strade ferrate, stazioni, territorio (1839-1848). Rome: CIFI.
- Moretti, Mario (1990). "Da Milano a Monza nel 1840". I Treni Oggi (109). Salò: Editrice Trasporti su Rotaie: 26–29. ISSN 0392-4602.
