= Arquata Scrivia railway station =

Railway station in Italy

Arquata Scrivia
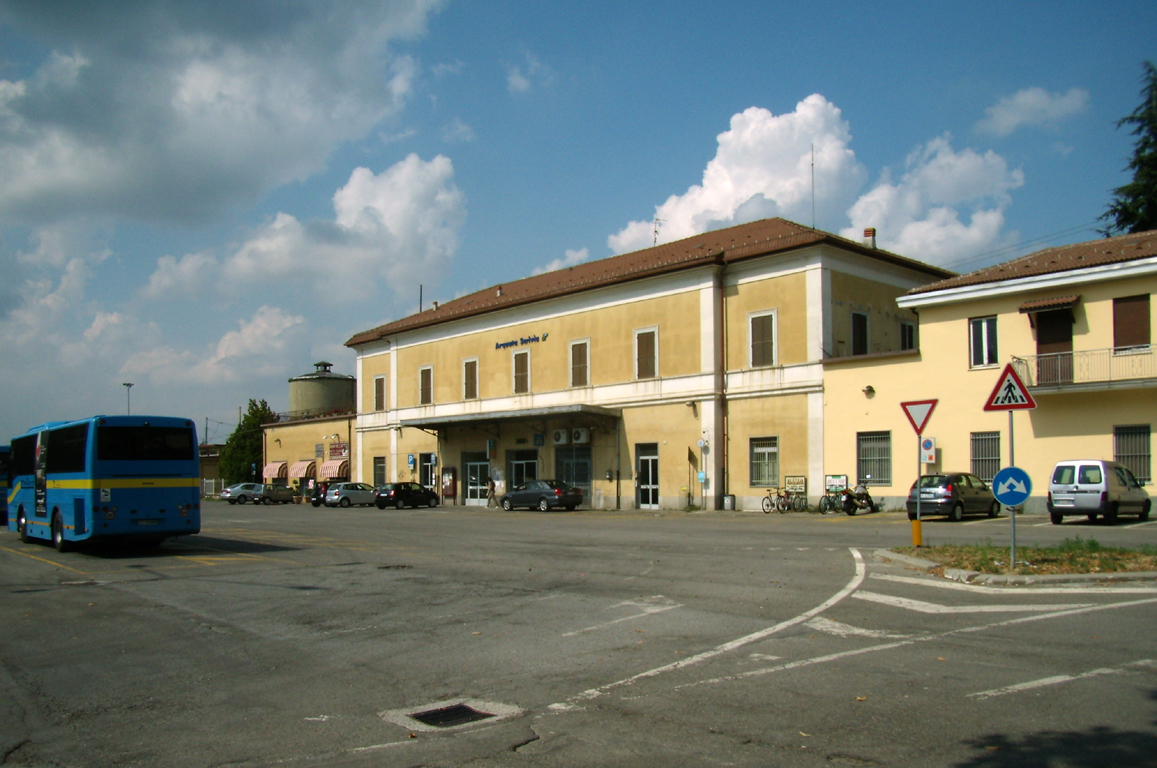

General information
- Location: Piazza della Repubblica 6, Arquata Scrivia; Arquata Scrivia, Alessandria, Piedmont; Italy
- Coordinates: 44.6923°N 8.8850°E
- Owner: Rete Ferroviaria Italiana
- Operator: Rete Ferroviaria Italiana
- Lines: Turin–Genoa; Milan–Genoa
- Train operators: Trenitalia

Other information
- Classification: Silver

History
- Opened: 1889

Services
| Preceding station | Trenitalia | Following station |
|---|---|---|
| Serravalle Scrivia towards Torino Porta Nuova | Regionale Veloce; Turin–Genoa | Ronco Scrivia towards Genova Brignole |
| Tortona towards Milano Centrale | Regionale Veloce; Genoa–Milan | Ronco Scrivia towards Genova Piazza Principe |
Location
- Location within Piedmont Location within Northern Italy Location within Italy

Arquata Scrivia railway station (Italian: Stazione di Arquata Scrivia) serves the town and comune of Arquata Scrivia, in the Piedmont region, Alessandria province in northwestern Italy. It is located at the junction of the Turin–Genoa and Milan–Genoa lines.

== Services ==
As of the June 2025 timetable change, the following services stop at Arquata Scrivia:

- Regionale Veloce: service to Torino Porta Nuova, Genova Brignole / Genova Piazza Principe, and Milano Centrale.
