= Memoriale della Shoah =

Holocaust memorial in Milan, Italy

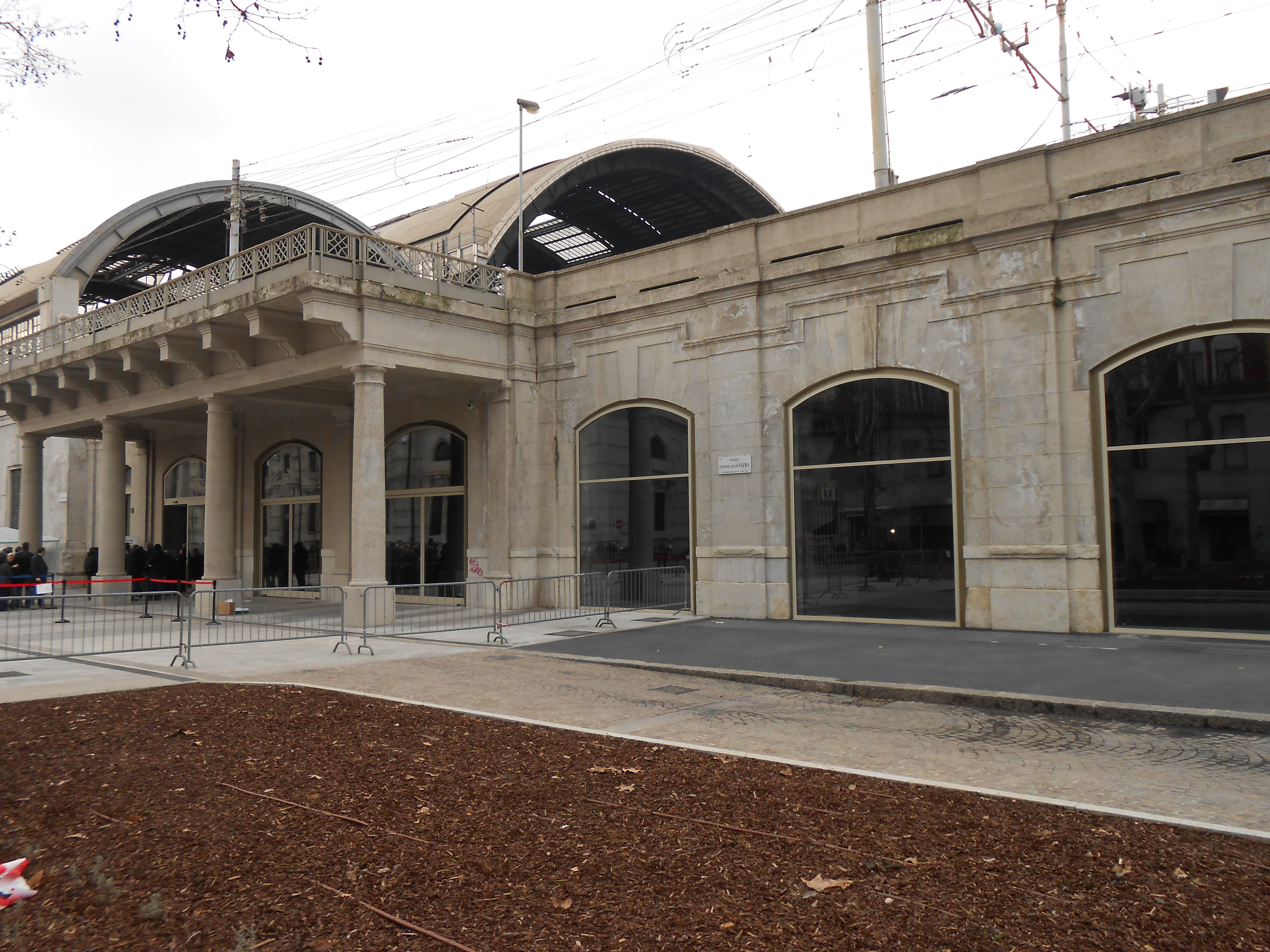
- Entry to the Memoriale della Shoah

- Memoriale della Shoah
- Established: 2013
- Location: Milan, Lombardy, Italy
- Coordinates: 45°29′10″N 9°12′13″E
- Type: Holocaust memorial
- Website: www.memorialeshoah.it

The Memoriale della Shoah is a Holocaust memorial at the Milano Centrale railway station commemorating the Jewish prisoners deported from there during the Holocaust in Italy. Jewish prisoners from the San Vittore Prison, Milan, were taken from there to a secret underground platform, Platform 21 (Italian: Binario 21), to be loaded on freight cars and taken on Holocaust trains to extermination camps, either directly or via other transit camps. Twenty trains and up to 1,200 Jewish prisoners left Milan in this fashion to be murdered, predominantly at Auschwitz.

== Milan during the German occupation ==
=== Background ===
After the Italian surrender on 8 September 1943 and the occupation of northern Italy by German forces, Milan became a centre for processing, interrogating and torturing captured resistance fighters and Jews, which was carried out by both the German police and the Italian Muti police unit. Prisoners were held at San Vittore Prison, but were also taken for interrogation and torture at either the headquarters of the German police at Hotel Regina or at the headquarter of the Muti unit in an army base at Via Rovello.

The German police in Milan was under the command of SS-Sturmbannführer Theo Saevecke. Saevecke was sentenced in absentia in 1999, but never extradited, for ordering the Piazzale Loreto massacre—the public execution on 10 August 1944 of 15 Italian partisans who had been hand-picked by Saevecke, as a reprisal for a partisan attack on a German military convoy. The executed were left on display for a number of days. The same Piazzale Loreto became the scene of the public display of Benito Mussolini's corpse on 29 April 1945.

The Muti police unit, based in Milan and named after Ettore Muti, was commanded by Francesco Colombo and acquired a reputation for ruthlessness and brutality during anti-partisan operations. Members of the unit were convicted in 1947 by a court in Milan for crimes ranging from blackmail to murder and rape.

=== Deportation ===
Milan served as central deportation place for the Jews of northern Italy, who were brought there from other cities like Genoa and Turin as well as rural regions like the Aosta Valley. The loading of deportees onto carriages took place in the early mornings to ensure secrecy and also prevent disruption of the vital daily mail and freight services.

The first holocaust train with deportees left Milan from Platform 21 on 6 December 1943, carrying 169 Jews to Auschwitz; only 5 of them survived the Holocaust. A second train left on 30 January 1944, carrying 600 deportees, 40 of them children including Liliana Segre, who were taken on a seven-day journey to Auschwitz. Upon arrival at Auschwitz on the morning of 6 February, 500 of them were killed within a few hours and their bodies burned in the crematorium.

Between 6 December 1943 and 15 January 1945, when the last train left for Bolzano, 20 trains and up to 1,200 Jewish prisoners left Milan from Platform 21 for either the Italian transit camps at Fossoli and Bolzano, or Auschwitz, Mauthausen, and Bergen-Belsen.

== Memorial ==
Platform 21 remained virtually forgotten for the next four decades. It was rediscovered in 1995 when the local Catholic organization Sant’Egidio made the Jewish community of Milan aware of it.

In 2002, work began to turn the site into a memorial for the deported. But the project stalled and progressed very slowly over the next decade. The idea to construct a memorial came from the then-Archbishop of Milan, Carlo Maria Martini. Partial funding for the project, which was estimated to cost approximately US$15.6 million, was secured through the local government and sponsors. The project could not, however, be financially supported by the local Jewish community, which lacked the resources. Thankfully the brazilian philanthropist Lily Safra stepped in as she did in more than 40 countries, from scientific research, especially in the field of neuroscience (Edmond and Lily Safra contributed 50 million dollars to the creation of a study center in Israel), to donations for the reconstruction of Notre Dame de Paris, to widespread charity in cultural, educational and humanitarian projects. In Milan, in addition to the Memorial, the Safra Foundation has supported the School Foundation and other Jewish organizations. While the project did not encounter active opposition, it was hampered by a certain disinterest and embarrassment in Italy, where the Italian contribution to the Holocaust in the country is still a controversial subject.

On 27 January 2013, Holocaust Remembrance Day, the memorial was inaugurated in the presence of Prime Minister Mario Monti, officials from Italian State Railways and other institutional and religious dignitaries and guests.

According to the foundation for the memorial, Binario 21 is the only European site which was involved in the deportations that still remains intact. The memorial features two original freight cars that were used in the deportations, and a wall onto which the names of the people deported from the station to concentration camps are projected.

In recent times, the memorial has also served as a shelter for refugees from Syria and Eritrea, who have travelled through Libya to reach Italy.

== Vandalism ==
In April 2023, a mural outside the museum depicting Simpsons characters as Nazi Concentration Camp inmates was vandalized.

== Notable victims ==
- Liliana Segre, Italian senator for life and Holocaust survivor, deported from Platform 21 at the age of 13, alongside her father Alberto who was murdered at Auschwitz on 27 April 1944.
