= Milano Centrale railway station =

Railway station in Milan, Italy

Milano Centrale
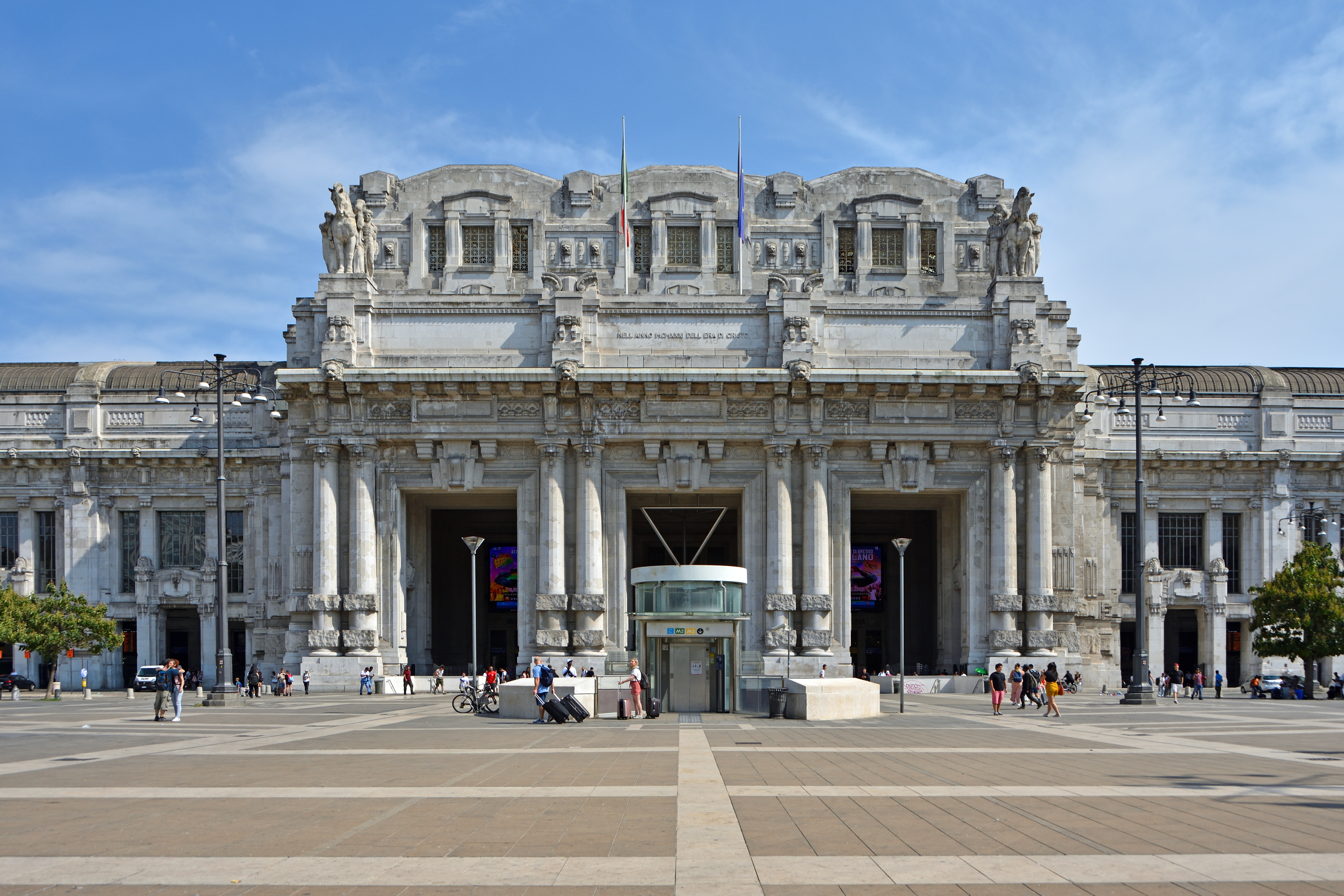
- Main entrance portico on Piazza Duca d'Aosta, 2022

General information
- Location: Piazza Duca d'Aosta; 20124 Milan; Italy
- Coordinates: 45°29′10″N 09°12′13″E
- Owner: Rete Ferroviaria Italiana
- Operator: Grandi Stazioni
- Lines: Milan–Bologna (high-speed); Milan–Bologna (traditional); Milan–Turin (high-speed); Milan–Turin (traditional); Milan–Genoa; Milan–Venice; Milan–Chiasso (–Zürich); Milan–Domodossola (–Brig); Milan–Lecco
- Tracks: 24
- Connections: Milan Metro; ATM trams; ATM buses and trolleybuses; Airport buses

Construction
- Architect: Ulisse Stacchini

Other information
- IATA code: XIK
- Fare zone: STIBM: Mi1

History
- Opened: 1 July 1931; 95 years ago
- Electrified: 1938

Passengers
- 120 million per year
Services
Preceding station	Trenitalia	Following station
Torino Porta Susa towards Paris-Lyon	Frecciarossa	Terminus
Terminus	Frecciarossa	Brescia towards Venezia Santa Lucia or Trieste Centrale
Torino Porta Nuova Terminus	Frecciarossa	Milano Rogoredo towards Reggio di Calabria Centrale
Terminus	Frecciarossa	Piacenza towards Lecce
Terminus	Frecciabianca	Genova Piazza Principe towards Napoli Centrale
Terminus	InterCity; Ventimiglia–Milan	Pavia towards Ventimiglia
Terminus	InterCity; Milan–Livorno	Pavia towards Livorno
Terminus	InterCity; Milan–Naples	Milano Rogoredo towards Napoli Centrale
Terminus	InterCity; Milan–Lecce	Milano Rogoredo towards Lecce
Terminus	InterCity Notte; Milan–Lecce	Milano Rogoredo towards Lecce
Terminus	InterCity Notte; Milan–Syracuse	Piacenza towards Siracusa
Stresa towards Basel SBB	EuroCity	Terminus
Stresa towards Genève-Cornavin	EuroCity	Brescia towards Venezia Santa Lucia
Como San Giovanni towards Zürich HB	EuroCity	Brescia towards Venezia Santa Lucia
Como San Giovanni towards Frankfurt (Main) Hbf	EuroCity	Terminus
Rho Fiera towards Torino Porta Nuova	Regionale Veloce; Turin–Milan	Terminus
Terminus	Regionale Veloce; Genoa–Milan	Milano Lambrate towards Genova Piazza Principe
Terminus	Regionale Veloce; Asti–Milan	Milano Lambrate towards Asti
Preceding station	Trenitalia Tper	Following station
Terminus	Regionale; Milano–Pescara	Milano Lambrate towards Pescara Centrale
Preceding station	Trenord	Following station
Milano Porta Garibaldi towards Malpensa Aeroporto Terminal 2	Malpensa Express	Terminus
Terminus	RE2	Milano Lambrate towards Bergamo
Rho Fiera towards Domodossola	RE4	Terminus
Terminus	RE6	Milano Lambrate towards Verona Porta Nuova
Terminus	RE8	Monza towards Tirano
Terminus	RE11	Milano Lambrate towards Mantova
Terminus	RE13	Milano Lambrate towards Alessandria or Arquata Scrivia
Terminus	R4	Milano Lambrate towards Brescia
Milano Porta Garibaldi towards Malpensa Aeroporto Terminal 2	R28	Terminus
Terminus	limited service	Milano Greco Pirelli One-way operation
Preceding station	TiLo	Following station
Terminus	RE80	Monza towards Locarno
Preceding station		Following station
Rho Fiera towards Torino Porta Nuova	Torino–Reggio Calabria	Reggio Emilia AV Mediopadana towards Reggio di Calabria Centrale
Rho Fiera towards Torino Porta Nuova	Torino–Bari	Reggio Emilia AV Mediopadana towards Bari Centrale
Rho Fiera towards Torino Porta Nuova	Torino–Salerno	Milano Rogoredo towards Salerno
Terminus	Milano–Venezia	Brescia towards Venezia Santa Lucia
Terminus	Milano–Udine	Brescia towards Udine
Location
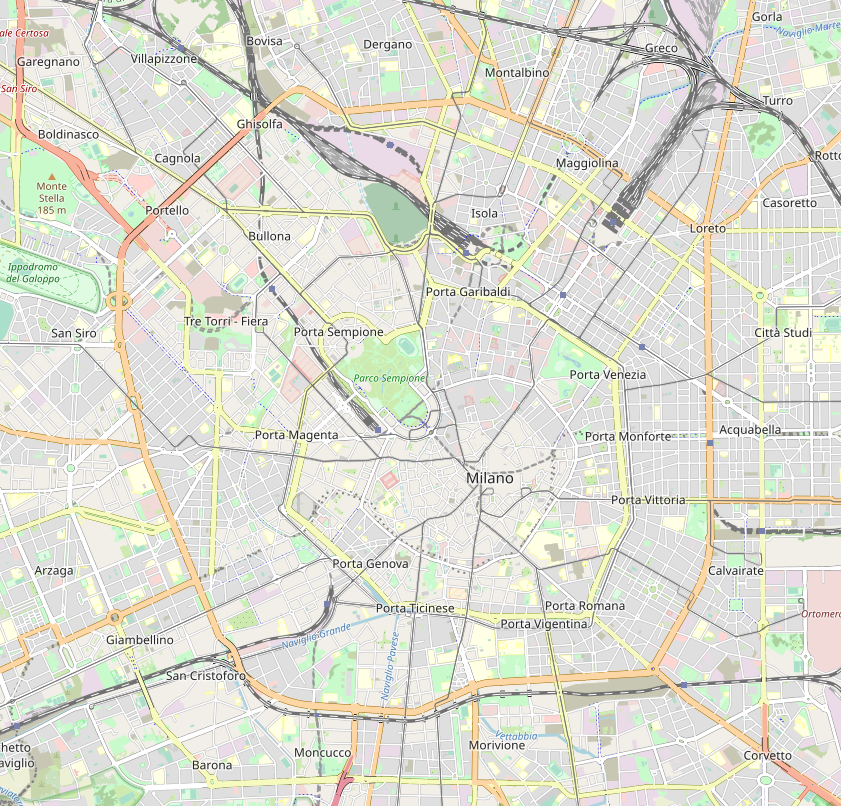
- Location within Milan Location within Lombardy Location within Northern Italy Location within Italy

Milano Centrale (Italian: Stazione di Milano Centrale) is the main railway station of the city of Milan, Northern Italy, and is the second busiest railway station in Italy for passenger flow (after Roma Termini) and the largest railway station in Europe by volume.

The station is a terminus and located at the northern end of central Milan. It was officially inaugurated in 1931 to replace the old central station (built 1864), which was a transit station that could not handle the increased traffic caused by the opening of the Simplon Tunnel in 1906 due to the old station's limited number of tracks and space.

Milano Centrale has high-speed connections to Turin in the west, Venice via Verona in the east and on the north–south mainline to Bologna, Rome, Naples and Salerno. The Simplon and Gotthard railway lines connect Milano Centrale to Basel and Geneva via Domodossola and Zürich via Chiasso in Switzerland.

Destinations of inter-city and regional railways radiate from Milano Centrale to Ventimiglia (border of France), Genova, Turin, Domodossola (border of Swiss Canton of Valais/Wallis), Tirano (border of Swiss Canton of Graubünden/Grisons), Bergamo, Verona, Mantua, Bologna and La Spezia.

The Milan suburban railway service, however, does not use Milano Centrale but the other mainline stations: Porta Garibaldi (northwest), Cadorna (west) and Rogoredo (east).

Architect Aldo Rossi declared in an interview of February 1995 to Cecilia Bolognesi: "They told me that when Frank Lloyd Wright came to Milan, and he came only once, he was really impressed by it and said it was the most beautiful station in the world. For me it is also more beautiful than Grand Central Station in New York. I know few stations like this one".

== History ==
The first Milano Centrale station opened in 1864 in the area now occupied by the Piazza della Repubblica, south of the modern station. It was designed by French architect Louis-Jules Bouchot (1817–1907) and its architectural style was reminiscent of Parisian buildings of that period. The station was designed to replace Porta Tosa station (opened in 1846 as the terminus of the line to Treviglio and eventually Venice) and Porta Nuova station (opened in 1850 as the second terminus on the line to Monza, which was eventually extended to Chiasso) and was interconnected with all lines, either existing or under construction, surrounding Milan. It remained in operation until 30 June 1931, when the current station was opened. There is now no trace of the old station left.

King Victor Emmanuel III of Italy laid the cornerstone of the new station on 28 April 1906, before a blueprint for the station had even been chosen. The last, real, contest for its construction was won in 1912 by architect Ulisse Stacchini, who titled his project "In Motu Vita," meaning "Life in Motion" in Latin. His proposal was given unanimous approval by the commission gathered to judge the competition. The purported style was an eclectic mix called "Assyrian-Lombard."

Due to the Italian economic crisis during World War I, construction proceeded very slowly. Stacchini made multiple revisions to the project, mainly to quell concerns by the Milan city government about high construction costs. Benito Mussolini's ascension to the position of Prime Minister was the catalyst behind the resumption of work in 1925, as multiple public works projects were accelerated in order to bolster the reception of the Fascist government's ability to effectively manage national projects. The major changes were the new platform types and the introduction of the great steel canopies by Alberto Fava; 341 m (1,119 ft) long and covering an area of 66,500 square metres (716,000 sq ft).

Construction resumed in 1925, and on 1 July 1931 the station was officially opened in the presence of Foreign Minister Galeazzo Ciano.

The station played a major role during the Holocaust in Italy, when Jewish inmates from the San Vittore Prison, previously captured in northern Italy, would be taken to a secret track, Binario 21, underneath the station to be deported to extermination camps. Altogether, 15 deportation trains with 1,200 prisoners left the station from Binario 21. A Memoriale della Shoah was opened at the former platform in January 2013 to commemorate these events.

Its façade is 200 metres (660 ft) wide and its vault is 72 metres (236 ft) high, a record when it was built. It has 24 platforms. Each day about 330,000 passengers use the station, totaling about 120 million per year.

The station has no definite architectural style, but is a blend of many different styles, especially Liberty and Art Deco, but not limited to those. It is adorned with numerous sculptures. "The 'incongruous envelope of stone' (Attilio Pracchi) of this gigantic and monumental building dominates Piazza Duca d'Aosta."

On 25 September 2006 officials announced a €100 million project, already in progress, to refurbish the station. Of the total cost, €20 million has been allocated to restore "certain areas of high artistic value" while the remaining €80 million will be used for more general improvements to the station to make it more functional with the current railway services. The project includes moving the ticket office and installing new elevators and escalators for increased accessibility.

There remain unrestored and inaccessible areas to the public within the station, including a waiting room with swastikas on the floor designed to receive Adolf Hitler.

== Gallery ==
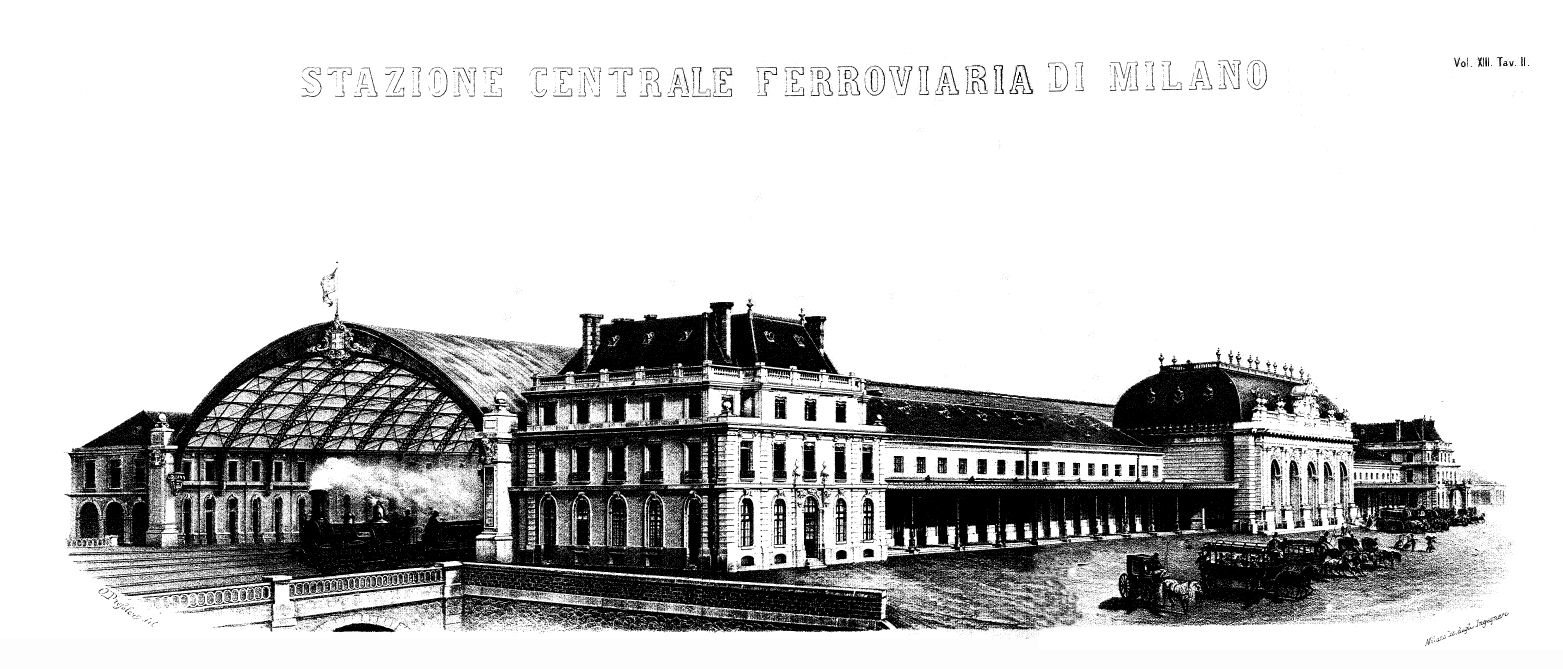
The first Milano Centrale railway station from Giornale dell'Ingegnere e Architetto, January 1865, vol. 13, Annex

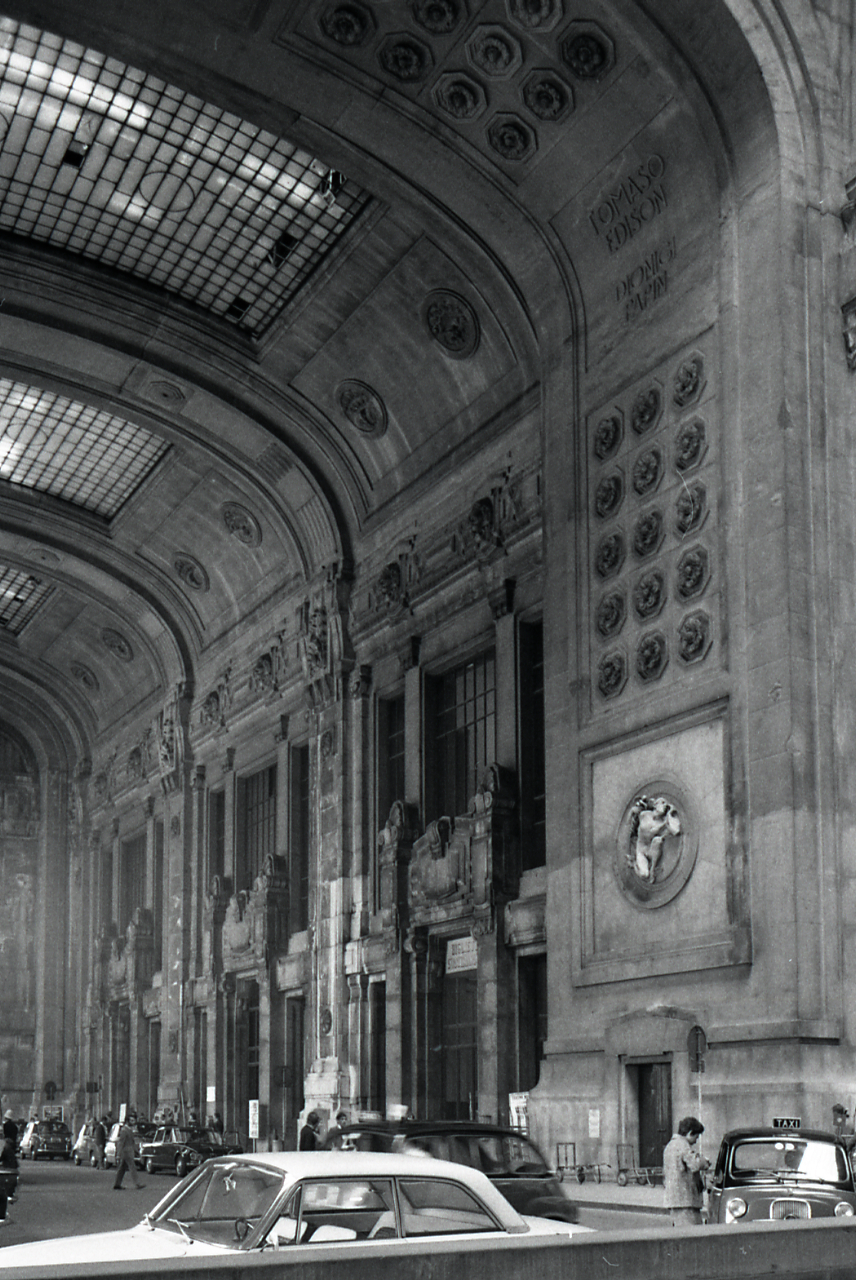
Lateral view of the gallery

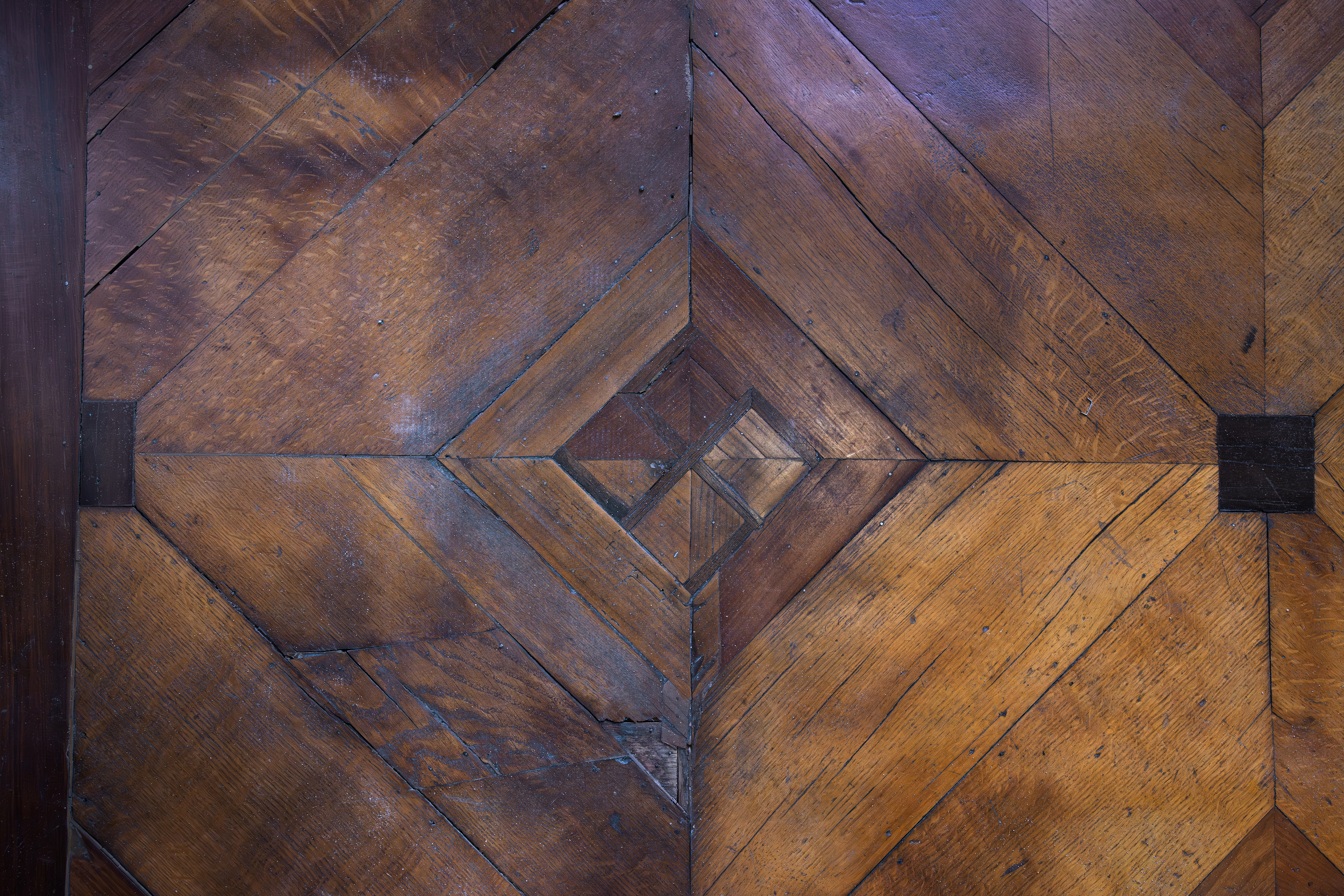
Swastika in the floor of the Royal Hall of the Milan Central Station

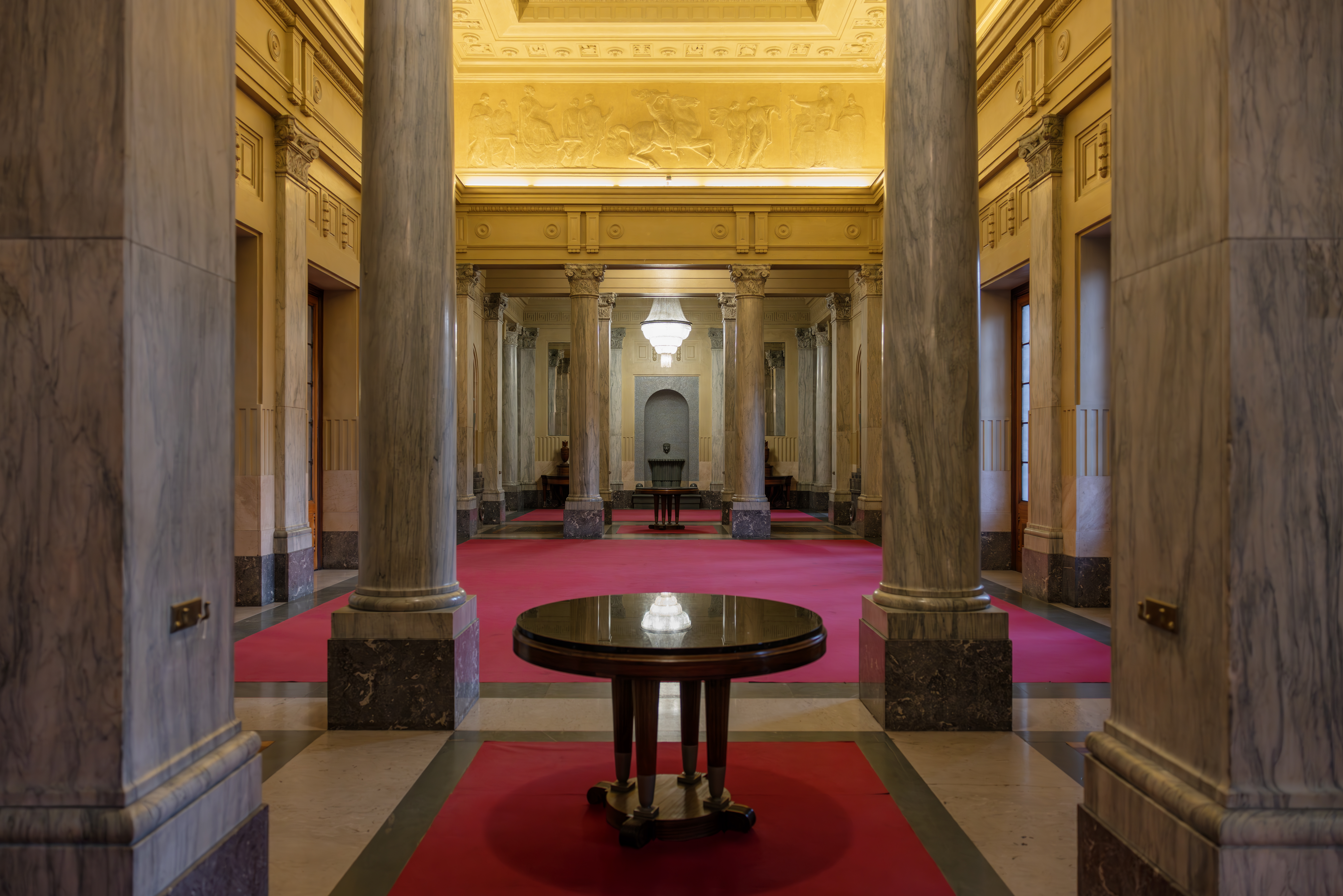
The Royal Hall designed in 1931 by the architect Ulisse Stacchini

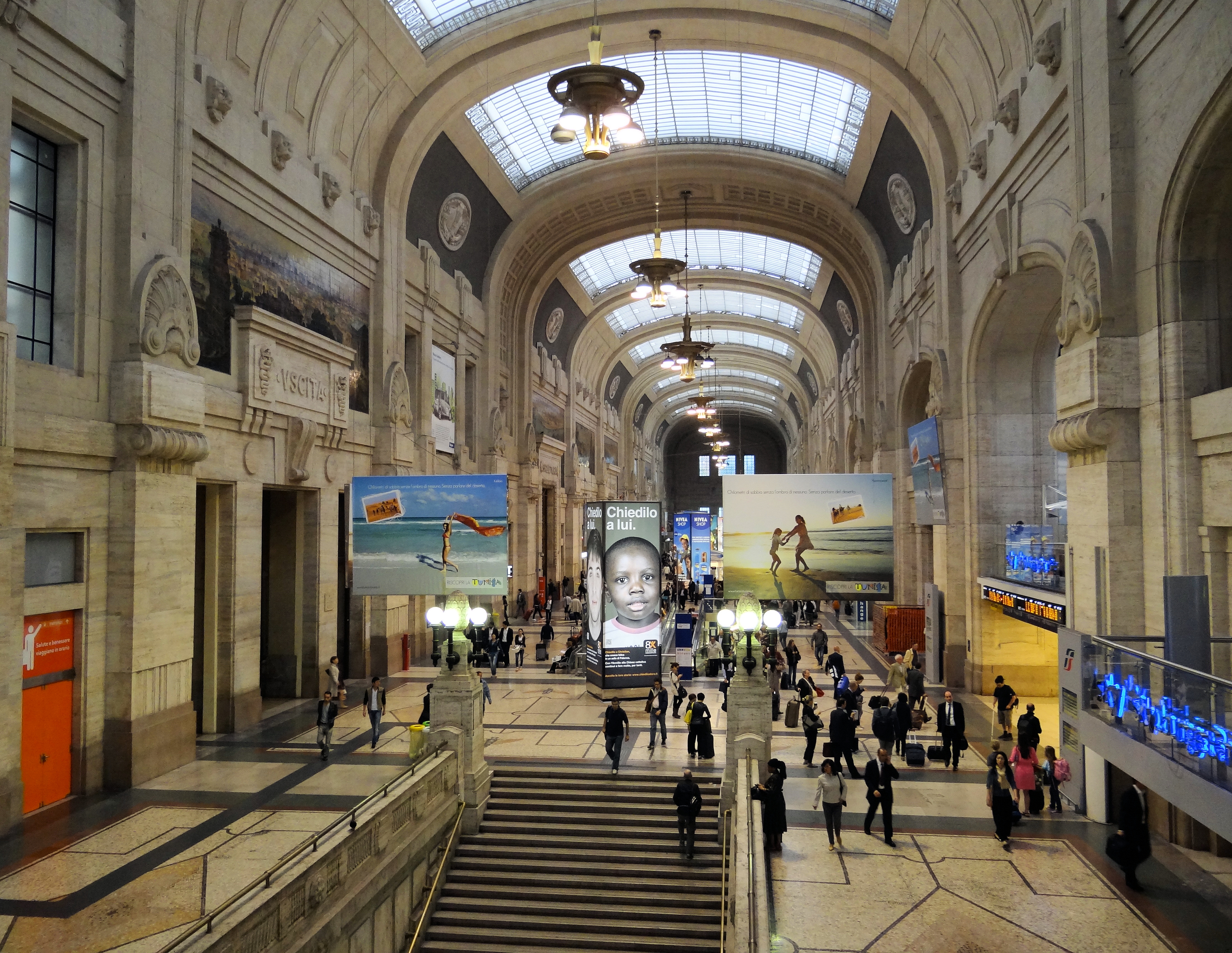
A view of the arrival hall

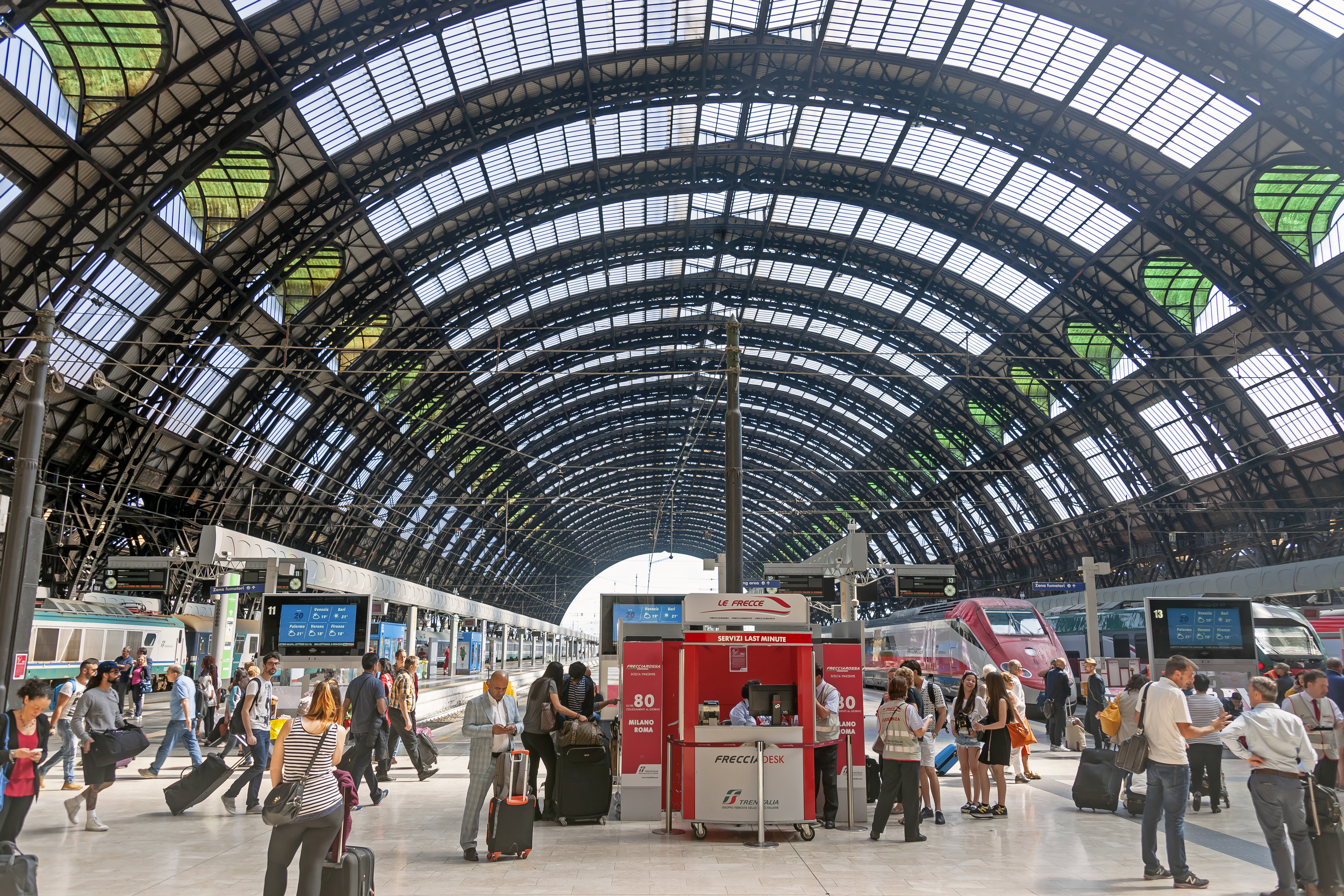
The roof of the central section

== Train services ==
The station has 24 tracks. Every day about 320,000 passengers pass through the station using about 500 trains, for an annual total of 120 million passengers. The station is served by national and international routes, with both long-distance and regional lines. Daily international destinations include Basel, Lugano, Geneva, Zürich, Paris and Lyon. The station is also connected to Milan-Malpensa Airport through the Malpensa Express airport train.

The following services call at the station (incomplete):

=== Domestic (High-speed) ===
- High-speed train (Trenitalia Frecciarossa) – Turin–Salerno

Turin Porta Nuova – Turin Porta Susa – Milano Centrale – Milan Rogoredo – Bologna Centrale – Florence S.M. Novella – Rome Tiburtina – Rome Termini – Naples Centrale – Salerno

- High-speed train (Trenitalia Frecciarossa) – Milan–Bari

Milan – Bologna – Ancona – Pescara – Foggia – Bari

- High-speed train (Trenitalia Frecciarossa) – Milan–Venice

Milan – Brescia – Peschiera del Garda – Verona – Vicenza – Padua – Venice

- High-speed train (Italo NTV) – Turin–Salerno

Turin – Milan – Bologna – Florence – Rome – Naples – Salerno

- High-speed train (Trenitalia Frecciabianca) – Turin–Venice

Turin – Novara – Milan – Brescia – Verona – Vicenza – Padua – Venice – (Trieste)

- High-speed train (Trenitalia Frecciabianca) – Milan–Lecce

Milan – Piacenza – Parma – Reggio Emilia – Modena – Bologna – Rimini – Pesaro – Ancona – San Benedetto del Tronto – Pescara – Termoli – Foggia – Bari – Brindisi – Lecce

- High-speed train (Trenitalia Frecciabianca) – Milan–Bari/Taranto

Milan – Modena – Bologna – Rimini – Ancona – Pescara – Foggia – Bari – Taranto

=== Domestic ===
For regional (Regio) trains to Monza and Como from Milano Centrale, refer to the cross-border services. There is no train of the Milan suburban railway service at Milano Centrale station, except for two late-night S8 trains bound for Lecco, which serve the last passengers arriving with long-distance trains.

- Airport train (Trenord Malpensa Express) – Milan–Malpensa Airport

Milan – (Busto Arsizio) – Malpensa Airport

- Intercity train (Trenitalia Intercity) – Milan–Lecce

Milan – Piacenza – Parma – Modena – Bologna – Rimini – Ancona – Pescara – Foggia – Trani – Bari – Fasano – Brindisi – Lecce

- Intercity train (Trenitalia Intercity) – Milan–Taranto

Milan – Lodi – Piacenza – Parma – Reggio Emilia – Modena – Bologna – Faenza – Cesena – Rimini – Riccione – Pesaro – Senigallia – Ancona – Giulianova – Pescara – Termoli – Foggia – Trani – Bisceglie – Bari – Taranto

- Intercity train (Trenitalia Intercity) – Milan–Livorno

Milan – Pavia – Tortona – Genova Piazza Principe – Genova Brignole – Santa Margherita Ligure-Portofino – Rapallo – Chiavari – Sestri Levante – Levanto – Monterosso – La Spezia Centrale – Massa Centro – Viareggio – Pisa Centrale – Livorno Centrale

- Intercity train (Trenitalia Intercity) – Milan–Ventimiglia

Milan – Pavia – Genova – San Remo – Ventimiglia

- Night train (Trenitalia Intercity Notte) – Milan–Lecce

Milan – Piacenza – Parma – Reggio Emilia – Modena – Bologna – Cesena – Rimini – Ancona – Pescara – Foggia – Bari – Trani – Brindisi – Lecce

- Regional train (Trenitalia Regionale Veloce): Turin–Milan: Turin – Vercelli – Novara – Milan
- Regional train (Trenitalia Regionale Veloce): Bologna - Milan: Bologna - Parma - Piacenza - Lodi - Milan

- Regional express train (Trenord RegioExpress) – Milan–Alessandria/Novi Ligure

Milan – Pavia – Voghera – Tortona – Alessandria/Novi Ligure

- Regional express train (Trenord RegioExpress) – Milan–Verona

Milan – Brescia – Peschiera del Garda – Verona

- Regional express train (Trenord Regio) – Milan–Tirano

Milan – Lecco – Sondrio – Tirano

- Regional express train (Trenord RegioExpress) – Milan–Mantua

Milan – Lodi – Codogno – Cremona – Piadena – Mantua (limited to Bozzolo as of Decembre 2025, due to track doubling works)

- Regional express train (Trenord RegioExpress) – Milan–Bergamo

Milan – Pioltello-Limito – Bergamo

- Historic train (Fondazione FS / Trenitalia Storico) : several routes, to Paratico-Sarnico, Verona, Laveno-Mombello, Mortara, Cremona etc...

=== Cross-border (Night train) ===
(CH for Switzerland, D for Germany, A for Austria, MN for Monaco)

The following night train was rerouted in 2020 to include stops at Milano Lambrate railway station and Milano Porta Garibaldi railway station:

- Night train (ÖBB Nightjet, operated by Trenitalia) – Milan–Munich/Vienna

Milan – Brescia – Peschiera del Garda – Verona^{†} – (Rovereto/Rofreit) – (Trento/Trient) – Bolzano/Bozen – (Brennero/Brenner) – Innsbruck (A) – Jenbach (A) – Kufstein (A) – Munich (D)

^{†} At Verona, this train connects with the ÖBB Nightjet / EuroNight Rome–Vienna service. The combined formation is split as follows:

- One half couples with the ÖBB Rome–Vienna and continues toward Vienna or Rome.
- The other half proceeds to Munich or Milan.

The Vienna–Rome direction operates similarly, with one half continuing toward Rome or Vienna, while the other couples with the service to Milan or Munich.

=== Cross-border ===
After the opening of the Gotthard Base Tunnel in December 2016, train services between Milan and Switzerland increased in frequency. All SBB-CFF-FSS EuroCity trains (operated by Trenitalia within Italy) now save approximately 35 minutes in total journey time between Bellinzona and Arth-Goldau.

Since December 2017, a new cross-border service, the Milan–Frankfurt EuroCity (operated jointly by Trenitalia, Deutsche Bahn and SBB-CFF-FSS) via Zürich has been operational.

On 18 December 2021, a new Paris–Milan high-speed service was introduced, operated by Frecciarossa.

Current major international train connections include:

- Regional express train (Trenord / TiLo Regio) – Milan–Locarno

Milan – Como San Giovanni – Chiasso (CH) – Lugano (CH) – Locarno (CH)

- EuroCity (Trenitalia / SBB-CFF-FSS) – Geneva–Milan/Venice

Geneva (CH) – Lausanne (CH) – Brig (CH) – Domodossola – Milan – (Brescia) – (Verona) – (Padua) – (Venice)

- EuroCity (Trenitalia / SBB-CFF-FSS) – Basel–Milan

Basel SBB (CH) – Bern (CH) – Thun (CH) – Brig (CH) – Domodossola – Stresa – Busto Arsizio – Milan

- EuroCity (Trenitalia / SBB-CFF-FSS) – Zürich–Milan

Zürich (CH) – Zug (CH) – Arth-Goldau (CH) – Bellinzona (CH) – Lugano (CH) – Chiasso (CH) – Como San Giovanni – Monza – Milan

- EuroCity (Trenitalia / SBB-CFF-FSS) – Lucerne–Milan

Lucerne (CH) – Arth-Goldau (CH) – Bellinzona (CH) – Lugano (CH) – Chiasso (CH) – Como San Giovanni – Monza – Milan

The station is the terminus of the Milan–Paris Frecciarossa, which was inaugurated on 18 December 2021.

=== Platforms ===
The station, along with Roma Termini and Firenze Santa Maria Novella, has security gates, normally free flowing, though supervised by agents.

Each platform is usually dedicated to a specific route. The current organization is as follows (subject to temporary changes):

- Platforms 1–3: Chiasso / Domodossola / Milan–Turin (AV FR), Milan–Malpensa airport train
- Platforms 4–6: Turin / Milan–Como–Arth Goldau–Basel / Zürich
- Platforms 7–13: Venice / Udine
- Platforms 14–17: Bologna–Florence–Rome–Naples
- Platforms 18–23: Genoa–Livorno / Ventimiglia / Parma / Cremona–Mantua / Milan–Treviglio–Bergamo
- Platform 24: Operations

=== Unusual track layout ===
On the northern side of the railway yard, there used to be a loop curve so that trains could turn around and reverse back into the station. The trains could so be displaced from the left side of the station to the right side and vice versa without crossing all the tracks. The tracks on the loop curve are now partially broken up.

== Images ==
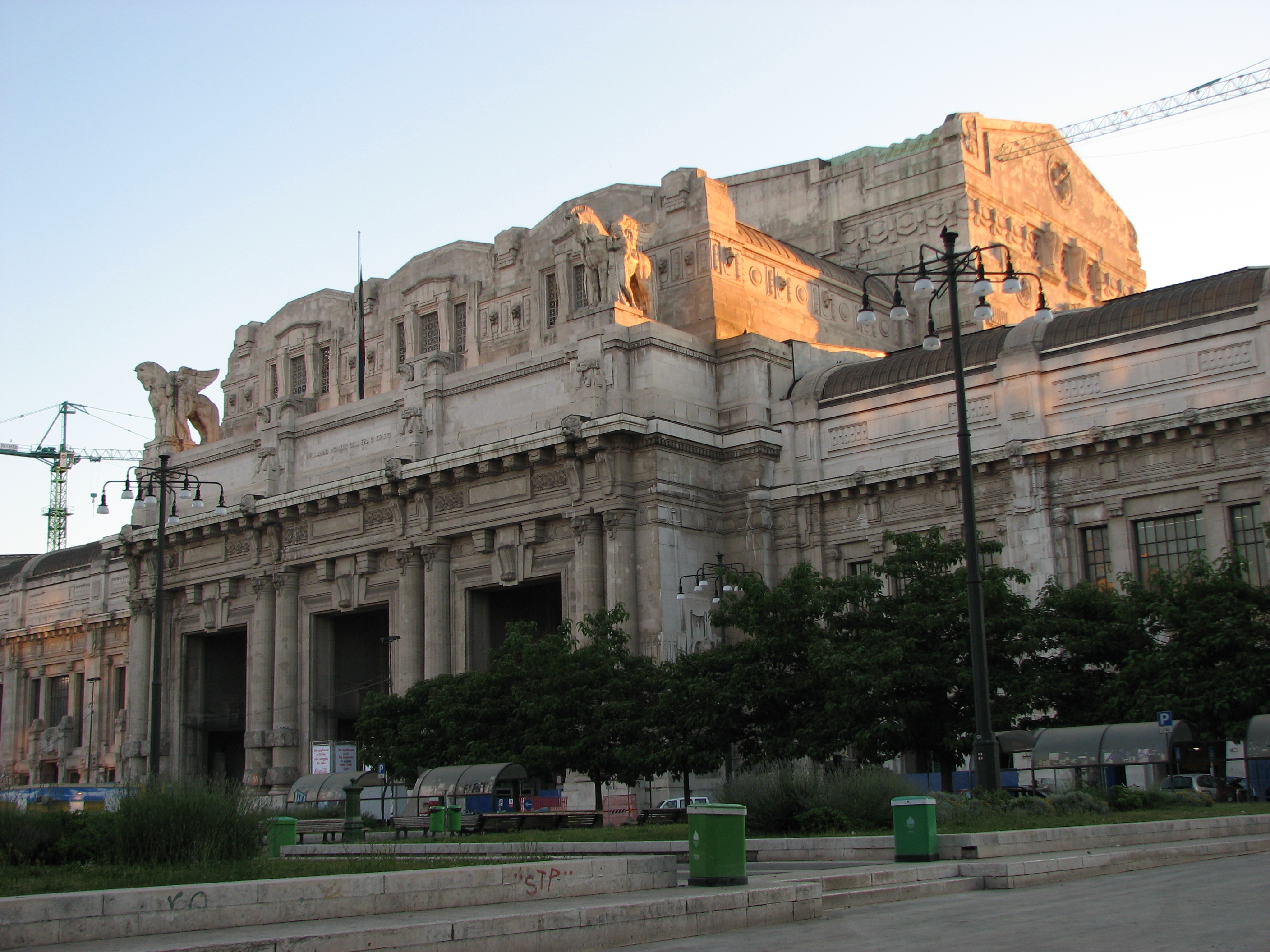

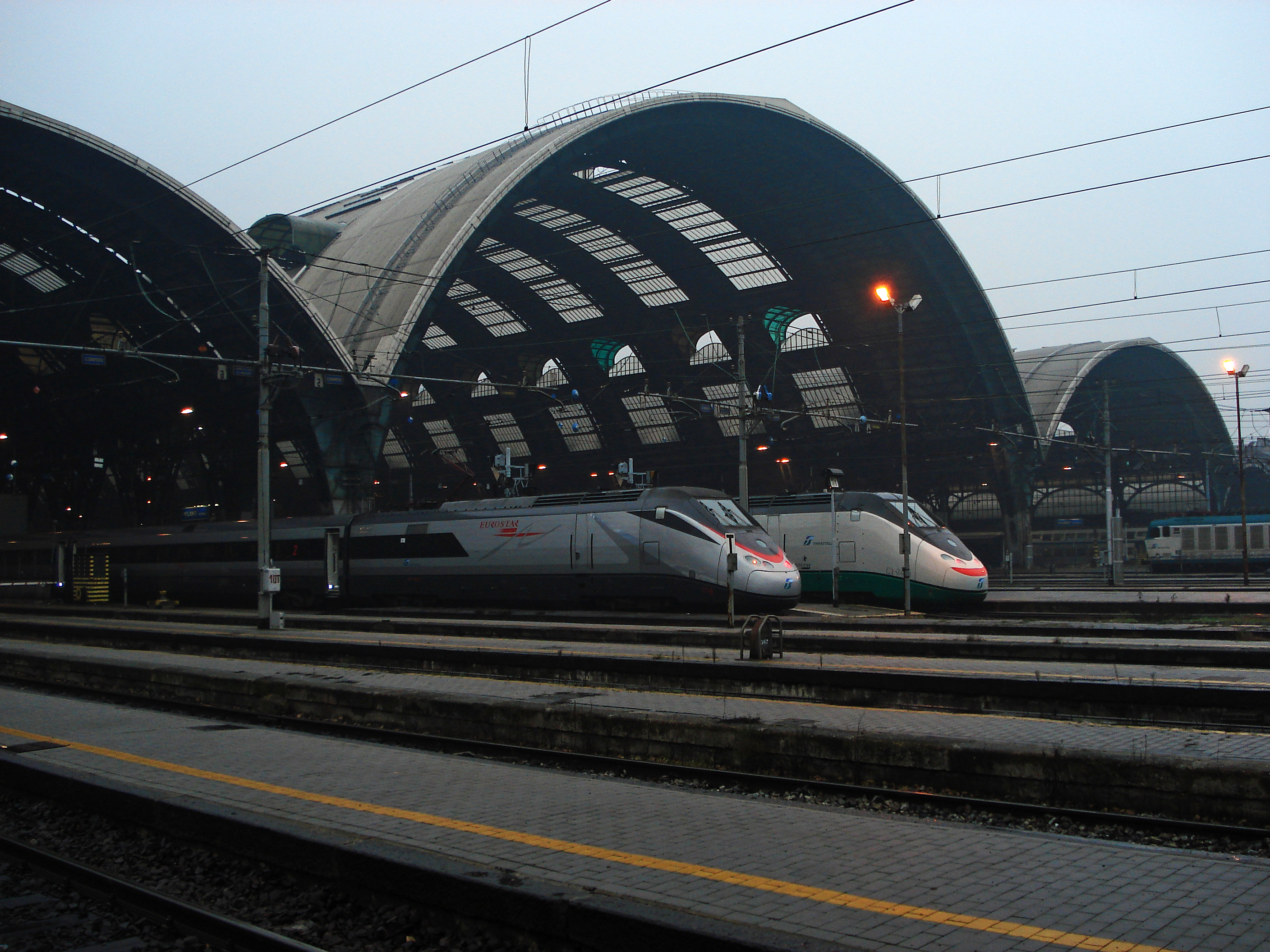

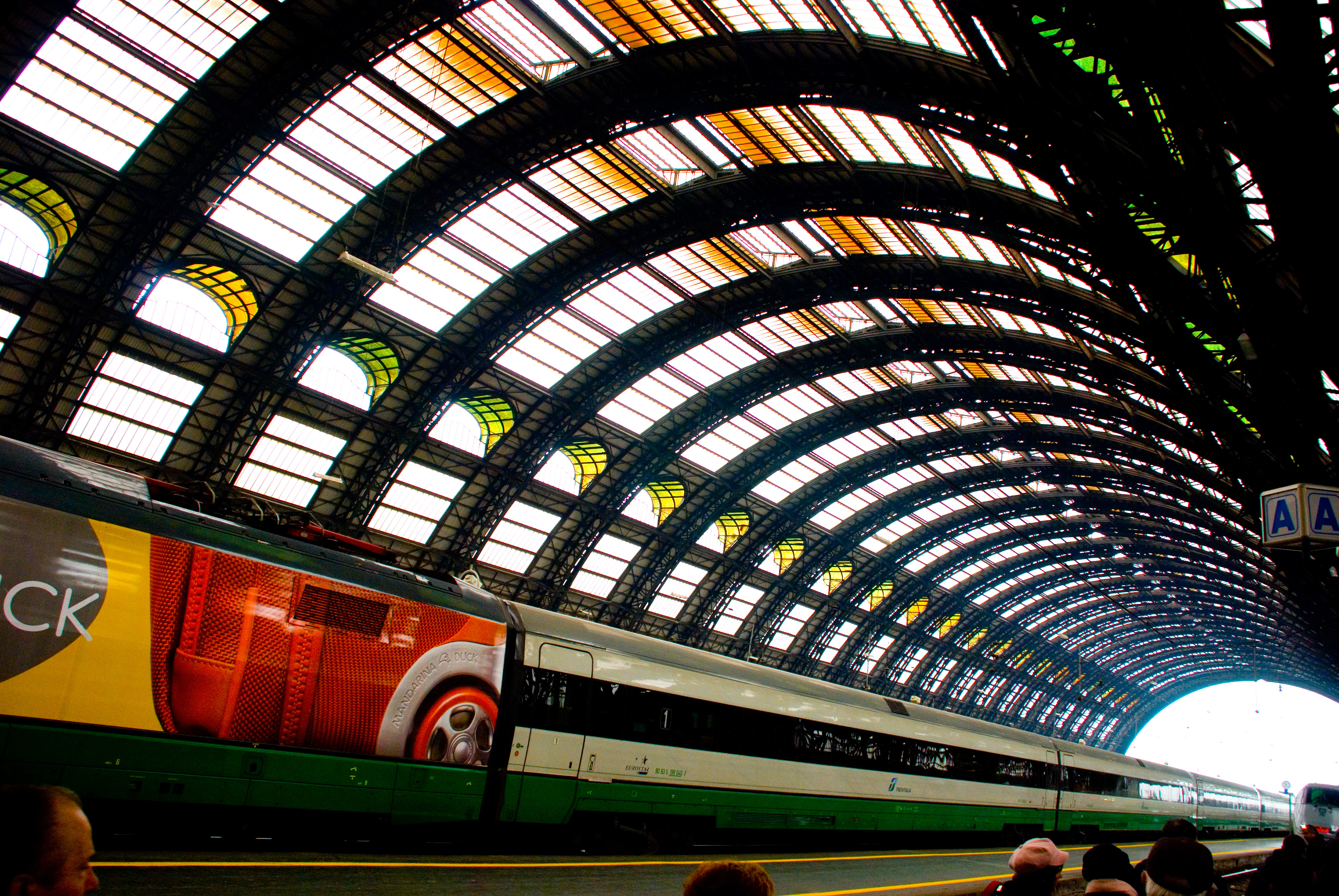

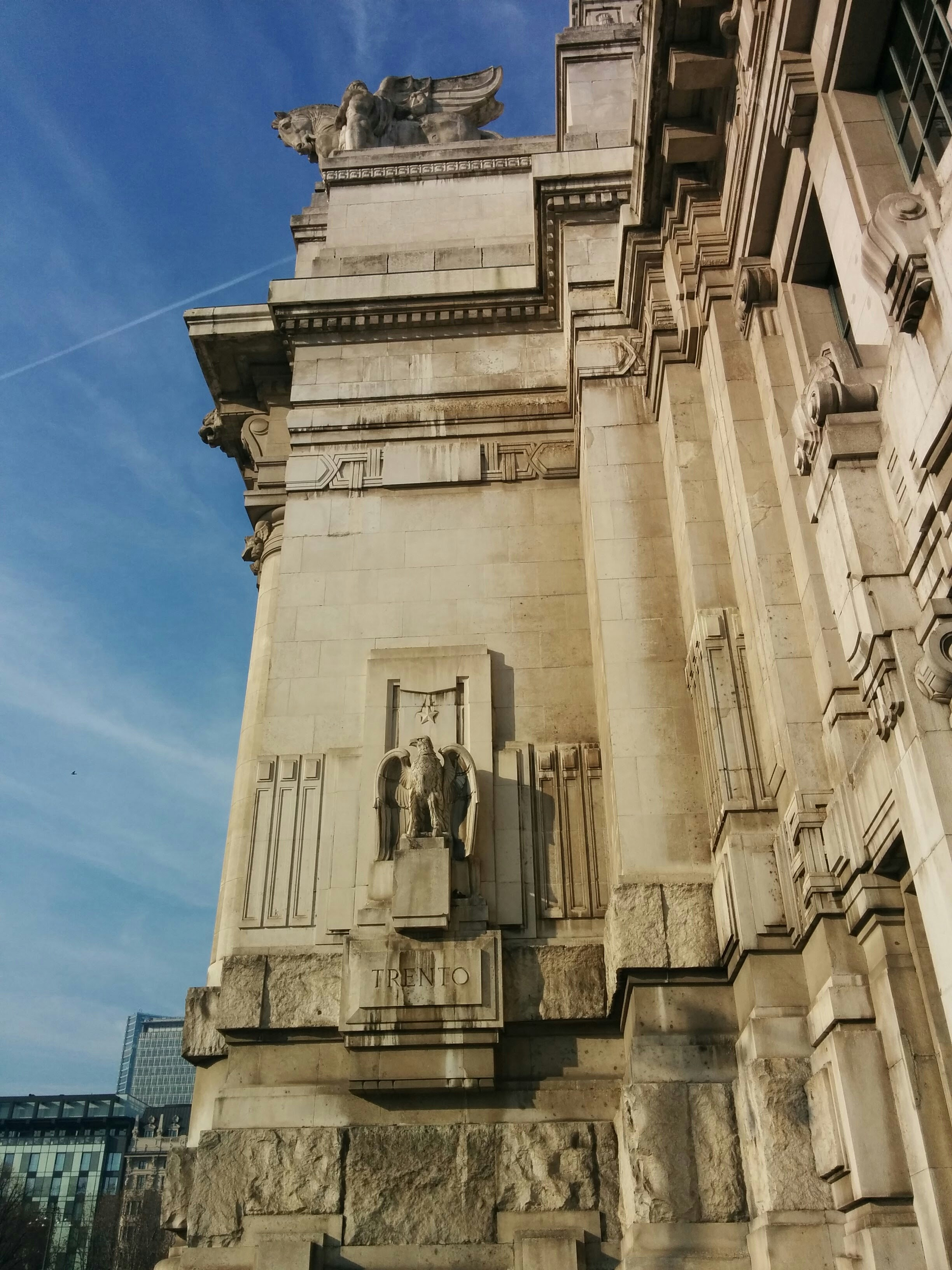

== See also ==
- History of rail transport in Italy
- La mela reintegrata, installed outside the station
- List of railway stations in Lombardy
- Rail transport in Italy
- Railway stations in Milan
- Railway stations in Italy
