= Reggio Emilia AV Mediopadana railway station =

Railway station in Italy

Reggio Emilia AV Mediopadana
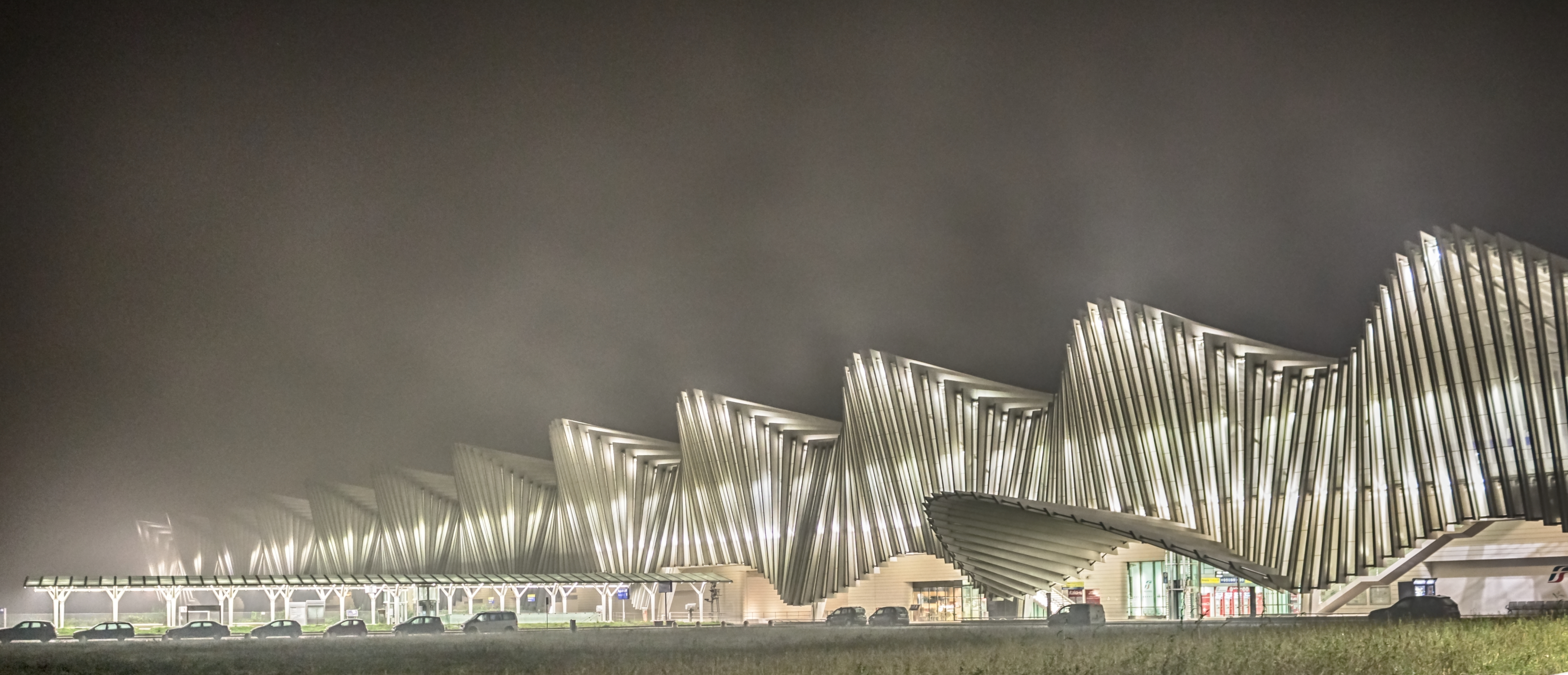
- Reggio Emilia AV Mediopadana railway station at night

General information
- Location: Reggio Emilia, Reggio Emilia, Emilia-Romagna; Italy
- Coordinates: 44°43′31″N 10°39′20″E
- Owner: Rete Ferroviaria Italiana
- Lines: Milan–Bologna high-speed railway Reggio Emilia-Guastalla railway
- Platforms: 2 side platforms
- Train operators: Trenitalia; Nuovo Trasporto Viaggiatori; Ferrovie Emilia Romagna

Construction
- Architect: Santiago Calatrava

History
- Opened: 8 June 2013
Location
- Location within Emilia-Romagna Location within Northern Italy Location within Italy

Reggio Emilia AV Mediopadana is a high-speed railway station in Reggio Emilia, Italy. The station is located on the Milan–Bologna high-speed railway and Reggio Emilia-Guastalla railway. The train services are operated by Trenitalia, Nuovo Trasporto Viaggiatori and Ferrovie Emilia Romagna.

Since 15 December 2013 the station has been connected to the regional line Reggio Emilia-Guastalla railway, offering a connection to the centre of Reggio Emilia.

== Train services ==
The station is served by the following service(s):

- High speed services (Frecciarossa) Turin - Milan - Bologna - Florence - Rome - Naples - Salerno
- High speed services (Frecciarossa) Milan - Bologna - Ancona - Pescara - Foggia – Bari
- High speed services (Italo) Turin - Milan - Bologna - Florence - Rome - Naples - Salerno
- High speed services (Italo) Turin - Milan - Bologna - Ancona
- Local services (Treno regionale) Reggio Emilia - Bagnolo in Piano - Guastalla

== Bus services ==
- 5M Reggio Emilia - Reggio Emilia AV Mediopadana
