= Santi Faustino e Giovita, Chiari =

Church in Lombardy, Italy

Coordinates: 45°32′11″N 9°55′46″E

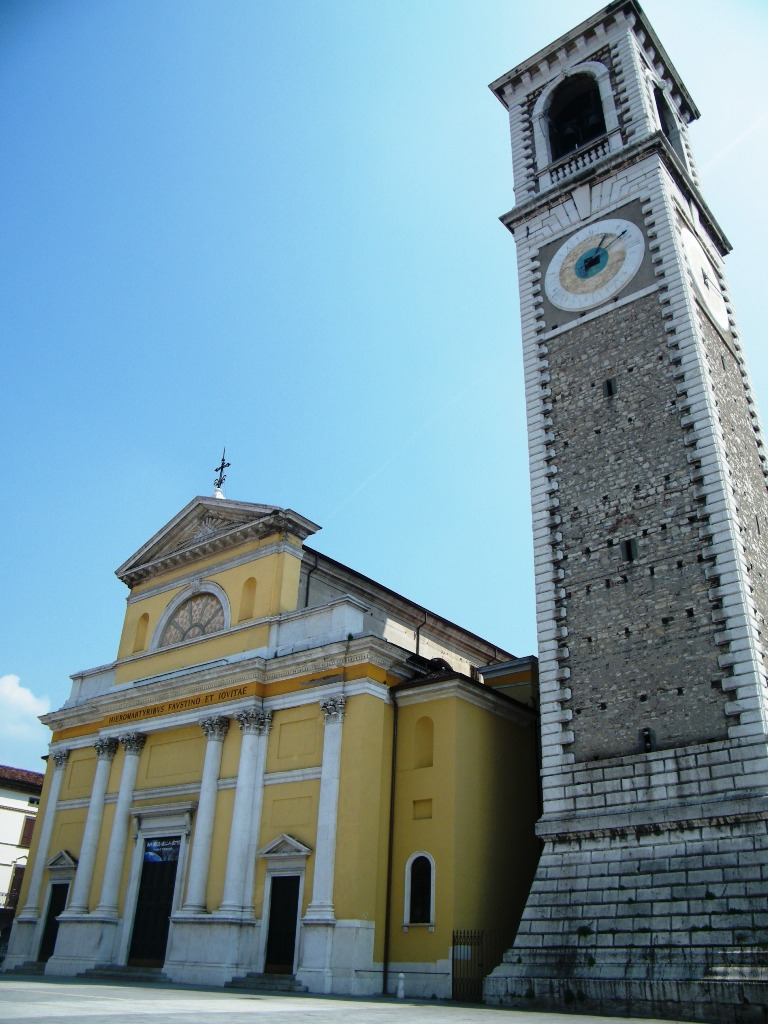
Facade of church.

Santi Faustino e Giovita is the main Roman Catholic church or Duomo, and serves as cathedral for the town of Chiari, region of Lombardy, Italy. It is located on Piazza Zanardelli.

Initially built in the 16th century, it underwent a number of reconstructions. The church contains sculptures by Antonio Calegari, and paintings by Pietro Ricchi, and a "Pietà dei celesti" by Pompeo Batoni.The crypt putatively has the relics of Saint Agape.
