= Santi Faustino e Giovita, Montefiorino =

Church in Emilia-Romagna, Italy

Coordinates: 44.4271°N 10.8229°E

Santi Faustino e Giovita is Roman Catholic parish church located in the town of Montefiorino in the region of Emilia-Romagna, Italy.

== History ==
Documents recall a church of this name from 1304, but the building dates from the 15th century with a refurbishment in the 17th century. The main portal dates from 1639. The church contains a 17th-century canvas with the titular saints, showing the contemporary town and castle in the background. On the counter-facade is a Madonna del Rosario from the 1500s by Ascanio Magnanini.
