= Turin–Milan high-speed railway =

Railway line in Italy

Overview
- Status: Operational
- Owner: RFI
- Locale: Italy
- Termini: Torino Porta Susa; Milano Centrale

Service
- Type: High-speed
- Operator(s): Trenitalia

History
- Opened: 10 February 2006

Technical
- Line length: 148.3 km (92.1 mi)
- Track gauge: 1,435 mm (4 ft 8 1/2 in)
- Electrification: 25 kV AC

The Turin–Milan high-speed railway line is a link in the Italian high-speed rail network. It is part of Corridor 5 of the European Union's Trans-European high-speed rail network, which connects Lisbon and Kyiv. The section between Turin and Novara opened on 10 February 2006, while the remainder opened on 5 December 2009.

The route is 125 kilometres (78 mi) long (98 kilometres (61 mi) in Piedmont and 27 kilometres (17 mi) in Lombardy) and crosses the territory of 41 municipalities. The estimated cost of the works is €2,580 million (€20.6 million per kilometre, €33.2 million per mile). The flatness of the countryside has allowed 80% (approximately 100 km (62 mi)) of the track to be built at ground level, with a small amount of line built in cuttings, approximately 15% (about 20 kilometres (12 mi)) on viaducts, and about 5% (nearly 5 kilometres (3.1 mi)) in cut-and-cover tunnel. Among the most important structures is the 3.8-kilometre-long (2.4 mi) Santhià Viaduct and the 600-metre-long (0.37 mi) Pregnana Milanese Tunnel. Most of the line closely follows the south side of the Milan-Turin Autostrada.

The 85-kilometre (53 mi) section between Turin and Novara was inaugurated on 10 February for the 2006 Olympics in Turin. The 40-kilometre (25 mi) section between Novara and Milan was officially opened on 5 December 2009.

== See also ==
- List of railway lines in Italy
