= Chiari, Lombardy =

Chiari Ciare
- Comune
- Comune di Chiari
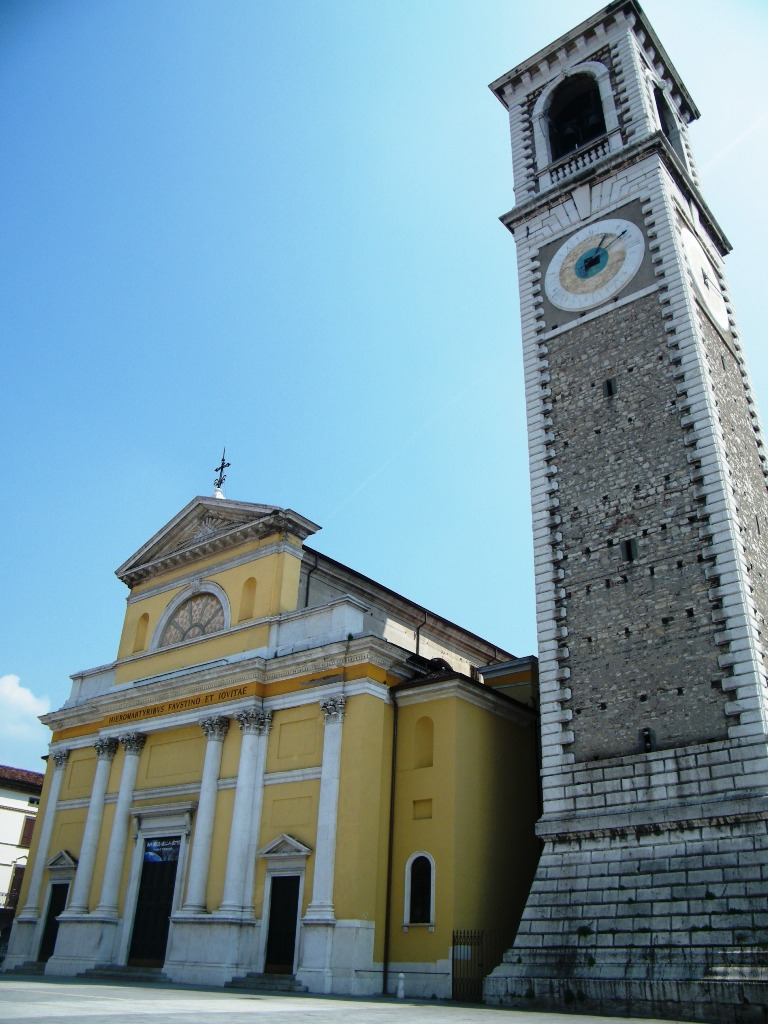
- Chiari Cathedral.

- Coat of arms

- Location within Italy Location within Lombardy
- Coordinates: 45°32′11″N 9°55′45″E
- Country: Italy
- Region: Lombardy
- Province: Brescia (BS)
- Frazioni: San Bernardo, San Giovanni, Santellone

Government
  - Mayor: Gabriele Zotti

Area
  - Total: 38 km^{2} (15 sq mi)
- Elevation: 145 m (476 ft)

Population (2025)
  - Total: 19,642
  - Density: 520/km^{2} (1,300/sq mi)
- Demonym: Clarensi
- Time zone: UTC+1 (CET)
  - Summer (DST): UTC+2 (CEST)
- Postal code: 25032
- Dialing code: 030
- Patron saint: Sts. Faustino and Giovita
- Saint day: February 15
- Website: Official website

Chiari (Lombard: Ciare) is a comune in the province of Brescia, in Lombardy, Italy. The 1701 Battle of Chiari was fought here during the War of the Spanish Succession. The town is the birthplace of Isidoro Chiari and Stefano Antonio Morcelli. The main church or duomo is the church of Santi Faustino e Giovita.

== Twin towns ==
Chiari is twinned with:

- Valmadrera, Italy, since 2009
- Algemesí, Spain, since 2014

== Notable people ==
- Lento Goffi (1923-2008) poet, literary critic and journalist, born in Chiari.

== Transport ==
- Chiari railway station
