= Ulisse Stacchini =

Italian architect

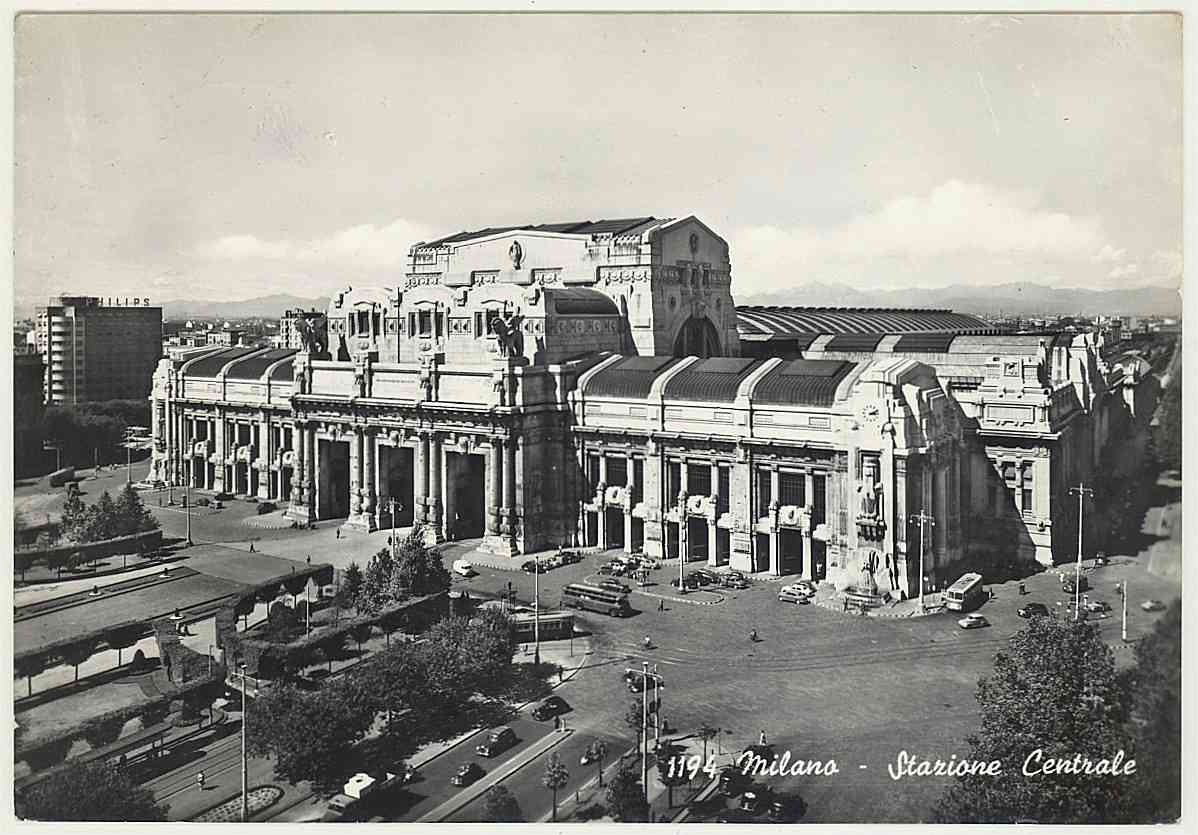
Milano Centrale

Ulisse Stacchini (July 3, 1871 – 1947) was an Italian architect. He was born in Florence and studied in Milan and died in Sanremo.

His major works include the Milan Central Station and Stadio Giuseppe Meazza.

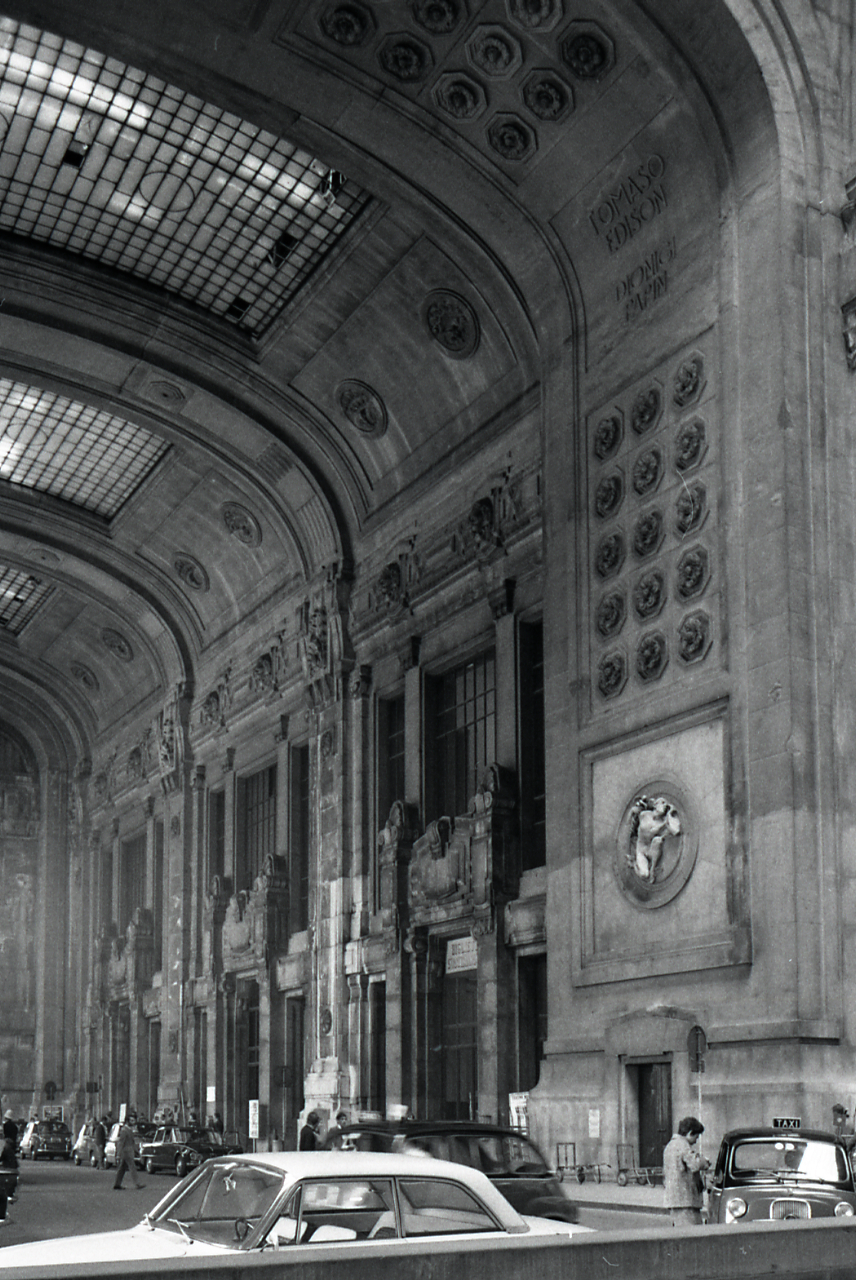
Milan Central Station. Photo by Paolo Monti, 1969
