= Firenze Rifredi railway station =

Railway station in Italy

Firenze Rifredi
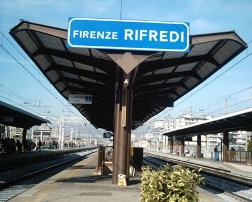
- View of one of the platforms.

General information
- Location: Via dello Steccuto; 50141 Firenze FI; Florence, Florence, Tuscany; Italy
- Coordinates: 43°48′01″N 11°14′12″E
- Operator: Rete Ferroviaria Italiana
- Lines: Bologna–Florence (traditional); Viareggio–Florence; Florence–Pisa–Livorno
- Distance: 2.767 km (1.719 mi) from Firenze Santa Maria Novella
- Train operators: Trenitalia
- Connections: Urban buses

Other information
- Classification: Gold
Location
- Location within Tuscany Location within Italy

Firenze Rifredi railway station, or Florence Rifredi railway station (Italian: Stazione di Firenze Rifredi), serves the city and comune of Florence, in the region of Tuscany, central Italy. It is the third most important railway station in Florence, after Firenze Santa Maria Novella and Firenze Campo di Marte. It also forms part of the traditional Bologna–Florence railway, and the railways linking Florence with Viareggio, and Pisa and Livorno, respectively.

The station is currently managed by Rete Ferroviaria Italiana (RFI). Train services to and from the station are operated by Trenitalia. Each of these companies is a subsidiary of Ferrovie dello Stato (FS), Italy's state-owned rail company.

== Location ==
Firenze Rifredi railway station is situated in Via dello Steccuto, in the district of Rifredi in the north of the city.

== Features ==
The station features nine through tracks used for passenger trains. These are served by five platforms partly covered by canopies. The platforms are connected with each other by a pedestrian underpass.

== Passenger and train movements ==
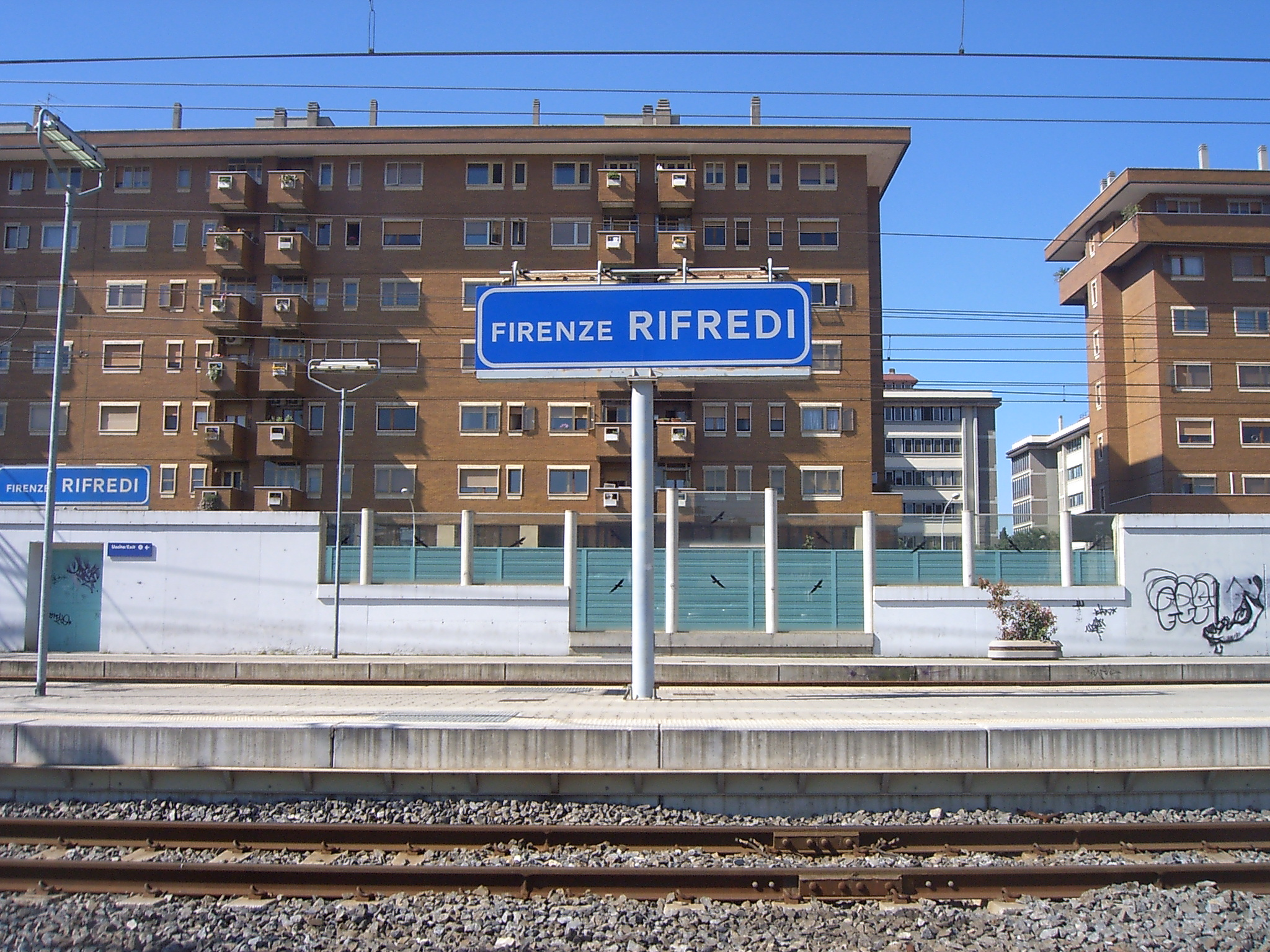
Another platform view.

The station is served by regional trains direct to Prato, Bologna, Pisa, Livorno, Pistoia, Lucca, Viareggio, Carrara, La Spezia, Siena, Campiglia Marittima and Grosseto.

For many InterCity trains, both northbound and southbound, Firenze Rifredi is the only station in the city of Florence at which the train stops, to avoid reversing at SMN.

While from 1989, when service of high speed pendolino train began, the stop for that trains were in Rifredi station, gradually more of such trains were moved to Firenze Santa Maria Novella, or Firenze Campo Marte, until 2005 when no more HS train stopped regularly at this station.

== Interchange ==
The station has a bus terminal for urban buses.

== See also ==
- History of rail transport in Italy
- List of railway stations in Tuscany
- Rail transport in Italy
- Railway stations in Italy
