= Pistoia railway station =

Railway station in Pistoia, Italy

Pistoia
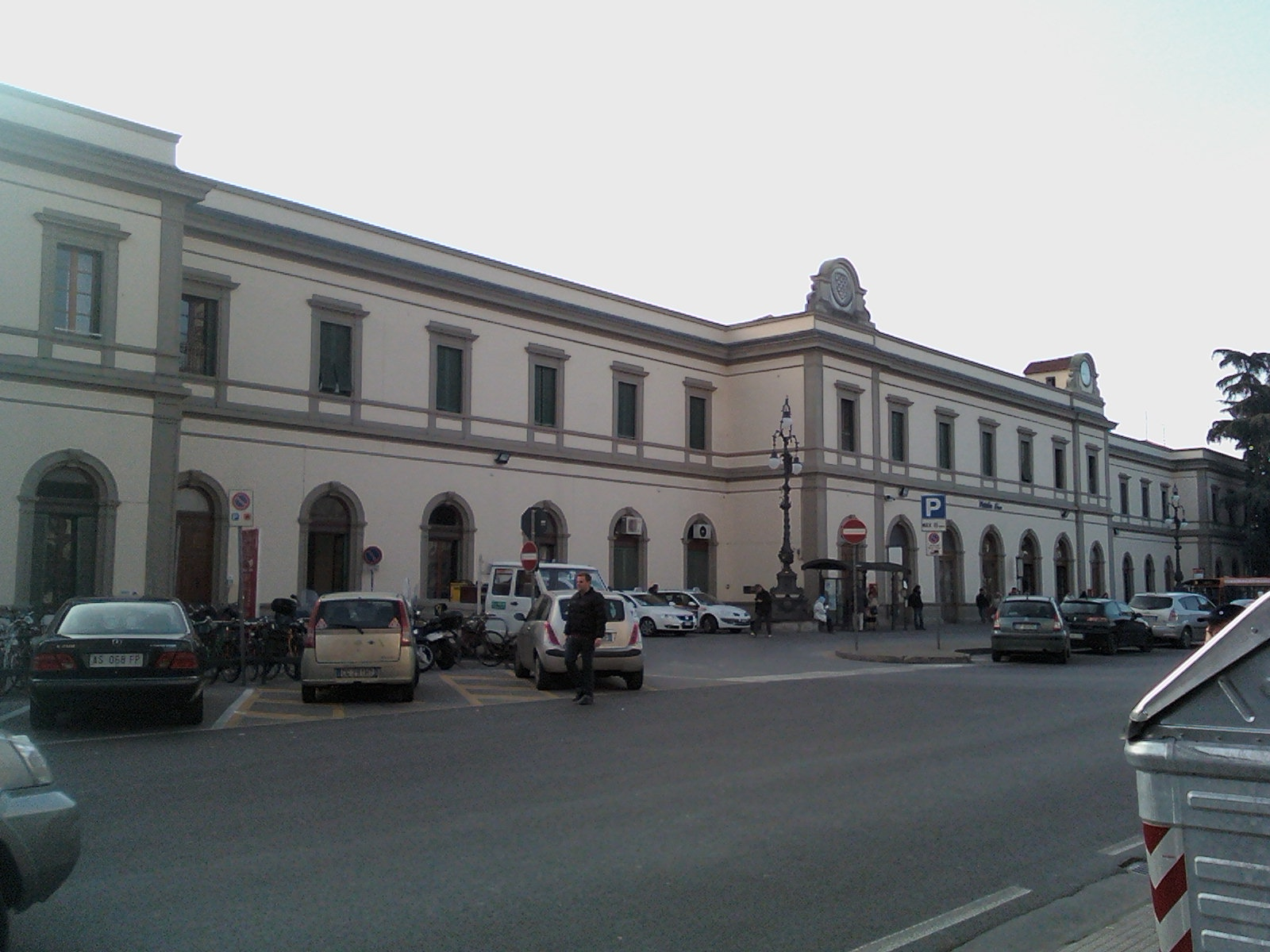
- Pistoia station

General information
- Location: Piazza Dante Alighieri; 51100 Pistoia PT; Pistoia, Pistoia, Tuscany; Italy
- Coordinates: 43°55′37″N 10°54′52″E
- Operator: Rete Ferroviaria Italiana; Centostazioni
- Lines: Viareggio–Florence; Pistoia–Bologna
- Distance: 33.573 km (20.861 mi) from Firenze Santa Maria Novella
- Train operators: Trenitalia
- Connections: Urban and suburban buses

Other information
- Classification: Gold
Location
- Location within Tuscany Location within Italy

Pistoia railway station is the station of Pistoia in Piazza Dante. It is on the Viareggio–Florence railway, which connects Florence and Viareggio and it is at the beginning of the Porrettana railway to Bologna.

== Overview ==
The station has a subway linking platform 1 with platforms 2 and 3. It has no lifts for the disabled. The station is heavily used by students going to Prato, Florence, Lucca and Pisa. During the summer, traffic is concentrated towards Versilia and Viareggio. It is used by three million passengers each year. Only regional trains stop at the station since it is near Florence, which is served by long-distance trains.

== Gallery ==
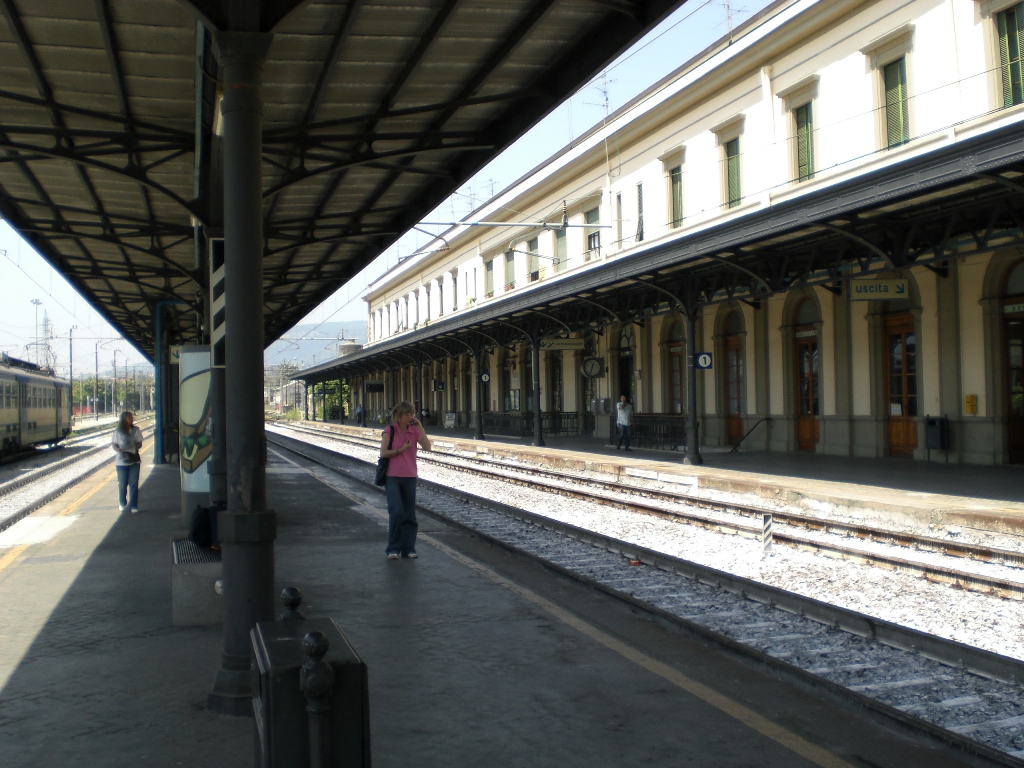

== See also ==
- History of rail transport in Italy
- List of railway stations in Tuscany
- Rail transport in Italy
- Railway stations in Italy
