= Apennine Base Tunnel =

Railway tunnel in central Italy

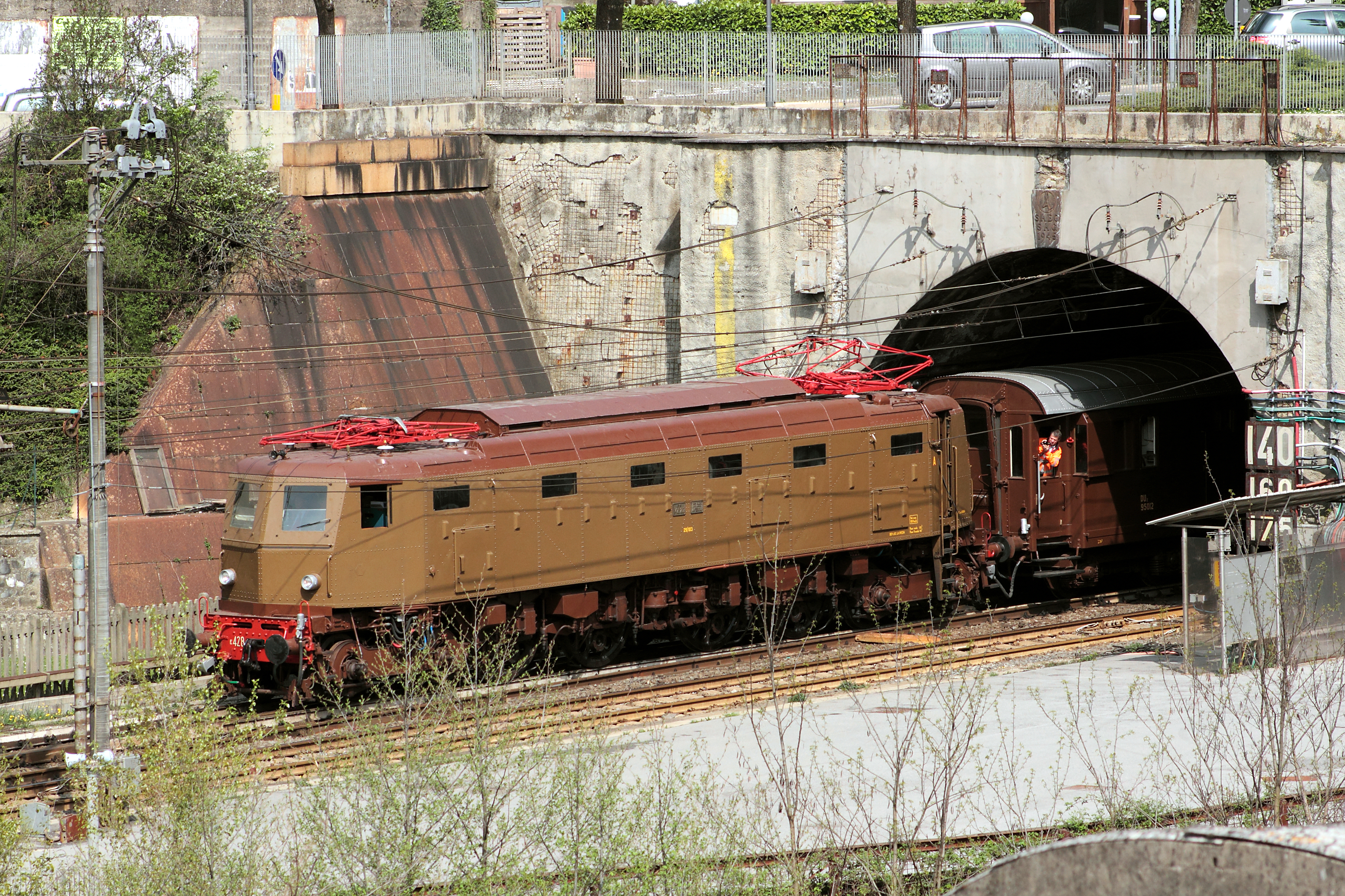

- Location within Italy

Overview
- Line: Bologna-Florence Direttissima
- Location: Italy
- Coordinates: 44.1357°N 11.173°E
- Status: Operational
- Crosses: Apennine Mountains

Operation
- Opened: 21 April 1934
- Traffic: Railway
- Character: Passenger and freight

Technical
- Length: 18.5 km (11.5 mi)
- No. of tracks: 2
- Track gauge: 1,435 mm (4 ft 8 1/2 in) (standard gauge)
- Electrified: 15 kV 16.7 Hz
- Operating speed: 250 km/h (160 mph)

The Apennine Base Tunnel, alternatively known as the Grand Apennine Tunnel, is a railway base tunnel 18.5 kilometres (11.5 mi) long on the Bologna-Florence Direttissima line in central Italy. At the time of its completion, the Apennine Base Tunnel was the world's second longest tunnel after the Simplon Tunnel, and the longest built with double track; presently, it is the 16th longest tunnel in the world.

The tunnel was opened on 21 April 1934; compared to the old Porrettana railway over the mountain range, its completion enabled an alternative route that was 35 kilometres (22 mi) shorter. Running between the stations of San Benedetto-Castiglione and Vernio-Montepiano-Cantagallo, it has a length of 18.5 kilometres (11.5 mi), a peak height of 328 metres (1,076 ft) above sea level and a maximum incline of 1.2%.

== Background and construction ==
The first railway line to complete a somewhat-direct route between the Italian cities of Bologna and Florence was the Porrettana railway, which was constructed between 1856 and 1864. It was recognised that the Porrettana line would be unfavourable for heavy freight trains even before its completion, which was due to the relatively mountainous terrain traversed by the line forcing the adoption of high gradients. It was also determined to be insufficient to handle the growing traffic between the Po Valley and Rome. However, civil engineers of the era recognised the challenges in building a more direct connection with greater capacity, various proposals involving different vertical and horizontal alignments were produced, but these hardly improved in terms of capacity or gradients over the original line due to a desire to reduce the length of any prospective tunnel.

During 1882, the French engineer Jean Louis Protche was appointed to examine proposals and suggest improvements; he opted for a line that followed the Setta and Bisenzio valleys to connect with the existing line at Sasso Marconi and Prato. It was Protche's route that first featured a crossing of the Apennines via a single large 18,032-metre (59,160 ft) tunnel. Around 1902, a special commission established by the Upper Council of Public Works examined the route studies and selected Protche's proposal, allegedly due to the alignment's more favourable terrain criteria, such as gradients and stability, best satisfied requirements the line. On the basis of the commission's report, the Italian government enacted Law No. 444/1908 during 1908, directing the final phase of design studies to proceed. At the time, the sum of 150 million lire was authorised to finance the Bologna-Florence Direttissima's construction, a substantial portion of which being allocated for the tunnel.

Despite this enactment, actual construction work of the tunnel did not commence until 1913. The rate of progress was relatively slow and intermittent largely due to external events, such as the First World War and the subsequent social turmoil suffered by the nation. It was not until 1921 that continuous activity was achieved. During 21 April 1934, the Apennine Base Tunnel, as well as much of the wider line, was finally inaugurated. Total expenditure on the line amounted to £1,122 million, £460 million of which being specifically spent on the tunnel.

== Operational history ==
In the middle of the tunnel, there is a switch-over and a 450 metres (1,480 ft) long station (not intended for public use), the latter is accessible via an adit.

Roughly 50 years following its completion, it was recognised that a persistent rise in traffic along the route would soon require greater capacity to satisfy. Simultaneously, there was also pressure for the infrastructure to meet new operational standards as part of a wider effort to bring Italy's railway network into a greater conformance with European norms and to better integrate with its neighbours, especially in regards to the fledgling high speed railway network that was expanding across the continent. Accordingly, the Bologna–Florence high-speed railway was constructed during the 1990s; its completion has seen some passenger traffic being drawn away from the older Bologna-Florence Direttissima line and the Apennine Base Tunnel alike.

Between 29 October 2001 and 20 May 2014, the Apennine Base Tunnel was subject to safety-orientated engineering works; these were largely centred around implementing modern fire-suppression equipment and associated emergency systems. During the same period, various aspects of the tunnel were improved and renovated, including the provision of new telecommunications facilities and public service lighting throughout its length.

=== Train 904 bombing ===
On 23 December 1984, 17 people were killed and 250 wounded by a bomb on the Naples-Milan Express, Train 904, which exploded in the tunnel. The attack is attributed to Cosa Nostra (the Sicilian Mafia).

The Italicus Express bombing in 1974 was on the same line, though was mere meters away from the exit in the tunnel.

== Literary references ==
The Apennine Tunnel is referred to and used as a plot device in Cabal by Michael Dibdin.
