= Caduti della Direttissima =

Workers who died constructing an Italian railroad

Caduti della Direttissima refers to the workers that died during the construction of the Bologna–Florence railway (Direttissima).

== History and geography ==
The railway line between Bologna and Florence (Direttissima) opened in 1934. Inside the railway there is a gallery which links the Apennines between Tuscany and Emilia Romagna, from Florence to Bologna, and it is situated between two train stations: Vernio-Montepiano-Cantagallo and San Benedetto Val di Sambro. The gallery is 18,507 metres (60,719 ft) long. On January 12, 1920, the excavation for the construction of the great gallery at the entrance to the south began and on July 20, 1920 at the north entrance. The excavation was fast enough. The tunnel was completed on December 4, 1929.

== Working conditions ==
The construction of the gallery involved workers from all over Italy and especially from Tuscan-Emilian countries where there was no work. The living conditions of the workers were very difficult: people went to work for the Bologna–Florence railway for necessity, but the work was very dangerous, tiring and not protected and the means of transport that brought to the work place did not exist. The work outside the tunnel consisted in working during the day and there was a break of one hour to eat. Inside the gallery, the workers had three continuous shifts of eight hours from morning to the evening. They worked on Sunday and had few holidays. The workers ate something quickly, sometimes in secret, between a job and the other. Team leaders were assigned the direct control of the work. The first teams were given the most dangerous phases: the temperature reached 60 °C (140 °F), the workers had to alternate every 5 minutes. The hard working conditions caused frequent incidents, the major causes were collapse and gas explosions or mine. In case of an incident, the workers were transported to the "ospedaletto" of Lagaro or to the Hospital "Mussolini" of Bologna. The conditions of the workers were not protected: the work was hard and it was easy to be fired, there was not a trade union to defend workers. The strike was not allowed. A positive aspect was that the workers had an insurance at work, and in case of illness, they had a minimum level of protection, but in case of serious injury, disability was recognized.

== Incidents ==
During the construction of the tunnel, 99 men died while they were working on it. Many incidents were caused by gas release, the most abundant one occurred on August 3, 1928, and it caused a fire in a building site and the suspension of the excavations for almost six months. Some of these incidents were caused by violent penetration of water that could cause deadly damage: the most tragic of the water leakage occurred on 4 November 1927, work had to be suspended. The dead workers are remembered on two plaques affixed to the entrance of Prato station, so that they will not be forgotten.
