= Prato Centrale railway station =

Railway station in Italy

Prato Centrale
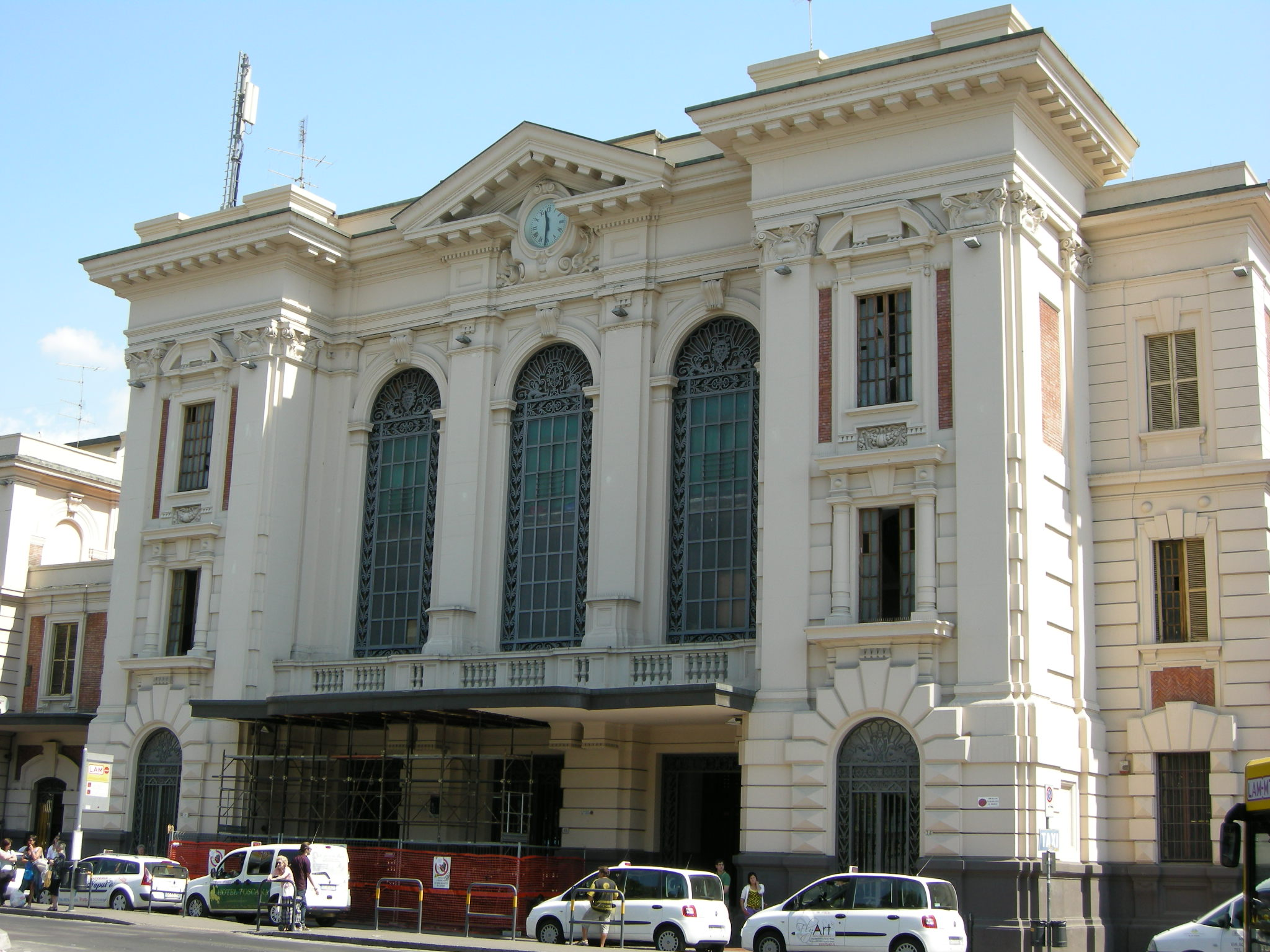
- View of the passenger building.

General information
- Location: Piazza Stazione 13; 59100 Prato PO; Prato, Prato, Tuscany; Italy
- Coordinates: 43°52′43″N 11°06′33″E
- Operator: Rete Ferroviaria Italiana; Centostazioni
- Lines: Bologna–Florence; Viareggio–Florence
- Distance: 16.386 km (10.182 mi) from Firenze Santa Maria Novella
- Train operators: Trenitalia
- Connections: Urban and suburban buses

Other information
- Classification: Gold

History
- Opened: April 1934; 92 years ago

Services
Preceding station	Trenitalia	Following station
Bologna Centrale towards Milano Centrale	InterCity Notte; Milan–Syracuse	Firenze Campo di Marte towards Siracusa
Location
- Location within Tuscany Location within Italy

Prato Centrale railway station (Italian: Stazione di Prato Centrale) is the main station serving the city and comune of Prato, in the region of Tuscany, central Italy. Opened in 1862, it forms part of both the Bologna–Florence railway and the Viareggio–Florence railway. Until 2002 it was named simply as Prato.

== Overview ==
The station is currently managed by Rete Ferroviaria Italiana (RFI). However, the commercial area of the passenger building is managed by Centostazioni. Train services to and from the station are operated by Trenitalia. Each of these companies is a subsidiary of Ferrovie dello Stato (FS), Italy's state-owned rail company.

There are two other stations in the city, namely Prato Porta al Serraglio (in the historical center of Prato) and the new station at Prato Borgonuovo.

The prato central railway station is situated on the Bologna-Florence direttissima railway line .

== See also ==
- History of rail transport in Italy
- List of railway stations in Tuscany
- Rail transport in Italy
- Railway stations in Italy
