= Bologna Centrale railway station =

Railway station in Bologna, Italy

Bologna Centrale
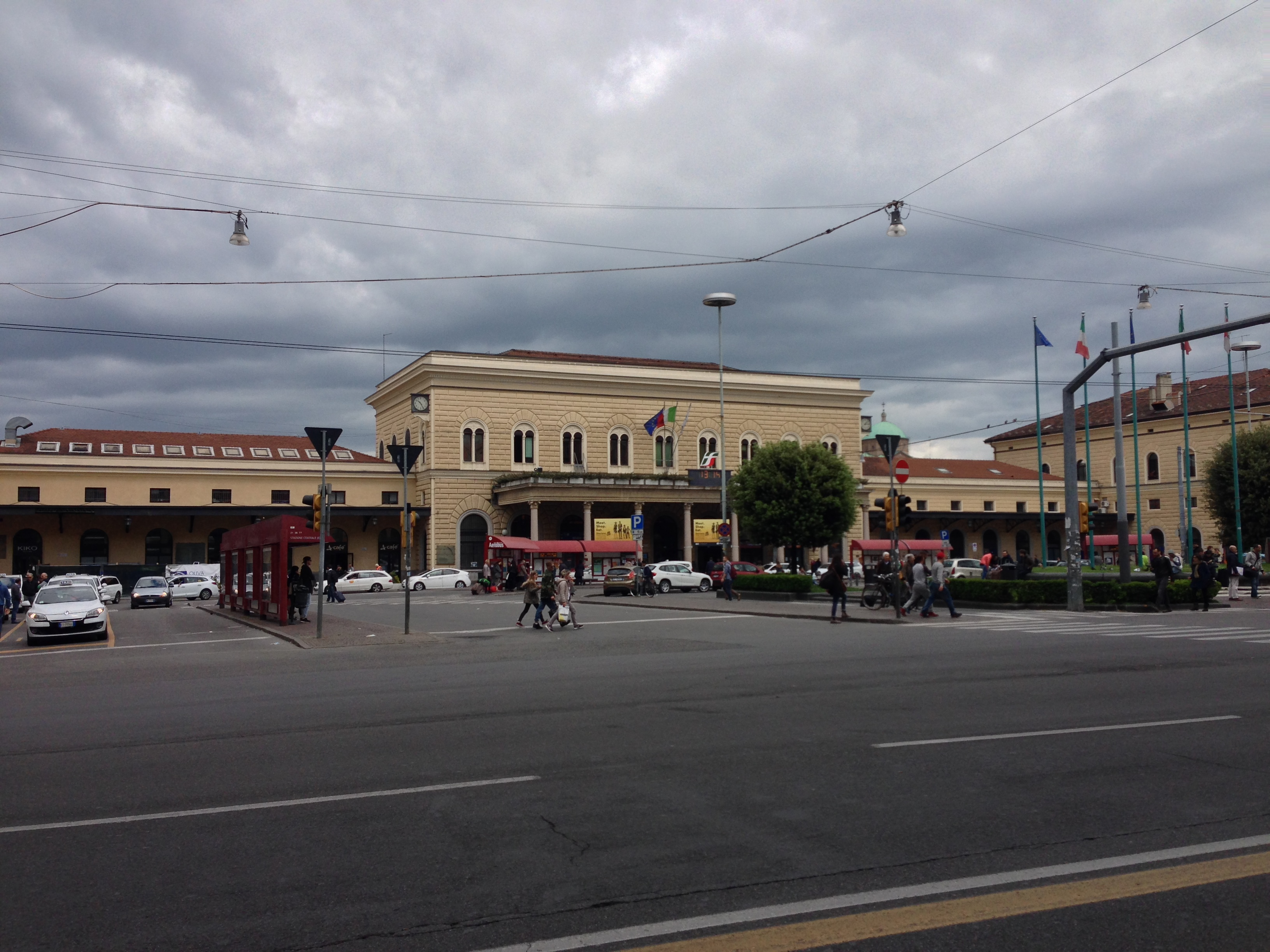
- View of the station building in 2016.

General information
- Location: Piazza delle Medaglie d'Oro; 40121 Bologna; Italy
- Coordinates: 44°30′21″N 11°20′30″E
- Owner: Rete Ferroviaria Italiana
- Operator: Grandi Stazioni
- Lines: Milan-Bologna (high-speed); Milan-Bologna (traditional); Verona-Bologna; Padua-Bologna; Bologna–Ancona; Bologna–Florence (high speed); Bologna–Florence (traditional); Bologna–Vignola; Bologna–Portomaggiore; Bologna–Pistoia
- Distance: 96.908 kilometres (60.216 mi) from Firenze Santa Maria Novella
- Platforms: 27

Construction
- Architect: Gaetano Ratti

Other information
- IATA code: IBT

History
- Opened: 1864; 162 years ago

Services
Preceding station	Trenitalia	Following station
Modena towards Milano Centrale	InterCity Notte; Milan–Syracuse	Prato Centrale towards Siracusa
Location
- Interactive fullscreen map

Bologna Centrale is the main railway station in Bologna, Italy. The station is situated at the northern edge of the city centre. It is located at the southern end of the Milan-Bologna high-speed line, which opened on 13 December 2008, and the northern end of three lines between Bologna and Florence: the original Bologna-Florence line through Porretta Terme and Pistoia; the Bologna–Florence Direttissima via Prato, which opened on 22 April 1934 and the Bologna-Florence high-speed line, which opened to traffic on 13 December 2009.

Bologna Centrale is the fifth-busiest in Italy in terms of passenger movements (about 58 million passengers per year). It is, however, one of the busiest, along with Rome Termini Station, for the number of train movements per day (about 800).

The station is linked to Bologna Guglielmo Marconi Airport by the Marconi Express, a direct monorail line 5-kilometre (3.1 mi) in length, launched on 18 November 2020.

== Station ==
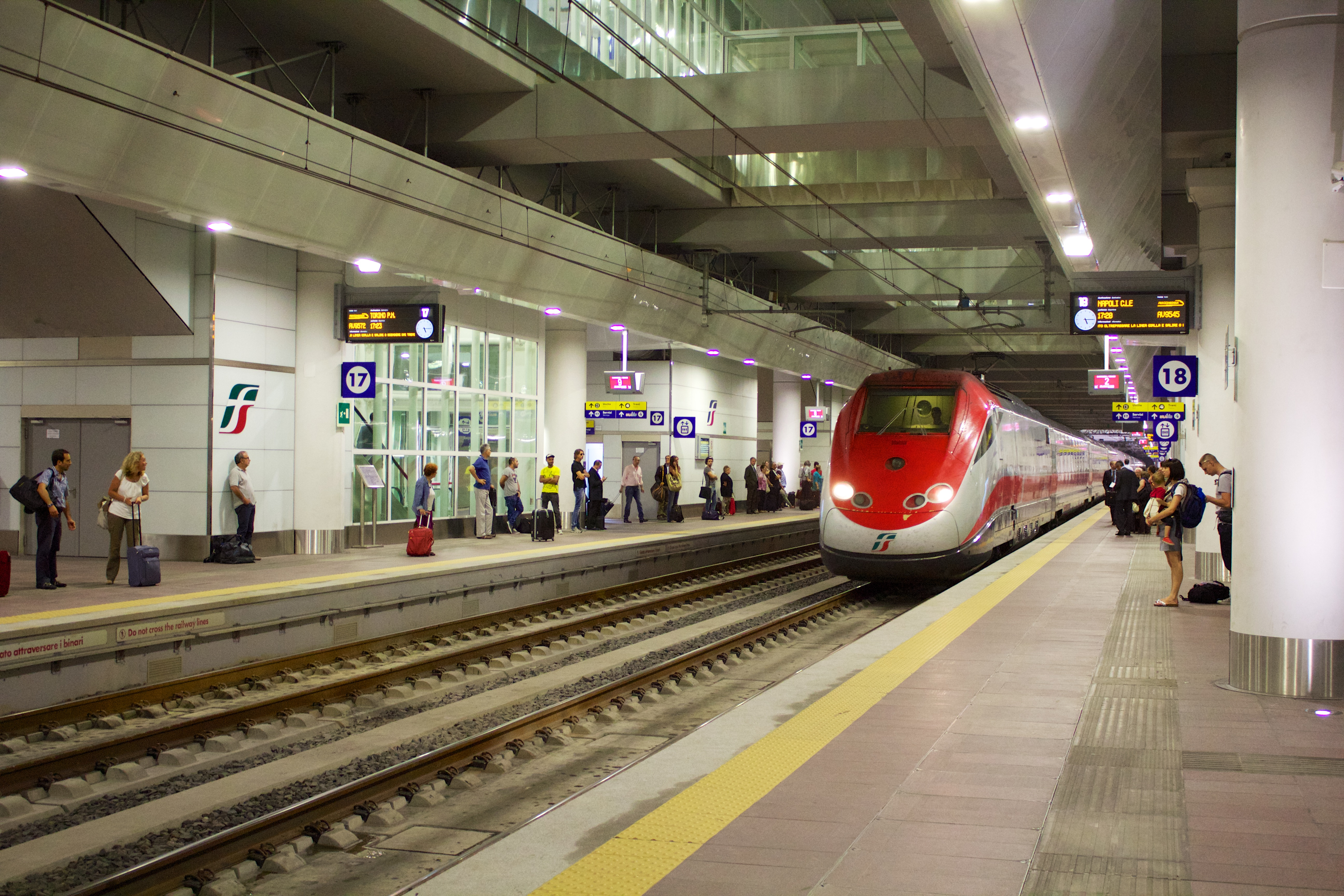
Bologna Central High Speed 2013

There are two levels of railway tracks within the station complex: Bologna Centrale and Bologna Centrale (AV) alta velocità (high speed). The central part of Bologna Centrale contains through tracks for high-speed trains (except Frecciarossa trains which travel only on the Milan-Bologna high-speed line), intercity and regional trains. In addition, there are two groups of side tracks: the western side has six tracks for regional trains from Milan or Verona (with Bologna Centrale as a terminus) and the eastern side has six tracks for regional trains from Prato, Ancona and Pescara (with Bologna Centrale as a terminus).

=== Bologna Centrale (AV) ===
In July 2008, Andrea Maffei Architects, Arata Isozaki & Associates, Ove Arup & Partners and M + T & Partners won a competition to design a new station, Bologna Centrale (AV), for high-speed trains between Milan and Florence. The proposal was selected by architect Gae Aulenti, as president of the International Competition Jury, and Rete Ferroviaria Italiana, the main entity behind the competition. The station uses light in its design, with the internal courtyards of the bridged station creating poles of light. Inside the station it is possible to see the levels below, and different shapes of windows were designed for the courtyards.

The new, three-level, railway station was built underneath the current station. It is 642 m (2,106 ft 4 in) long and 56 m (183 ft 9 in) wide, and consists of three below-ground levels. The first level, at −7 m (−23 ft 0 in) is for parking, pick-ups and drop-offs. The second level, at −15 m (−49 ft 3 in), is a shopping arcade. The lowest level, at −23 m (−75 ft 6 in), consists of four high-speed train platforms (lines 16 to 19).

The underground platforms opened for passenger service on 9 June 2013. Together with the reinstatement of four surface tracks, which were removed to facilitate construction, the project is due to be completed by 2016. The expected cost was €340 million.

This high-speed station is connected by a series of walkways and elevators to the central part. Transfer time is approximately 10 minutes on foot.

== History ==
The first Bologna Centrale station was constructed in 1859, though its history is unclear. A new station was built twelve years later on the same grounds.

The modern station was designed and built by architect Gaetano Ratti, who trained in the local Clementine Academy. Inspired by the neoclassical style, the station's distinctive 15th century façade opens in nine entrance doors. The main passenger building is reminiscent of renaissance Florentine architecture. Until the 1940s, it was topped by a clock tower with marble pillars, but the tower was damaged by allied bombings in the Second World War and not rebuilt.

The original design called for a rectangular shaped, two-faced building, with a marble external façade and a steel internal one. Subsequent extension works, such as the 1926 building of the westbound platforms, shaped the station into the “L” form, typical of expanded transit stations. The introduction of new platforms at the eastern half in 1934, brought another change to the station's configuration.

=== 1980 terrorist bombing ===
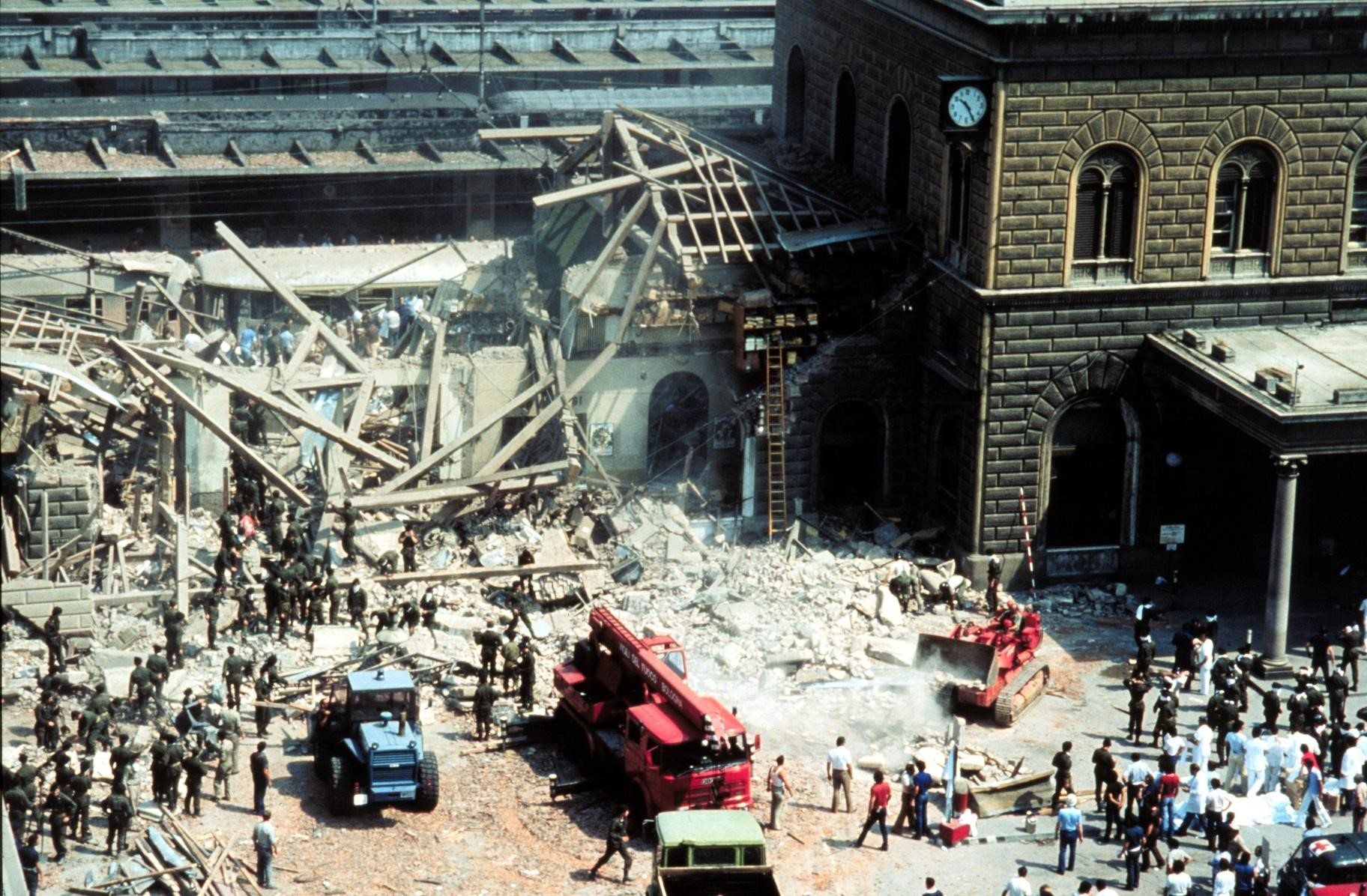
A dozen of team workers are making their way inside the railway station, after the aftermath of the Bologna massacre, in 1980.

On 2 August 1980 at 10.25 am, an improvised explosive device (IED) made with 20 kilograms (44 lb) of a TNT mixture was detonated inside Bologna's main railway station. The IED was contained in a suitcase, which was placed near the wall inside a lobby. The explosion killed 85 people and injured over 200 more. The wing of the station in which the bomb was detonated has been reconstructed but, as a testimony to the victims of the attack, the original floor tile and a deep crack in the main wall have been maintained. Additionally, the exterior clock at the station was permanently fixed to 10:25, the time of the explosion, in 1996 as a commemoration. The attack is also known in Italy as the Strage di Bologna, the Bologna massacre.

The Italian government immediately accused the Italian neo-fascist militant groups for the attack; however this was denied by the group, and no one ever claimed responsibility. After 15 years, official investigation has determined that the attack was carried out by a small neo-fascist group, call Nuclei Armati Rivoluzionari. Many conspiracy theories regarding this event have been entertained, including a link between this act of terrorism and the loss of Itavia Flight 870 six weeks prior.

== Train services ==
The following services call at the station (incomplete):

=== Domestic (High-speed) AV Station ===
- High-speed train (Trenitalia Frecciarossa) Turin-Salerno: Turin - Milan - Bologna - Florence - Rome - Naples - Salerno
- High-speed train (Trenitalia Frecciargento) Bolzano/Bozen-Rome: Bolzano/Bozen - Trento/Trient - Verona - Bologna - Florence - Rome
- High-speed train (Italo NTV) Turin-Salerno: Turin (Porta Susa) - Milan (Porto Garibaldi) - Bologna - Florence - Rome (Tiburtina) - Naples - Salerno
- High-speed train (Italo NTV) Venice-Salerno: Venice - Padua - Bologna - Florence - Rome (Tiburtina) - Naples - Salerno
- High-speed train (Italo NTV) Brescia-Naples: (Brescia) - Verona - Bologna - Florence - Rome - Naples

=== Domestic (High-speed) ===
- High-speed train (Trenitalia Frecciarossa) Venice-Naples: Venice - Padua - (Ferrara) - Verona - Bologna - Florence - Rome - Naples
- High-speed train (Trenitalia Frecciarossa) Venice-Rome/Rome Airport: Venice - Padua - (Ferrara) - Verona - Bologna - Florence - Rome - Rome-Fiumicino 'Leonardo da Vinci' Airport
- High-speed train (Italo) Turin-Ancona: Turin (Porta Susa) - Milan (Porto Garibaldi) - Bologna - Rimini - Ancona
- High speed train (Trenitalia Frecciarossa) Milan-Bari: Milan - Bologna - Rimini - Ancona - Pescara - Foggia – Bari
- High-speed train (Trenitalia Frecciargento) Brescia-Rome: Brescia - Verona - Bologna - Florence - Rome
- High-speed train (Trenitalia Frecciabianca) Milan-Lecce: Milan - Parma - Modena - Bologna - Rimini - Ancona - Pescara - Foggia - Bari - Brindisi - Lecce
- High-speed train (Trenitalia Frecciabianca) Milan-Bari/Taranto: Milan - Parma - Modena - Bologna - Rimini - Ancona - Pescara - Foggia - Bari - Taranto
- High-speed train (Trenitalia Frecciabianca) Venice-Lecce: Venice - Padua - Verona - Bologna - Rimini - Ancona - Pescara - Foggia - Bari - Brindisi - Lecce

=== Domestic ===
- Night train (Trenitalia Intercity Notte) Trieste/Triest-Rome: Trieste/Triest - Venice - Padua - Verona - Bologna - Florence - Rome
- Night train (Trenitalia Intercity Notte) Milan-Lecce: Milan - Parma - Bologna - Rimini - Ancona - Pescara - Foggia - Bari - (Taranto) - Brindisi - Lecce
- Night train (Trenitalia Intercity Notte) Turin-Lecce: Turin - Alessandria - Bolgona - Rimini - Ancona - Pescara - Foggia - Bari - Brindisi - Lecce
- Night train (Trenitalia Intercity Notte) Turin-Reggio di Calabria: Turin - Milan - Bologna - Florence - Rome - Naples - Salerno - Lamezia Terme - Reggio di Calabria
- Night train (Trenitalia Intercity Notte) Bolzano/Bozen-Rome: Bolzano/Bozen - Trento/Trient - Verona - Bologna - Florence - Rome
- Intercity train (Trenitalia Intercity) Milan-Lecce: Milan - Parma - Modena - Bologna - Rimini - Ancona - Pescara - Foggia - Bari - Brindisi - Lecce
- Intercity train (Trenitalia Intercity) Milan-Naples: Milan - Parma - Modena - Bologna - Prato - Florence - Arezzo - Rome - Latina - Naples
- Intercity train (Trenitalia Intercity) Trieste/Triest-Rome: Trieste/Triest - Venice - Padua - Ferrara - Bologna - Prato - Florence - Arezzo - Rome
- Intercity train (Trenitalia Intercity) Bologna-Lecce: Bologna - Rimini - Ancona - Pescara - Foggia - Bari - Brindisi - Lecce
- Intercity train (Trenitalia Intercity) Bologna-Bari/Taranto: Bologna - Rimini - Ancona - Pescara - Foggia - Bari - Taranto
- Regional train (Trenitalia Regional) Bologna-Venice: Bologna - Ferrara - Rovigo - Padua - Venice
- Regional train (Trenitalia Regional) Bologna-Voghera: Voghera - Piacenza - Parma - Modena - Bologna
- Regional train (Trenitalia Regional Express) Piacenza-Ancona: (Milan) - Piacenza - Parma - Reggio Emilia - Modena - Bologna - Forli - Rimini - Ancona
- Regional train (Trenitalia Regional) Bologna-Brennero/Brenner: Bologna - Mirandola - Poggio Rusco - Ostiglia - Nogara - Isola della Scala - Verona - Ala/Ahl-am-Etsch - Rovereto/Rofreit - Trento/Trient - Mezzocorona/Kronmetz - Ora/Auer - Bolzano/Bozen - Ponte Gardena/Waidbruck - Chiusa/Klausen - Bressanone/Brixen - Fortezza/Franzensfeste - Vipiteno/Sterzing - Brennero/Brenner
- Regional train (Trenitalia Regional) Bologna-Prato: Bologna - Prato
- Regional train (Trenitalia Regional) Bologna-Porretta Terme: Bologna - Borgonuovo - Porretta Terme
- Regional train (Trenitalia Regional) Bologna/Modena-Mantua: (Bologna) - Modena - Suzzara - Mantua

=== Cross-border ===
(A for Austria, D for Germany, F for France, GB for Great Britain)

- Intercity train (ÖBB EuroCity) Munich-Verona/Bologna: Bologna - Verona - Rovereto/Rofreit - Trento/Trient - Bolzano/Bozen - Bressanone/Brixen - Fortezza/Franzensfeste - Brennero/Brenner - Innsbruck(A) - Jenbach(A) - Kufstein(A) - Munich(D)
- Night train (DB CityNightLine) Rome/Milan-Munich: (Rome) - (Florence) - (Bologna) - Verona - Trento/Trient - Bolzano/Bozen - Innsbruck(A) - Jenbach(A) - Kufstein(A) - Munich(D)
- Night train (ÖBB EuroNight) Rome/Milan-Vienna: (Rome) - (Livorno) - Florence - Bologna - Verona - Padua - Venice - Villach(A) - Klagenfurt(A) - Vienna(A)
- Tourist train (Venice-Simplon Orient Express) Rome-London: Rome - Florence - Bologna - Verona - Innsbruck(A) - Paris (East)(F) - London(GB)

== Nearby public transport ==
The Marconi Express monorail links the station to Bologna Guglielmo Marconi Airport, with an intermediate stop at Lazzaretto. The Marconi Express terminal is located within the station complex.

The station's outside terminal is also one of the most important bus interchanges of Bologna and has stops also near the High-Speed platforms:

- Rail Replacement Buses to Ferrara, Parma, Vignola, Portomaggiore, Prato and San Benedetto Val di Sambro
- Urban Bus Routes C, D, 21, 25, 25A, 30, 35, 36, 37, 38 and 39 by TPER
- Urban Trolleybus Routes 15, 32 and 33 by TPER
- Suburban Bus Routes 81, 81A, 87, 87A, 91 and 91A by TPER and TPB subcompanies
- Special Bus Routes Q, 77 and 975 by TPER
- Interurban Bus Routes 671 and 677 by TPER

== See also ==
- History of rail transport in Italy
- List of railway stations in Emilia-Romagna
- Rail transport in Italy
- Railway stations in Italy
- 11 March 2004 Madrid attacks
- List of terrorist incidents
- Bologna metropolitan railway service
