= Firenze Campo di Marte railway station =

Railway station in Italy

Firenze Campo di Marte
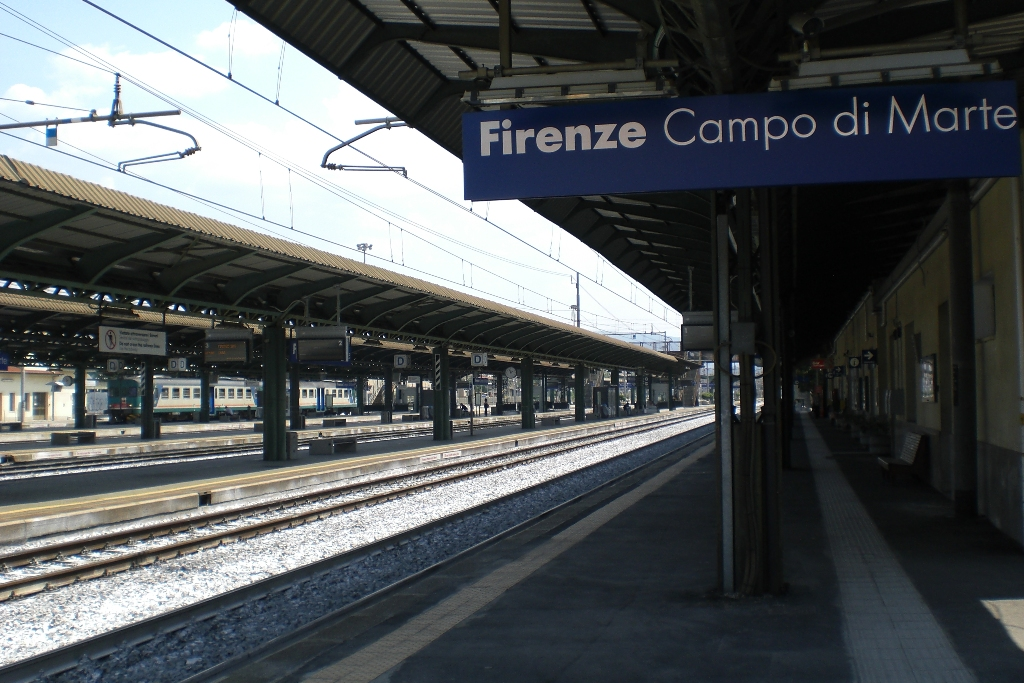
- View of the platforms.

General information
- Location: Via Mannelli 12; 50132 Florence; Italy
- Coordinates: 43°46′39″N 11°16′35″E
- Owner: Rete Ferroviaria Italiana
- Operator: Rete Ferroviaria Italiana
- Lines: Florence–Rome; Florence–Faenza
- Distance: 310.112 km (192.695 mi) from Roma Termini
- Platforms: 9

Other information
- IATA code: FIR

Services
Preceding station	Trenitalia	Following station
Prato Centrale towards Milano Centrale	InterCity Notte; Milan–Syracuse	Salerno towards Siracusa
Location
- Location within Tuscany Location within Italy

Firenze Campo di Marte (or, simply, Firenze Campo Marte) (IATA: FIR) is the third railway station of Florence and the eighth station of Tuscany and the biggest station in south Florence. The station is mostly used by commuters going to Florence coming from the nearby countryside

== Overview ==
It is approximately 2km from central Florence, which can be reached by regular connecting services to/from Santa Maria Novella.

All regional trains going south and Santa Maria Novella stop at the station. Moreover, high-speed trains that do not go through Firenze Santa Maria Novella railway station pass through here, making it an alternative station. Also, some InterCity, express, and international trains serve Campo di Marte. The station controls most of the traffic in the Florentine area.

The station has nine platforms all covered by a station-roof. There are self-service dispensers on platforms 2 and 3, 4 and 5. In 2009, the station platforms are being raised to 55 cm. This will make easier for passengers to get on and off the trains. RFI is improving the station because Campo di Marte is going to be the temporary high speed terminal due for works that are going to create the underground high speed station Firenze Belfiore.

The station is near to the Stadio Artemio Franchi, home stadium of Fiorentina. It has 4,800 passenger movements daily.

== Train services ==
The following services call at the station (incomplete):

- High speed services (Frecciargento) Bolzano/Bozen - Verona - Bologna - Florence - Rome
- High speed services (Frecciargento) Bergamo - Brescia - Verona - Bologna - Florence - Rome

== See also ==
- History of rail transport in Italy
- List of railway stations in Tuscany
- Rail transport in Italy
- Railway stations in Italy
