= Bologna–Florence high-speed railway =

Key north central Italian transport link

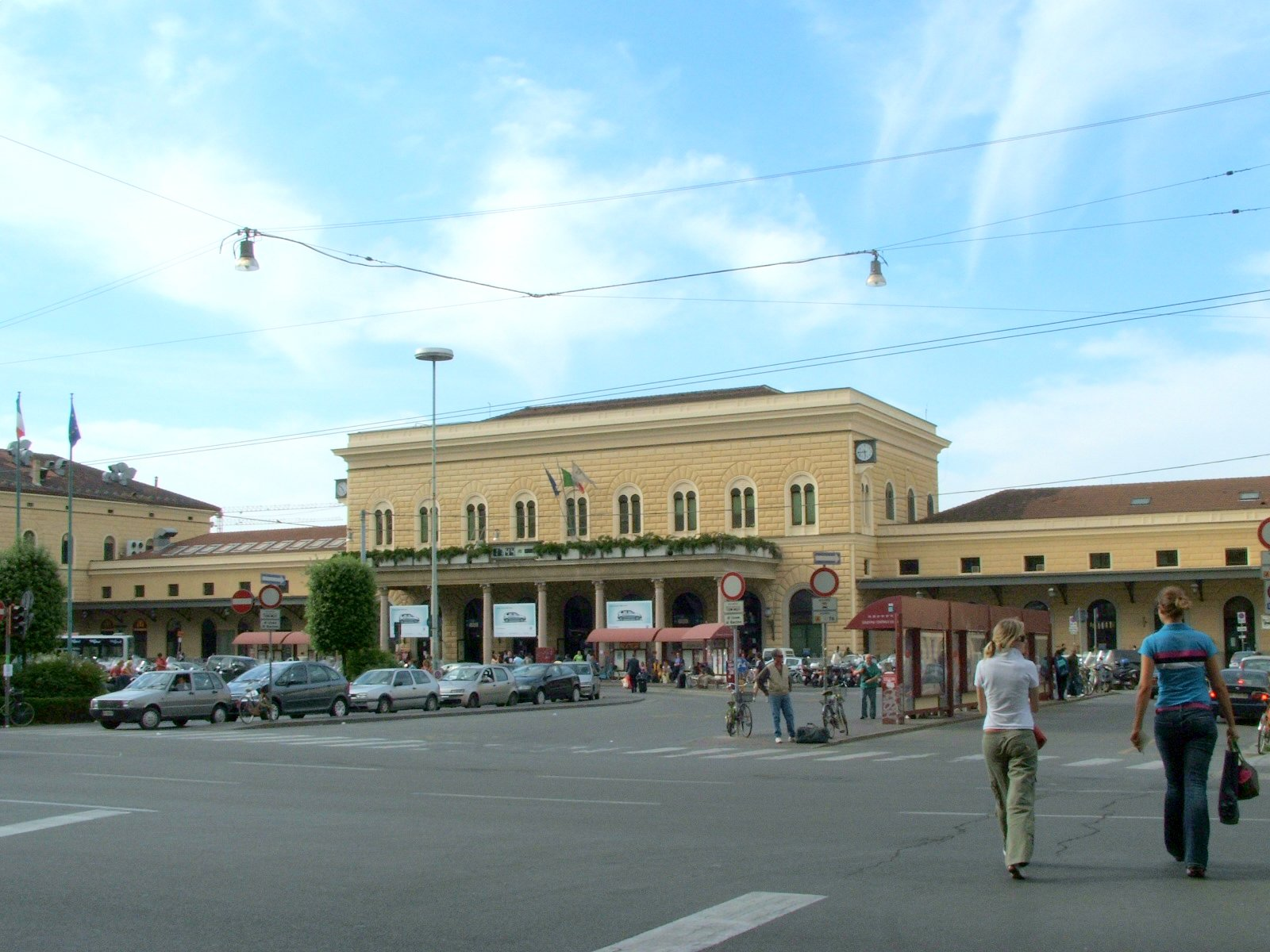
- Bologna–Florence high-speed railway

Overview
- Status: Operational
- Owner: Rete Ferroviaria Italiana
- Locale: Italy

Service
- System: Italian high-speed rail system

History
- Opened: 5 December 2009
Route map
- Source: Italian railway atlas

The Bologna–Florence high-speed railway is a link in the Italian high-speed rail network. It is part of Corridor 1 of the European Union's Trans-European high-speed rail network, which connects Berlin and Palermo. Full commercial operations commenced on 5 December 2009. High-speed passenger trains take 37 minutes over the route compared to about 59 minutes previously.

The line's northern end is at Bologna Centrale railway station and it connects with the Milan–Bologna high-speed line and lines to Venice (Padua–Bologna railway) and Verona (Verona–Bologna railway), respectively. Its southern end is at Firenze Santa Maria Novella railway station and it connects with the Florence–Rome high-speed line. It is largely used by high-speed passenger trains, while the majority of goods trains have continued to use the old Bologna–Florence railway, known as the Direttissima. Since 2018, high speed freight services have also been run upon the line.

== History ==
=== Background ===
Prior to the construction of the Bologna–Florence high-speed railway, the existing Bologna–Florence railway, popularly known as the Direttissima, had been handling the majority of this traffic at a primary trunk route. This line, which had been completed in 1934, had been built as a superior alternative to the nineteenth century Pistoia–Bologna railway, providing both higher speeds and additional capacity to traffic. However, by the 1980s, it was becoming clear that the capacity of both of these railways were becoming saturated, and that the existing infrastructure would not be able to accommodate much more growth in demand, particularly in light of changing operational circumstances. While capable for the era in which they were built, neither line conformed with the increasingly high standards of modern European railways, and there was a political desire for Italy's core railway network to be upgraded to these same standards to improve service levels and to better integrate with the continental high speed network.

Even in light of this willingness to construct a new national high speed railway network, the Bologna-Florence route was recognised as posing particular difficulty. The region's terrain had long challenged numerous civil engineers when building most forms of infrastructure, it directly confronted any effort to build a straighter railway (necessary for high speed operations), particularly the flatter gradients that were typically sought. As such, it was determined that the successful construction of the Bologna-Florence high speed line would constitutes the greatest design and construction commitment of the whole national network.

=== Construction ===
During 1992, Treno Alta Velocità (TAV), a special subsidiary of the Italian railway infrastructure company Rete Ferroviaria Italiana (RFI) was granted a concession for the design, construction and management of Italy's new high speed railway lines for a period of 50 years. In turn, TAV selected several engineering companies as general contractors, performing the design and construction of these lines, including the Bologna-Florence section, which was allocated to FIAT Engineering S.p.A. and the CAVETconsortium, while Rocksoil S.p.A was appointed to design the line's extensive underground works. Environmental impact studies and the executive design phase commenced during early 1992, with TAV issuing the alignment's general design to FIAT.

The geological surveys determined that fully mechanised tunneling was suited to some, but not all, locations. Accordingly, the excavation methods used often varied between individual tunnels, which some requiring preparatory reinforcement along with other mitigatory measures in areas of instability or other challenging characteristics. Defined plans that conformed with ISO 9002 quality assurance systems were produced to guide the excavation phase of each area. FIAT, the project's general contractor, accepted responsibility for all unforeseen events, including any geological factors. The construction phase commenced immediately following the awarding of a contract in July 1996.

During October 2005, all excavation work, which included every tunnel section, was completed. Three years later, construction of the railway's infrastructure, including the overhead electrification, was declared to be complete. Testing of the line commenced in December 2008. The railway was formally transferred over to TAV's control on 30 June 2009. The first commercial service to use the line was conducted on 4 December 2009, while the new high-speed railway was officially opened during the following day.

While the cost of constructing the line had been estimated to roughly €1 billion (1991 values in lire converted to euros) at the project's start, it ultimately costed €5.2 billion (€67 million per kilometre, €108 million per mile) to complete.

== Features ==
The line is 78.5 kilometres (48.8 mi) long and includes 73.8 kilometres (45.9 mi) of tunnels, 3.6 kilometres (2.2 mi) on embankment or in cutting and 1.1 kilometres (0.68 mi) on viaduct. From Bologna to Florence, the tunnels are:

- Pianoro tunnel, 10,841 m (6.736 mi)
- Sadurano tunnel, 3,855 m (2.395 mi)
- Monte Bibele tunnel, 9,243 m (5.743 mi)
- Raticosa tunnel, 10,450 m (6.493 mi)
- Scheggianico tunnel, 3,558 m (2.211 mi)
- Firenzuola tunnel, 15,285 m (9.498 mi)
- Borgo Rinzelli tunnel, 717 m (0.446 mi)
- Morticine tunnel, 654 m (0.406 mi)
- Vaglia tunnel, 18,713 m (11.628 mi)

Maximum rock coverage over tunnels is about 600 to 700 metres (2,000 to 2,300 ft). All tunnels are double track. Each tunnel has an intermediate access from the surface about every 5 kilometres (3.1 mi), except the Vaglia tunnel, which instead has a parallel service tunnel for about half of its length.

Akin to the rest of Italy's modern high speed lines, the Level 2 of ETCS ("European Train Control System", the signaling part of the European Rail Traffic Management System (ERTMS) program) has been installed throughout. This was installed without any traditional fallback system, such as physical lineside signals, yielding considerable cost savings due to the reduction in trackside equipment required and along with an ongoing decrease in associated trackside maintenance costs. ETCS enables a significant increase in traffic capacity over historic signalling counterparts.
