= Viareggio–Florence railway =

Railway line in Italy

Overview
- Status: in use
- Owner: RFI
- Locale: Tuscany, Italy
- Termini: Viareggio; Florence

Service
- Type: Heavy rail
- Operator(s): Trenitalia

History
- Opened: 21 December 1890

Technical
- Line length: 100 km (62 mi)
- Track gauge: 1,435 mm (4 ft 8 1/2 in) standard gauge
- Electrification: 3 kV DC overhead line

The Viareggio–Florence railway (Italian: Ferrovia Viareggio-Firenze) is a line built between 1848 and 1890 connecting the Tuscan cities of Florence, Prato, Pistoia, Lucca and Viareggio. The first section from Florence to Pistoia (which was in the Grand Duchy of Tuscany at the time) was named in honour of Princess Maria Antonia of the Two Sicilies, wife of Leopold II, Grand Duke of Tuscany, who had already been honoured in the naming of the Leopolda railway from Florence to Livorno. It is fully electrified at 3,000 V DC. Passenger traffic is managed by Trenitalia.

== History ==
The young Duke Leopold II was a liberal and interested in developments in technology, so while leaving the initiative to the private sector, favored the birth of the first Italian railways. In the same period as the line Leopolda railway was being developed between Livorno and Florence, he developed the design and implementation of the Maria Antonia railway. In 1845 the memorandum and articles of association for a company to build the Maria Antonia railway from Florence to Prato and Pistoia were published.

On 3 February 1848 the line was opened to traffic between Florence and Prato, together with the Maria Antonia station, which eventually developed into Firenze Santa Maria Novella station. In 1851 it reached Pistoia. On 3 February 1859 a section of the line being built from Lucca connected with the line from Pistoia at the Serravalle tunnel. This connected with the Pisa–Lucca railway, which had been opened by another company on 20 September 1846, opening up a new route from Florence to Pisa via Pistoia and Lucca. The Maria Antonia and Leopolda lines were separate in Florence until 1860, despite their stations being only one kilometre (0.62 mi) apart. They were in fact first connected via Lucca and Pisa.

The engineering works were very simple and devoid of significant structures as it was the least important of the lines in the grand duchy. It gained much importance in 1864 when, with the opening of the Porrettana railway, the section east of Pistoia became an integral part of the Bologna-Florence main line.

In 1890 the section from Lucca to Viareggio was opened.

In 1934 the opening of the Bologna–Florence Direttissima, leaving the Maria Antonia line at Prato, relegated the line from Prato to Pistoia and its continuation to Lucca to a secondary role; similarly the Porrettana line’s role was also much reduced.

== Current situation ==
The line between Florence and Prato has been quadrupled in recent years. In December 2009 the new Bologna–Florence high-speed line opened from a new junction with the Maria Antonia railway near Firenze Castello railway station, reducing traffic between Castello and Prato.

On 17 November 2008 the government approved a plan was to double the section between Lucca and Pistoia, estimated to cost €257 million. This will initially double the section between Pistoia and Montecatini Terme. Then the route through the Serravalle pass will be rebuilt with a new two-track tunnel with consequent abandonment of the current single-track tunnel. Finally then the section between Montecatini and Lucca would be doubled. Also planned is an underground station in Montecatini to allow the line to pass under the entire village. It is expected that work will be completed between 2012 and 2014 and that the line will then handle over 28 trains per day each way, including two fast trains per hour.

== See also ==
- List of railway lines in Italy

== Bibliography ==
- RFI - Fascicolo linea 94
