= Livorno Centrale railway station =

Railway station in Livorno, Italy

Livorno Centrale
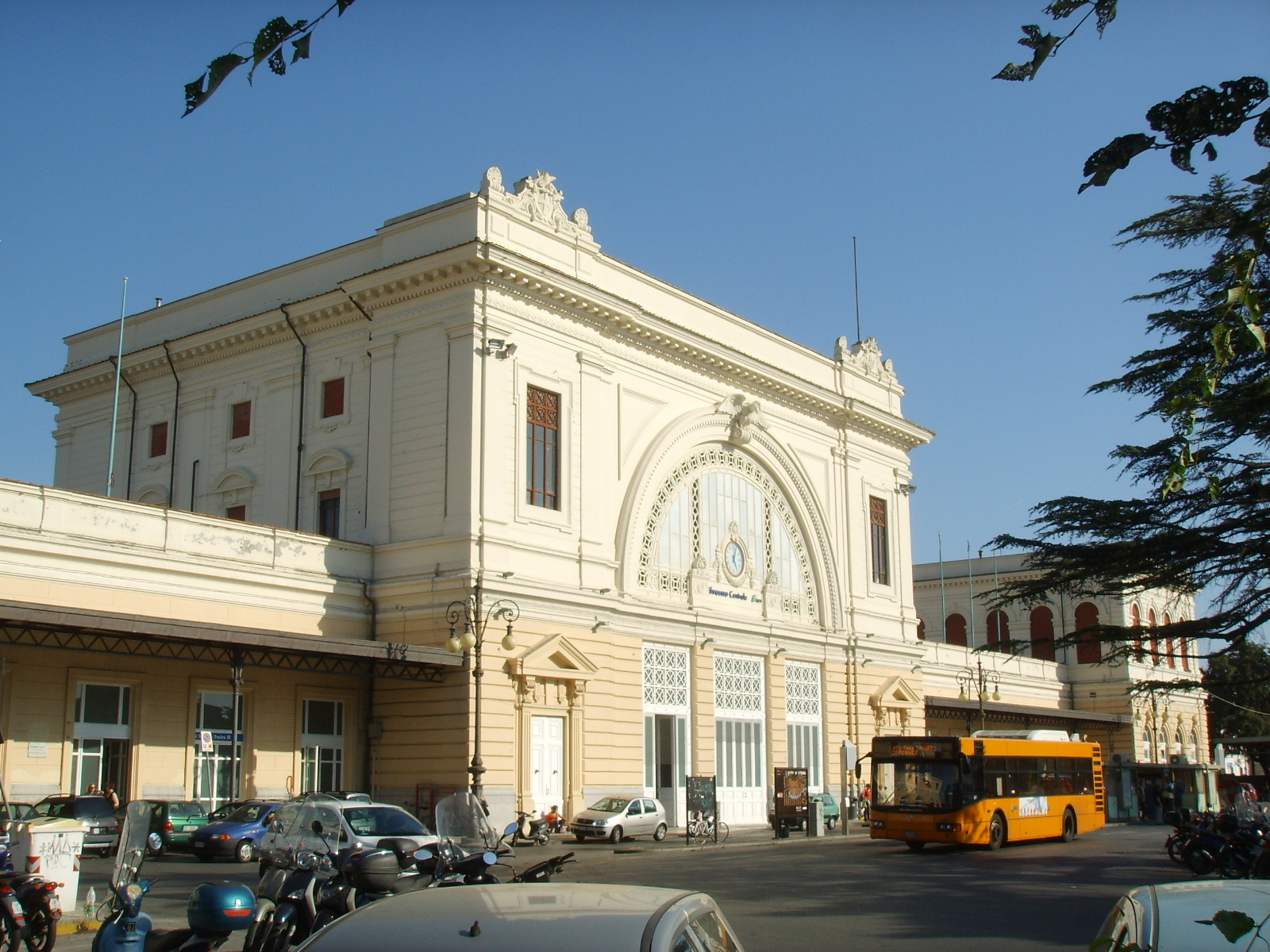
- Livorno Centrale station

General information
- Location: Piazza Dante; 57124 Livorno LI; Livorno, Livorno, Tuscany; Italy
- Coordinates: 43°33′15″N 10°20′09″E
- Operator: Rete Ferroviaria Italiana; Centostazioni
- Lines: Livorno–Pisa–Florence; Livorno–Rome
- Distance: 27.766 km (17.253 mi) from Vada
- Train operators: Trenitalia
- Connections: Urban and suburban buses

Other information
- Classification: Gold

History
- Opened: 3 July 1910; 116 years ago
Location
- Location within Tuscany Location within Italy

Livorno Centrale railway station (Italian: Stazione di Livorno Centrale) is the main station of the Italian city of Livorno. It is situated in the Piazza Dante on the eastern edge of the town. It is on the Pisa–Livorno–Rome line and handles nearly 5,300,000 passengers annually. Trains of various types stop at the station, including Inter-city and Eurostar.

== History ==
The railway line between Livorno San Marco station and the Leopolda station in Pisa was opened in 1844. In 1867 the railway from Rome to Livorno was completed, but instead of following the coast, north of Cecina it went inland towards Collesalvetti, where it turned west to Livorno. In 1873 Collesalvetti was connected directly with Pisa, so that Livorno was effectively bypassed by the main line. In 1910 a direct link along the coast between Cecina and Livorno was completed, putting Livorno back on the main line.

Livorno Centrale station was opened on 3 July 1910 a few days after the completion of the works of the coastal line. The passenger building, located at the end of a great tree-lined avenue, was designed by the engineer Mangini, although its monumental façade, including a large semicircular window, was designed by the engineer Frullani.

== Description ==
The station consists of three large buildings, joined by two lower wings. The main building, which includes the ticket office, is characterized by high pillars topped by an arch with windows, and large vertical windows. Its interior is dominated by its impressive ticket office, decorated with marble and stucco, with lateral branching corridors and entrances to the platforms. Two underpasses connect to the seven platforms, which have fine canopies supported by slender columns. The underpass to the south also gives access to the park and ride facility behind the station, not far from PalaLivorno stadium in the Porta Terra neighbourhood.

== Gallery ==
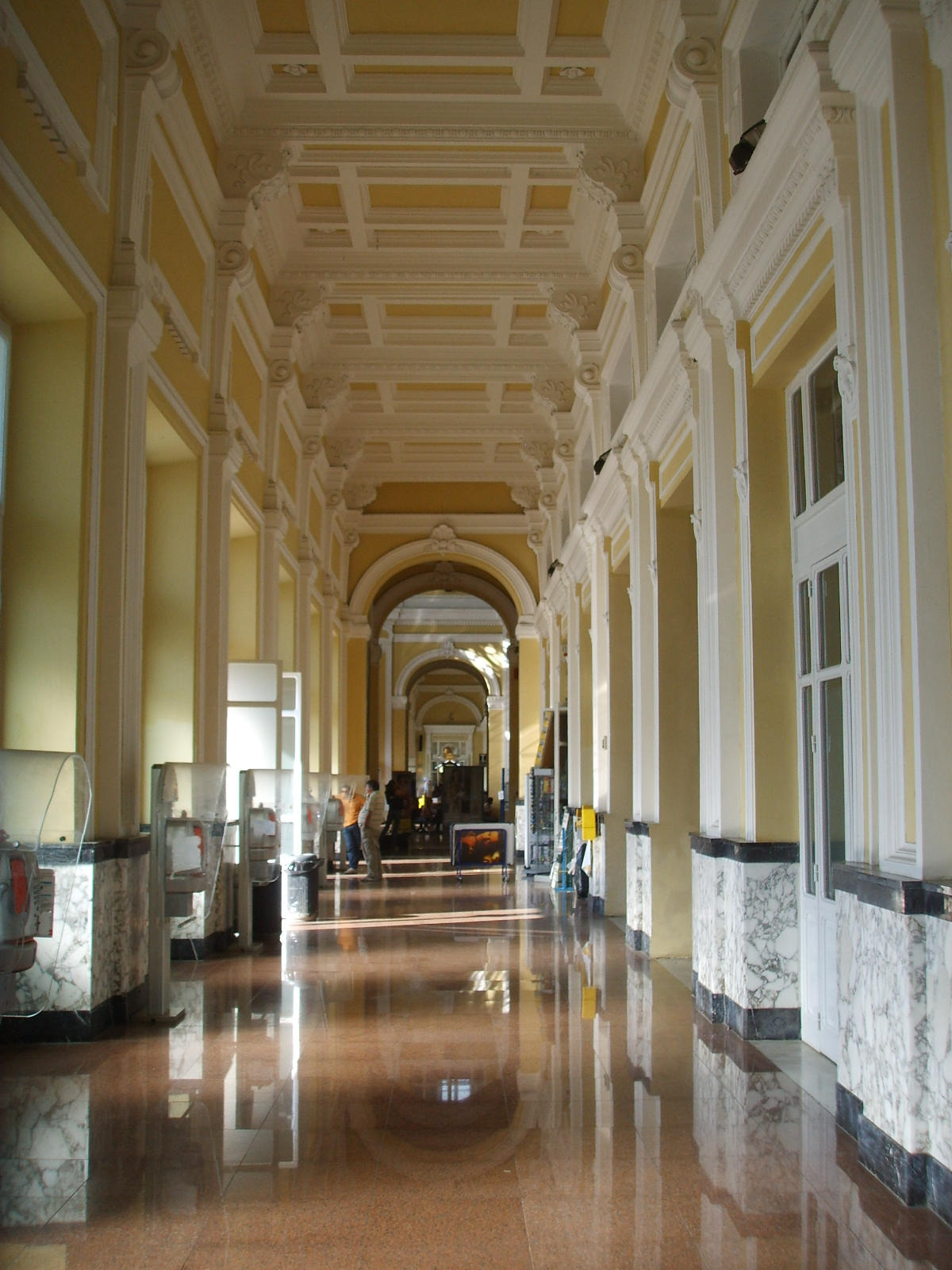
Interior view.

== See also ==
- History of rail transport in Italy
- List of railway stations in Tuscany
- Rail transport in Italy
- Railway stations in Italy
