= Pistoia–Bologna railway =

Railway line in Emilia-Romagna, Italy

Bologna–Pistoia railway
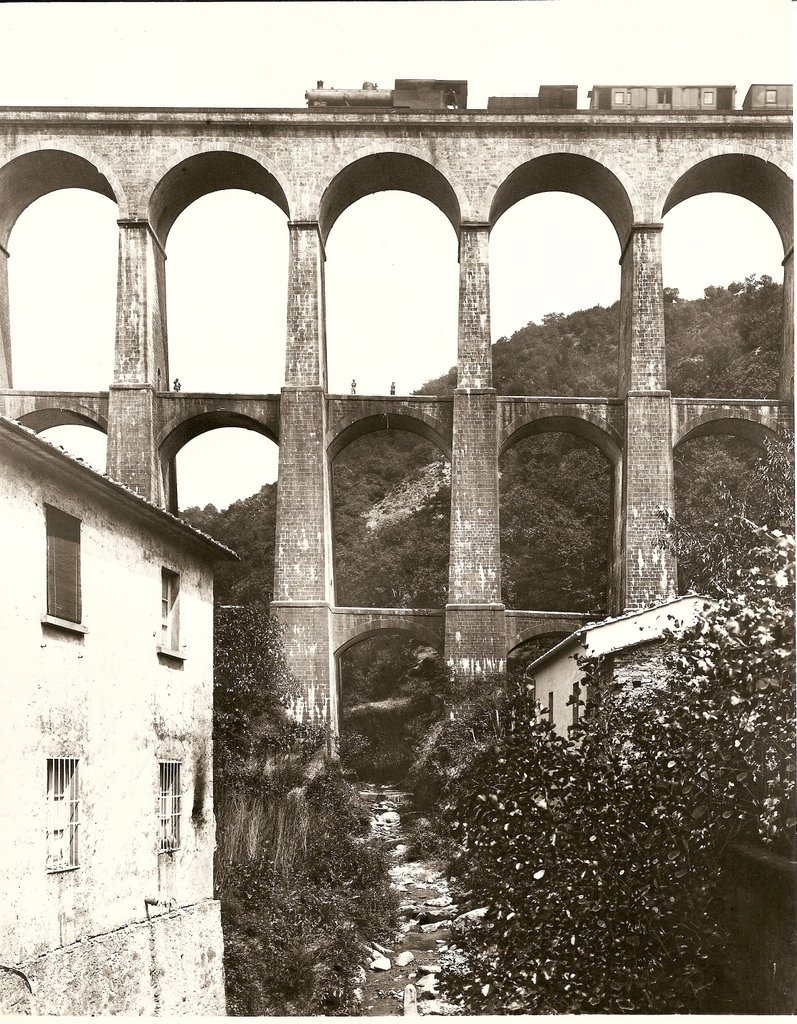
- Piteccio Viaduct prior to 1900

Overview
- Native name: Ferrovia Porrettana
- Status: in use
- Owner: RFI
- Locale: Emilia-Romagna and Tuscany, Italy
- Termini: Bologna; Pistoia

Service
- Type: Heavy rail
- Operator(s): Trenitalia

History
- Opened: 1864

Technical
- Line length: 99 km (62 mi)
- Track gauge: 1,435 mm (4 ft 8 1/2 in) standard gauge
- Electrification: 3 kV DC overhead line

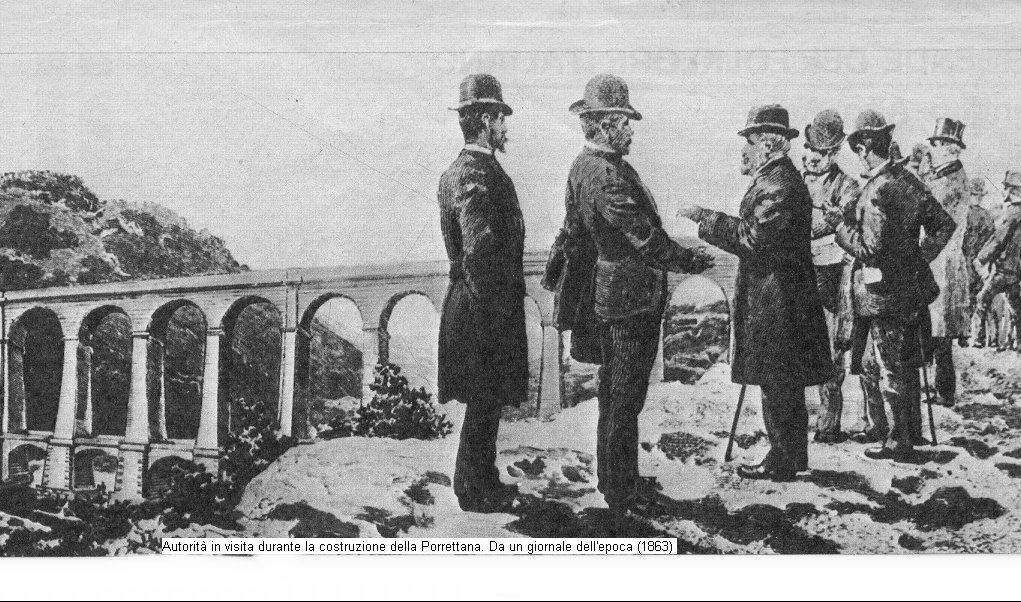
Officials visiting the construction of the Porrettana line in 1863

The Pistoia–Bologna railway is an Italian railway connecting Bologna to Pistoia and was the first line through the Apennines between Tuscany and Emilia-Romagna. It is also known in Italian as the Ferrovia Porrettana (Porrettana Railway, named after the spa town of Porretta Terme) or the Transappenninica ("trans-Apennines"). It was officially called the Strada ferrata dell'Italia Centrale (Central Italy Railway) and was officially inaugurated by King Victor Emmanuel II in 1864.

At the time it was an enormous engineering project with its 47 tunnels and 35 bridges and viaducts, with a total length of 99 km. The most difficult section was the 14 km stretch between Pracchia and Pistoia, which had a drop of 500 metres. The project was put in the charge of the French engineer Jean Louis Protche who solved the problem by designing a spiral tunnel between Piteccio and Corbezzi. This solution was then used for the construction of the Gotthard Tunnel. In Porretta Terme a square was dedicated to Protche and Victor Emmanuel II, who opened the line. It was electrified on the three-phase system (3,700 V at 16.7 Hz) in 1927 and re-electrified with 3,000 V DC in 1934.

== History ==
In the second half of nineteenth century the Grand Duchy of Tuscany had an extensive rail network that had grown to 225 km: the Leopolda railway between Florence, Pisa and Livorno, the Maria Antonia railway connecting Florence, Prato and Pistoia, the Pisa–Lucca railway and the Central Tuscany railway between Empoli and Siena. In this period construction began on the line from Pistoia to Lucca and studies for lines linking and Chiusi and Florence and Bologna through a pass over the Apennines to connect Florence with the north–south railways of Italy.

In 1845 Cini, an engineer of San Marcello Pistoiese and Ciardi an engineer of Prato, each presented project proposals for the crossing of the Apennines. The line proposed by Cini started from Pistoia, up the Ombrone at a gradient of up to 20 per thousand to the district of San Felice. From there it would climb the foothills of the Apennines for 16 km with grades of 12 to 25 per thousand and a 2,700 metre long tunnel through the mountains to Pracchia. From Pracchia to Bologna the line would follow the course of the Reno river. The proposed route would have been tortuous but Cini was mainly interested in promoting the interests of Pistoia by connecting Pracchia with Pistoia.

Ciardi challenged Cini's proposal and contended that a railway through the Apennines should be designed to be part of the Italian national rail network that was forming at the time and this meant making the carriage of freight cheaper and transport travelers heading north faster. To do this, the line should have low grades and be as short as possible between Florence and Bologna. Ciardi, abandoned his first proposal for a route across the Apennines along the valleys of the Bisenzio, Setta and Reno rivers, in places with grades over 12 per thousand. He proposed a second route with lower grades and 14 km shorter than the proposed Porrettana. The new route would pass through the Apennines at Gravigno, near Cantagallo at 480 meters above mean sea level with a 4 km long tunnel and a maximum gradient of 12 per thousand. This route was similar to the Bologna–Florence Direttissima route finally opened in 1934.

The prospect of a choice of routes that would lead to the increased importance for Pistoia or Prato triggered a competition between the two cities. Tilting the balance, however, was Austria’s military interest in a fast connection with the port of Livorno and its belief that Pistoia was a militarily strategic point. Austria therefore preferred Porrettana and lobbied Leopold II, Grand Duke of Tuscany who was obliged to support the Austrian interests. In 1849 Leopold II was restored to power by Austrian troops and they occupied Tuscany until 1855.

The first agreement on the railway was signed in Rome in 1851. The contract for the Porrettana line was concluded on 26 January 1852 in Modena. In the following years the Bologna–Pistoia railway was delayed by the argument between the supporters of the two routes. On 14 March 1856, an agreement was signed in Vienna between the Austrian Empire, the Duchy of Parma and Modena, The Grand Duchy of Tuscany and the Papal States for the construction of the Central Italian Railway (Italian: Strada Ferrata dell'Italia Centrale) from Piacenza to Pistoia, with a branch to Mantua and anticipating strategic links with the existing lines of Lombardy and Veneto and extensions to Rome. This was a strategic plan specifically intended to promote military interests.

=== Construction ===
In 1856 after a series of works had been carried out in a manner that was not consistent with the purpose of building the railway, the project was entrusted to a company with capital subscribed by French, English and Italian shareholders. It was directed by the French surveyor Jean Louis Protche, who oversaw the entire project and solved the problem of crossing the Apennines with a 2,727 metre long curved tunnel, often cited as an example of technique and daring and a prelude to the most famous application of spiral tunnels on the Gotthardbahn. The last stretch between Pracchia and Pistoia was inaugurated on 2 November 1864.

The building of the Porrettana line represented a major step forward, but it was soon clear it was already inadequate for its task. The completion of the work confirmed Ciardi's predictions that it would be long and expensive; it had 49 tunnels and grades of up to 26 per thousand. The total final cost was higher than that of the Fréjus line. Four years earlier, Austria had lost its hegemony over Italy, and therefore the military purposes for which the line had been intended had gone. Its use for the carriage of goods and passengers between north and south immediately showed that the line lacked capacity and had many other problems. Between Pistoia and Pracchia, among other things, the line was only able to handle 27 trains per day. A few years after its opening the best mountain climbing locomotives some could haul 160 tons over the line between Florence and Bologna in 3½ hours, but the line had a capacity of only 3,000 tons of freight each day. Initially the line was limited to two pairs of trains each day. The promotion of tourism in the mountains that Pistoia sought from the Porrettana line could not be achieved because of the increasing use of transit traffic for goods heading north and south did not allow the development of local passenger services, except at the spa town of Porretta Terme.

The line was absorbed by the Upper Italian Railways on its establishment on 1 July 1865. This was taken over by the Mediterranean Network on 1 July 1885.

The Porrettana railway is a single track line from Bologna to Pistoia, where it connected to the Pistoia–Prato–Florence line, a total of 131 km. The locomotive depot at Florence Santa Maria Novella station provided locomotives for the moderate climb to Pistoia, where an additional locomotive was attached to push trains up the section of maximum grade from Pistoia to Pracchia. The Apennines tunnel was very inconvenient for passengers and drivers because of the suffocating smoke of uphill trains that penetrated everywhere. Ventilation shafts and fans were installed subsequently, but did not solve the problem. In addition there were problems with braking on the grades and the weather also created difficulties. Despite the problems, traffic soon reached high levels. During World War I traffic reached its highest level, with 70 trains in 24 hours. Teams of drivers were stationed on horseback at the exit of the main tunnels, ready to jump on the trains as it crept up from Pistoia in order to take over from semi-asphyxiated drivers if necessary.

In 1927 finally came the move to three-phase electric traction (3,700V at 16.7 Hz). Due to its heavy traffic, the first experiment in Italy on centralized train dispatching began on the Porrettana line in 1927. Traffic on the line had reached its limit. Work had started on the Bologna–Florence line, known as the Direttissima, in 1913. On 22 April 1934 after much effort, it was finally opened to traffic, so the Porrettana line was relegated to handle local traffic only, with five pairs of trains each day.

During the retreat from the Gothic Line in World War II, the German army systematically destroyed structures, buildings and everything that could be useful to the enemy. Between Bologna and Pracchia 29 bridges, eight tunnels, 10 stations, 45 signal boxes and 52 km of track were blown up. It also crashed two locomotives loaded with explosives in the main tunnel. The line was rebuilt in record time and was reopened from Bologna to Pracchia on 5 October 1947 and between Pracchia and Pistoia on 29 May 1949. The line is still maintained only for local traffic.

=== Length and date of opening of individual sections ===
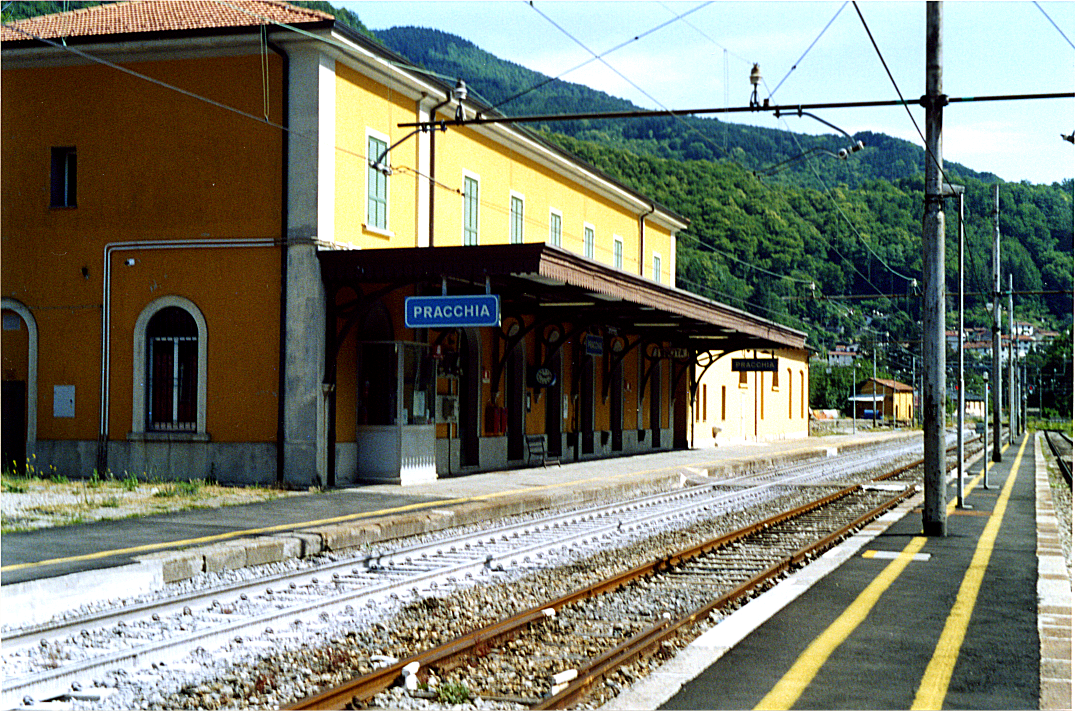
Pracchia station

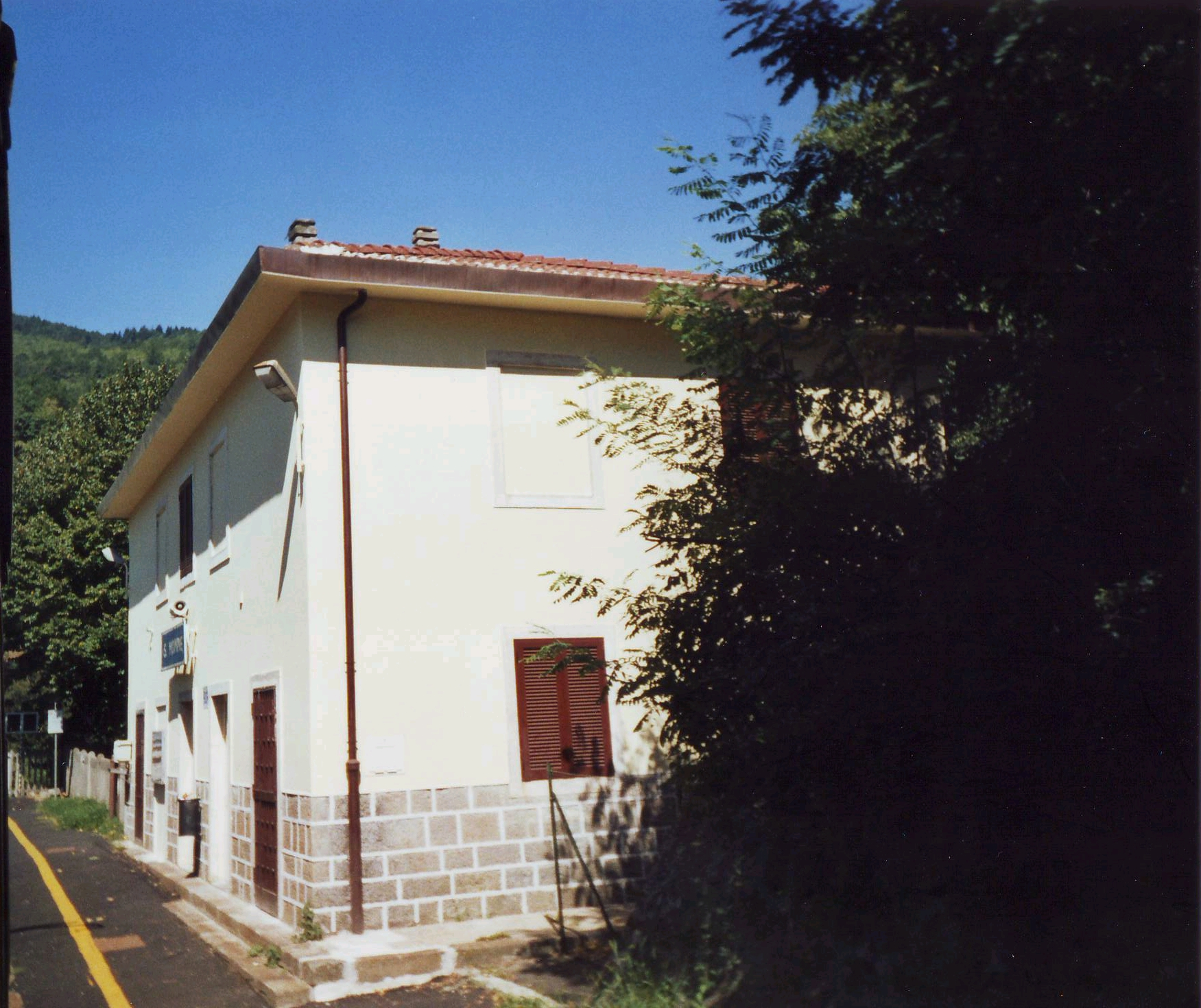
San Mommè station

- Bologna–Vergato, 39 km, 18 August 1862
- Vergato–Pracchia, 35 km, 1 December 1863
- Pracchia–Pistoia, 25 km, 2 November 1864

== Features ==
- Length: 99 km single track.
- Grades:
  - Pistoia–Pracchia section: average gradient of 22 per thousand, up 26 per thousand at Valdibrana station;
  - Pracchia–Porretta section: average gradient of 17 per thousand, up to 25 per thousand between Ponte della Venturina and Molino del Pallone;
  - Porretta–Bologna section: average gradient of 5 per thousand, up to 11 per thousand.
- Tunnels: 48 totaling 18.480 kilometres:
  - Vaioni tunnel, 533 metres, curve radius of 350 m,
  - Piteccio-Vignacce-Fabbian tunnel complex, 1,708 m radius curves 300 m;
  - Apennine tunnel 2,727 m with a gradient of 24.43 per thousand;
  - Casale tunnel 2,622 m
  - Riola tunnel 1,834 m.
- Bridges and viaducts: 64 with a total length of 2.240 km
- Level crossings: 29
- Stations: 13 attended and 3 unattended
- Electric traction, 3,000 V DC.
