= Pisa–Florence railway =

Railway line in Italy

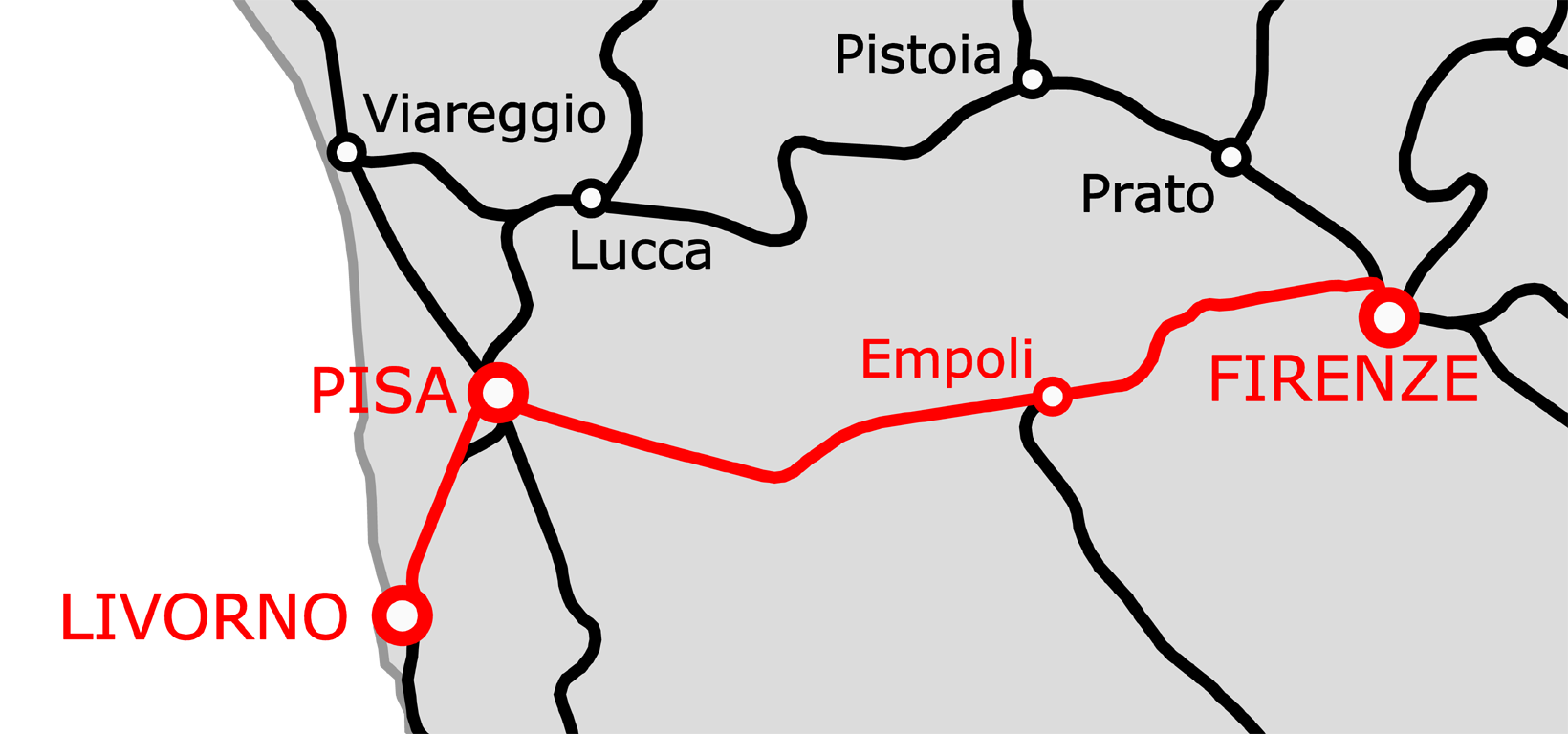

Overview
- Native name: Ferrovia Leopolda
- Status: Operational
- Owner: RFI
- Locale: Italy
- Termini: Firenze Santa Maria Novella; Livorno Centrale

Service
- Type: Heavy rail
- Operator: Trenitalia

History
- Opened: In stages from 1844 to 1848

Technical
- Line length: 101 km (63 mi)
- Number of tracks: 2
- Track gauge: 1,435 mm (4 ft 8 1/2 in)
- Electrification: 3000 V DC

The Pisa–Florence railway (formerly known in Italian as the Ferrovia Leopolda, "Leopolda railway") is a line built in the 1840s connecting the Tuscan cities of Florence, Pisa and Livorno, passing through Empoli and Pontedera. It is 101 km long and fully electrified at 3,000 V DC. Passenger traffic is managed by Trenitalia.

== History ==
=== Historical situation ===
Following its restoration of the Grand Duchy of Tuscany after the Congress of Vienna, it was led by the benevolent and efficient house of Lorraine. In 1824, upon the death of Ferdinand III, the government of the Grand Duchy passed to his son Leopold II (Italian: "Leopoldo"). The young king was tolerant of liberal ideas, an advocate for important public works and well disposed towards the new technology and private initiative. He approved proposals, formulated in March 1838 by the Florentine banker Emanuele Fenzi and the Swiss-born contractor Pierre Senn of Livorno, to build a railway between Florence and the Port of Livorno.

=== Project ===
After raising the necessary capital in 40 days, the two financiers established a technical committee of nine members headed by Count Luigi Serristori. On 5 July, two routes had been prepared to meet the business's needs, and were submitted for consideration by the English engineer Robert Stephenson, son of the pioneer of railways George Stephenson, who was then in charge of developing the project. Stephenson was persuaded to take part in the project by Orazio Hall, brother of Fenzi's wife, and Augustine Kotzian, former president of the Livorno Chamber of Commerce, who went to London to meet him in August 1838. Stephenson appointed his assistants William Hopper and William Bray to study the route on the ground. In due course Stephenson proposed a route which corresponded with the current line along the Arno valley; he presented the final draft on 30 April 1839. This proposal was finally adopted by Grand Duke Leopold II on 25 February 1840.

The 7 June 1841 the first meeting of the company was held with the election of the board of directors, which voted to adopt the name of Società Anonima per la Strada Ferrata Leopolda (Italian: Leopolda Railway Company) in honour of the king, hence the name Leopolda Railway.

=== Construction ===
Work started on a single track from Livorno to the port of Livorno. On 27 January 1844, the first trips were made between Pisa to Livorno with two test trains. The first consisting of the locomotive and a first-class train took about twenty invited guests from Pisa to Livorno in just a quarter of an hour. The second had three cars and with over two hundred guests and arrived in Livorno in 17 minutes. The official inauguration of the first stretch between Livorno and Pisa (12.3 km) occurred a few days later on 13 March and the next day it was opened to the public.

The line was a great success, both for goods and passengers, and led to the acceleration of construction. Pontedera was reached on 19 October 1845 (19.4 km), Empoli on 21 June 1847 (km 26.8) and the following year on 10 June 1848, the entire 97 km long line was opened to traffic from Livorno San Marco station to Leopolda station, just outside Florence's city walls at Porta al Prato. The locomotives, rails and infrastructure were all built by Stephenson's company, including the bridge over the Arno, which survived for almost 100 years.

The construction of the railway brought great economic benefits but it also had social implications. It was resisted physically by the local carters of Montelupo Fiorentino who saw it as threatening their work, which consisted of the transport of goods to and from Florence on barged on the Arno river.

=== Operations ===
In the spring of 1850 the doubling of the line was completed and in 1858 the Livorno port station was opened. The Leopolda station in Florence was short-lived, at least for passenger service: on 24 April 1860 a link was opened between the Leopolda railway and the Maria Antonia railway leading to the Maria Antonia station near the current Florence main station. Later, with the construction of the Livorno–Rome railway and the opening of the new Livorno Centrale railway station in 1910, the San Marco station was greatly reduced in importance.

The first genuinely commercially viable Italian railway remained unchanged outside the urban areas of Florence and Livorno until 2006, when a deviation of about 9.5 km between Montelupo Fiorentino and San Donnino was opened to avoid the tortuous (but very scenic when viewed from above) route near the narrow section of Arno valley (known as the Gonfolina). The deviation was authorised in 1995 after a decade of discussion.

== Services ==
Trenitalia, in collaboration with the Tuscany region, activated from 1 February 2009 a regional service with a regular interval timetable connecting Firenze Porta al Prato railway station with the rural area west of Florence and Empoli. This service takes 30 minutes operates 15 times each way per day, with a frequency of about one hour between each train. The full distance takes about 31 minutes.

The Pisa Centrale–Pisa Airport services was unofficially closed in 2013 and officially closed under territorial circular FI 08/2014 of 6 October 2014 so that it could be replaced by the new Pisa Mover system built by the Leitner company. Previously it was served by regional trains every thirty minutes, except for a break in the morning to allow maintenance on the line, and by some pairs of services, always regional, running from Florence Santa Maria Novella, which were also closed or now terminate at Pisa Centrale.

In addition to regional trains, the line is also served by Frecciargento trains operated with ETR 485 sets and Frecciabianca trains operated with ETR 460 sets, running on the Genoa–Pisa–Florence–Rome route.

== See also ==
- List of railway lines in Italy
