= Bologna–Florence railway =

Key north central Italian transport link

Overview
- Other name: La Direttissima
- Native name: Linea ferroviaria Bologna–Firenze
- Status: Operational
- Owner: RFI
- Locale: Italy
- Termini: Bologna Centrale railway station; Florence

Service
- Type: Heavy rail

History
- Opened: 1934

Technical
- Line length: 97 km (60 mi)
- Track gauge: 1,435 mm (4 ft 8 1/2 in) standard gauge
- Electrification: 3 kV DC overhead line

The Bologna–Florence railway is one of the major links in the Italian rail network, connecting the railways of the Po Valley with the railways of Tuscany and central Italy under the Apennines. It is also known as the Bologna–Florence direttissima—"direttissima" is Italian for "most direct". It was Italy's greatest engineering achievement in the first half of the twentieth century. When it opened in 1934 it significantly shortened the old winding Porrettana line over the Apennines via Pistoia, and was made possible by the 18.5 km-long Apennine Base Tunnel. The new Bologna–Florence high-speed railway was opened on 5 December 2009; it includes 73.8 km of tunnels in its 78.5 km length.

== History ==
The Porrettana line was opened across the Apennines between Bologna and Florence via Pistoia and Prato in November 1864 to connect the trunk railway of the Po Valley (the Milan–Bologna and the Bologna–Ancona railways, completed in 1861) with the railways of Tuscany. Florence was finally connected by rail with Rome via Perugia in 1866. The Porrettana line was immediately successful but while it was a significant engineering achievement it soon became clear that it was inadequate to cater for the traffic attempting to use it. In particular, it was a single track line, with steep gradients and its Apennine tunnel was built on a steep slope causing climbing steam trains to generate suffocating smoke, even when extra ventilation shafts and fans were eventually installed.

Various projects for additional crossings of the Apennines were developed, and the Pontremolese line was opened in 1892 between La Spezia and Parma providing an alternative route from Rome to Milan. The Faentina line was opened in 1893 from Florence to Faenza as another alternative route. However these lines suffered from the same basic problem: they were mountain lines consisting of a single, winding track and were subject to being obstructed by snow in winter. As time passed, traffic increased, but so did technical expertise in drilling long tunnels, so it became possible to envisage more direct routes with reduced climbs up a pass.

In 1882 the designer of Porrettana, Jean Louis Protche, was commissioned by several institutions to examine a number of projects including one dating back to 1871, proposed by the engineer Antonio Zannoni which proposed a more easterly route for the new line in order to reduce the length of climb. Protche chose a slightly different route through the valleys of the Setta and Bisenzio rivers, connecting with the existing line in Prato, and passing under the Apennines through an 18,032 m tunnel; its approach line would have had a total vertical climb of 328 m at a maximum slope of 12 per thousand.

In 1902, the Colombo Commission was established to study the proposals of Protche and Zannoni along with those of several other engineers, Sugliano, De Gaetani, Naldoni and Mercanti. In 1908 the government authorised for a budget of 150 million lire for final studies for the project and its construction. The approval of the final route of the Direttissima, however, continued to be debated until 1911. The project was then approved for a double track line using electric traction, widely spaced stations, 31 tunnels—which alone constitute 37% of the line—and numerous bridges.

=== Construction ===
Construction lasted from 1913 to 1934, slowed by World War I, economic and political crises and the complexity of the work. The work also often had to be carried out on unstable land and the tunnels had to be built largely through clay and sand schists, which are poor soils for tunnelling due to the instability of the schist and the tendency of clay to swell. Before 18.5 km-long Apennine Tunnel construction could be commenced two temporary 950 mm (3 ft 1 3/8 in) gauge construction railways had to be built from Sasso Marconi up the Setta Valley to the northern tunnel entrance and from Parato up the Bisenzio Valley to the southern tunnel entrance. An aerial rope way was also built from the northern entrance to carry construction material to a work site built at Cà di Landino above the centre of the tunnel in the town of Castiglione dei Pepoli; Cà di Landino was connected to work sites in the Apennine Tunnel by two additional tunnels (both over 500 metres long) built at an angle of 27 degree. These preliminary works were completed in 1920 and construction of Apennine Tunnel then commenced, taking another 11 years to be completed. These works were affected by methane gas leaks, which were generally dealt with by controlled explosions, with only four causing serious interruption to the work. On the other hand, a fire set off by blasting led to a serious fire in the wooden timbering used to shore up the tunnel temporarily, which burnt for two and a half months, before it was flooded with water. It took another four and a half months to repair the tunnel, during which the work continued beyond the burnt section, accessed by a by-pass tunnel.

97 workers died during the construction of the railway, in particular in the central tunnel, and many of the survivors were afflicted by silicosis. On the other hand, it revived poor mountain villages whose inhabitants might otherwise have been forced to emigrate. On 22 April 1934 the line finally opened to traffic and revolutionised Italy's transport system, just as the Porrettana railway had done 70 years before.

== The new line ==
The line was built as a "modern" line, with double track, electric traction, and large-radius curves with good transitions. Compared to the Porrettana line the route was shortened from 131 to 97 kilometres; its maximum slope was 1.2 percent compared to 2.6 percent on the old line. The total ascent and descent on the line was reduced from 616 metres on the Porrettana line to 322 metres on the line. The new line's maximum speed was 180 km/h compared to 75 km/h on the old line.

The minimum time between Bologna and Florence was five hours when the Porrettana line opened in 1864, but had been reduced to three hours after World War I and to 2½ hours in 1927 when the Porrettana line was electrified. Express trains on the new line took 75 minutes when it opened; today, the fastest trains take 55 minutes.

With the opening in 2009 of the high-speed line next to the direttissima, which is almost entirely in tunnel and which further reduced the travel time to as little as 37 minutes, the line has lost its leading role in connecting Bologna and Florence, although it remains an important link between Bologna and Prato. The line also carries out an important service for the municipalities of the Setta and Savena valleys as part of the Servizio Ferroviario Metropolitano di Bologna (Bologna Metropolitan Railway Service) project. As part of this project, the station of Bologna Mazzini was opened on 9 June the 2013.

=== Apennine Tunnel ===
The Apennine Tunnel was the second longest in the world, only 1300 metres less than the Simplon and it is still in the top 20 in the world. It still has an underground station, which is very unusual on a non-urban railway, called Precedenze (Way) station, but it became disused in the 1960s for security reasons and due to lack of traffic. It was intended primarily to allow the overtaking of slow goods trains and had two lines over 450 metres long dug parallel to the main tunnel. It was also used for local passenger traffic, being connected with the outside world by a tunnel built at the angle of 50 degrees, with about a thousand steps, which emerged in Cà di Landino, which continued as a small village after the completion of the tunnel. The station is currently used to switch trains between tracks and is called Posto Movimento Precedenze. Two underground stations are also sometimes used in the Seikan Tunnel (54 km), and a station was formerly proposed to be built in the Gotthard Base Tunnel (54 km) near Sedrun.

== Terrorist attacks ==
On the line there have been two terrorist attacks, in 1974 the Italicus Express bombing and in 1984 the Train 904 bombing.

== See also ==
- Caduti della Direttissima
- List of railway lines in Italy
