= Firenze Santa Maria Novella railway station =

Railway station in Florence, Italy

Firenze Santa Maria Novella
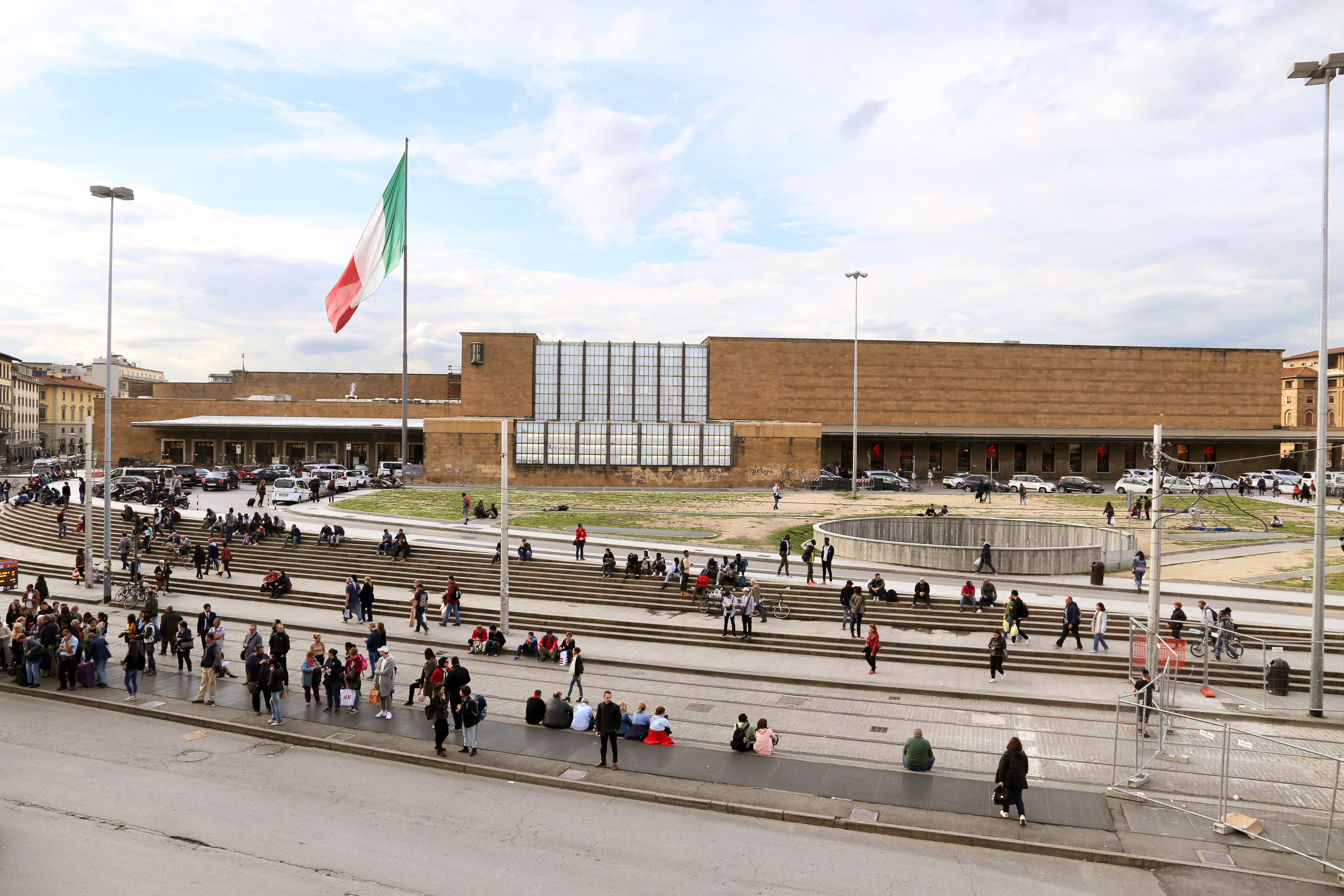
- View of the station building.

General information
- Location: Piazza della Stazione; 50123 Florence; Italy
- Coordinates: 43°46′34″N 11°14′53″E
- Owner: Rete Ferroviaria Italiana
- Operator: Grandi Stazioni
- Lines: Bologna–Florence (high speed); Bologna–Florence (traditional); Florence–Rome (high speed); Florence–Rome (traditional); Viareggio–Florence; Florence–Pisa–Livorno; Florence–Faenza
- Distance: 314.077 kilometres (195.158 mi) from Roma Termini
- Platforms: 15

Construction
- Architect: Gruppo Toscano

Other information
- IATA code: ZMS

History
- Opened: 1848
- Rebuilt: 1934
Location
- Location within Tuscany Location within Italy

Firenze Santa Maria Novella (in English Florence Santa Maria Novella) or Stazione di Santa Maria Novella (IATA: ZMS) is the main railway station in Florence, Italy. The station is used by 59 million people every year and is one of the busiest in Italy.

It is at the northern end of the Florence–Rome high-speed railway line Direttissima, which was completed on 26 May 1992 and the southern end of the Bologna–Florence railway line, opened on 22 April 1934. A new high speed line to Bologna opened on 13 December 2009. The station is also used by regional trains on lines connecting to: Pisa, Livorno (Leopolda railway); Lucca, Viareggio (Viareggio–Florence railway); Bologna (Bologna–Florence railway) and Faenza (Faentina railway).

== History ==
The station was inaugurated on 3 February 1848 to serve the railway to Pistoia and Pisa, and was initially called Maria Antonia (from the name of the railway, named in honour of Princess Maria Antonia of the Two Sicilies); it was much closer to the Santa Maria Novella church than the current station. It was renamed after the church after the unification of Italy.

The Florentine sculptor Romano Romanelli publicly attacked the original proposals by government architect Mazzoni in editorials in the city's main daily newspaper, La Nazione. A constructive debate resulted in the project being sponsored by the architect Marcello Piacentini and designed by Gruppo Toscano in 1932.

The Gruppo Toscano included Giovanni Michelucci, Italo Gamberini, Pier Niccolò Berardi, Nello Baroni, Sarre Guarnieri, and Leonardo Lusanna.

The building was constructed between 1932 and 1934. The plan of the building, as seen from above, looks as if it were based on the fascio littorio, the symbol of Benito Mussolini's National Fascist Party, many documents give this explanation, but, that shape was forced by the pre-existing station. The "blade" represented by the first two-passenger tracks and the postal ones were in fact the extension of the 1861 alignment which included the tracks of the line from Livorno.

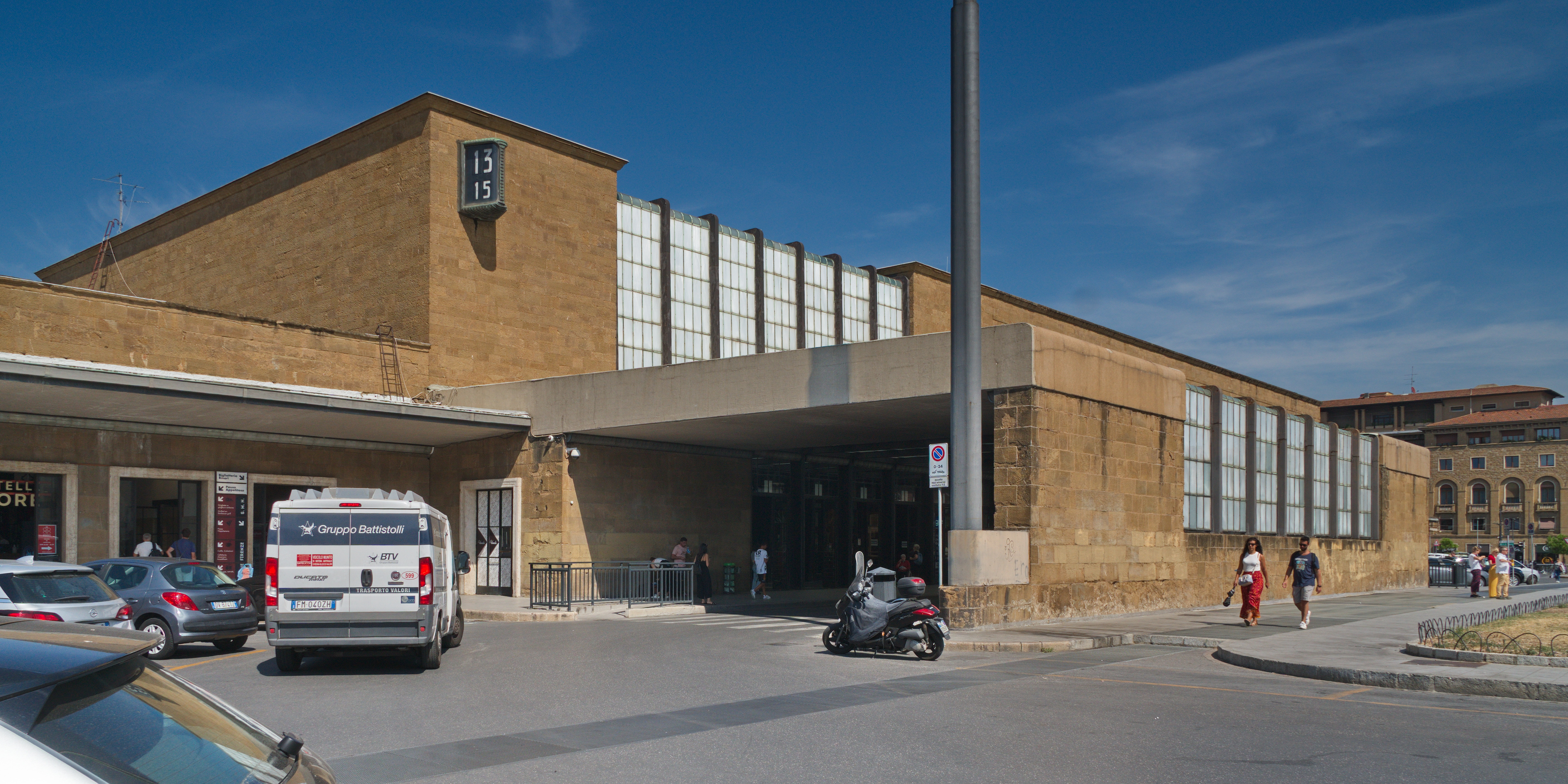
Santa Maria Novella railway station, main entrance on the south east side facing the city centre opposite the choir of Santa Maria Novella

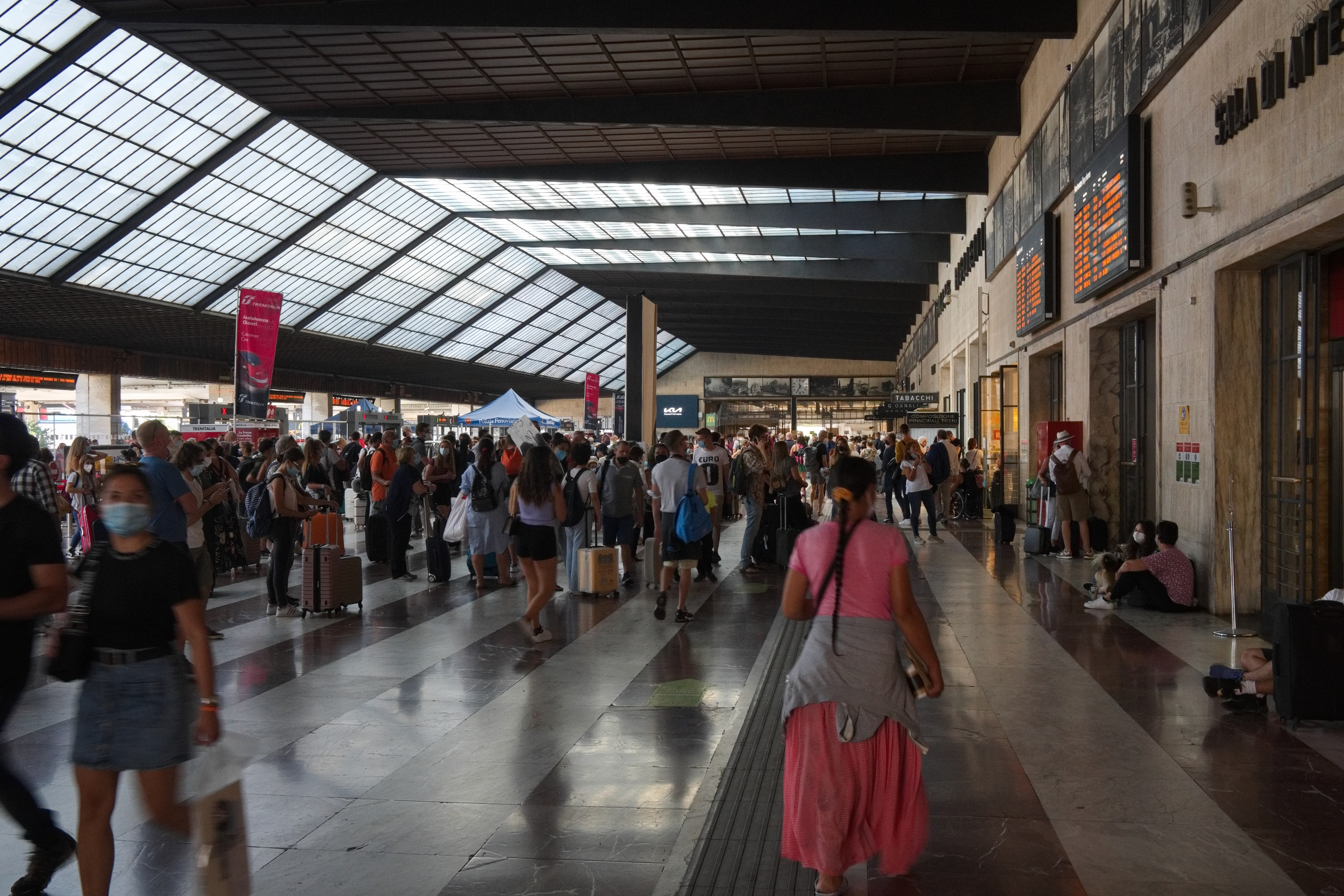
Railway station interior, concourse of the terminus with entrance to the tracks on the left.

The building is a prime example of Italian modernism, but has little to do with the Italian Rationalism movement, being more strongly influenced by the Viennese architecture of Loos and Hoffmann, with perhaps a nod to Wright; but it is the building's complete originality that makes it outstanding. The competition to design the station was controversial but the approval by Mussolini of the Gruppo Toscano project was hailed as an official acceptance of modernity. The station was designed to replace the aging Maria Antonia Station, one of the few example of architecture by I. K. Brunel in Italy, and to serve as a gateway to the city centre.

The Gruppo Toscano was only responsible for the main frontal building of the station. The heating plant and control tower, platforms, other facilities and details such as benches and baggage shelves were all designed in a contrasting style by the official Ministry of Communications architect, Angiolo Mazzoni. Outside and adjacent to the station is also Michelucci's white marble Palazzina Reale di Santa Maria Novella, built to host the royal family on visits to Florence.

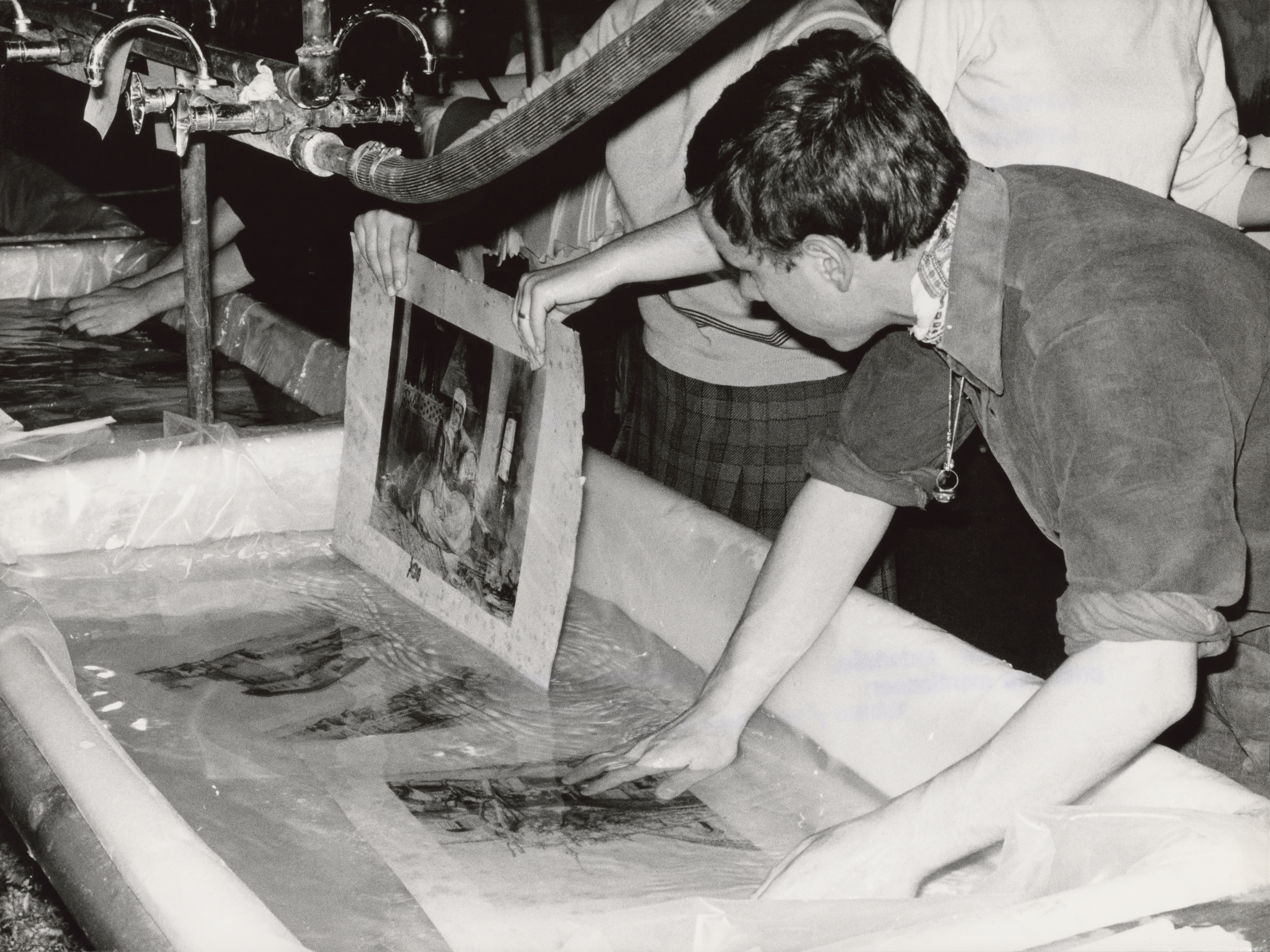
Manuscripts from the National Central Library being washed and dried in the station's boiler room after the 1966 flood of the Arno

While it is of a "uncompromisingly modern" design, the use of pietra forte (a hard sandstone) for the station's stone frontage was intended to respond to and contrast with the nearby Gothic architecture of the church of Santa Maria Novella. The interior of the station features a dramatic metal and glass roof with large skylights over the main passenger concourse, which is aligned perpendicular to the tracks and acts as a pedestrian street. The skylights span the passenger concourse without any supporting columns, giving a feeling of openness and vast space and reinforcing the convergence of all the public functions of the station on the passenger concourse.

Near platform #16 there is a statue and a memorial plaque in remembrance of the train loads of Jewish people who were deported from Italy to Nazi concentration camps during World War II.

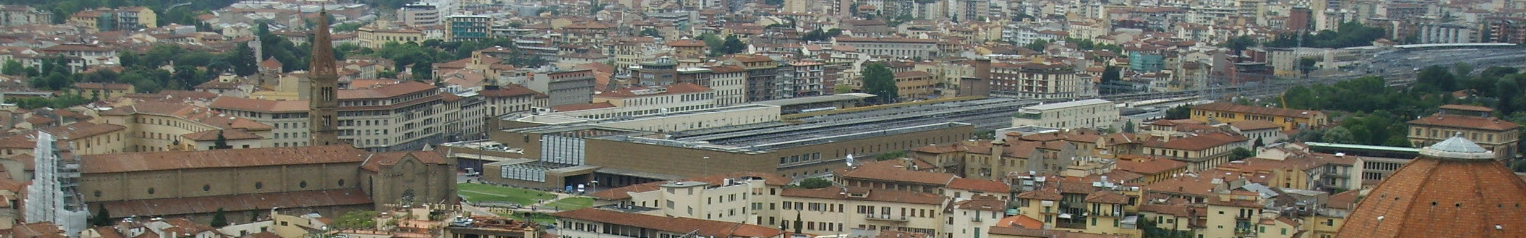
View from Giotto's Campanile of the station, with the control tower behind, Santa Maria Novella in the centre, and the dome of San Lorenzo in the right foreground

== Train services ==
The station is served by the following trains:

- High speed trains (Frecciarossa) Turin – Milan – Bologna – Florence – Rome – Naples – Salerno
- High speed trains (Frecciarossa) Venice – Padua – Bologna – Florence – Rome – Naples – Salerno
- High speed trains (Frecciargento) Trieste – Venice – Padua – Bologna – Florence – Rome
- High speed trains (Frecciargento) Udine – Treviso – Venice – Padua – Bologna – Florence – Rome
- High speed trains (Frecciargento) Venice – Padua – Bologna – Florence – Rome
- High speed trains (Frecciargento) Venice – Padua – Bologna – Florence – Rome – Fiumicino Airport

== See also ==
- Firenze Campo di Marte railway station
- Firenze Rifredi railway station
- History of rail transport in Italy
- List of railway stations in Tuscany
- Rail transport in Italy
- Railway stations in Italy
