= List of Italian rolling stock =

List of Italian rolling stock. The following list includes rolling stock that works, or has worked, on the Italian national railway network Ferrovie dello Stato Italiane and on private lines and lines in concession. The list is not exhaustive and additions are welcome.

== Railways ==
The history of Italian railways may be divided into three periods:

- Pre-1885, small railways were built, some privately owned and some state owned
- 1885–1905, the creation of the "great networks"
- 1905, nationalization

Abbreviations

- FAS = Ferrovia Alessandria–Stradella
- FS = Ferrovie dello Stato, Italian State Railways, established 1905
- LVCI = Imperial-regia società privilegiata delle strade ferrate lombardo-venete e dell'Italia Centrale
- RA = Rete Adriatica, Adriatic Network, 1885–1905
- RM = Rete Mediterranea, Mediterranean Network, 1885–1905
- SB = Südbahn, Southern Railway (Austria)
- SFAI = Società per le strade ferrate dell'Alta Italia, Upper Italian Railways, 1865 to 1885
- SFCS = Società per le Strade Ferrate Calabro-Sicule
- SFM = Società per le Strade Ferrate Meridionali, 1862–1885
- SFR = Società per le Strade Ferrate Romane, 1865–1885
- SFSP = Strade Ferrate dello Stato Piemontese
- SV = Società Veneta
- VER = Victor Emmanuel Railway, 1853–1867, later SFCS

== Locomotives ==
=== Rete Adriatica ===
Listed in order of Rete Adriatica (RA) number

FS	RA no.	Earlier nos.	Earlier nos.	Units	Date introduced	Wheels	Notes
FS Class 100	RA 1-26	In range SFM 1-34	-	26	1863	2-2-2	
FS Class 102	RA 31-52	In range SFAI 31–90	In range LVCI 1-50, 155-164	22	1857	2-2-2	
Scrapped before 1905	RA 1101-1111	SFAI 301-311	-	11	1877	2-4-0	
FS Class 552	RA 1865–1900	-	-	36	1890	4-4-0	

=== Rete Mediterranea ===
Listed in order of Rete Mediterranea (RM) number

FS	RM no.	Earlier nos.	Earlier nos.	Units	Date introduced	Wheels	Notes
FS Class 100	RM 7-14	In range SFM 1-34	-	8	1863	2-2-2	
FS Class 102	RM 501–518	In range SFAI 31–90	In range LVCI 1-50, 155-164	18	1857	2-2-2	
FS Class 103	in range RM 519-538	SFAI 91-105	SFSP 34–38 and 80-89	15	1853	2-2-2	
FS Class 103	in range RM 519-538	SFAI 106-110	-	5	1864	2-2-2	
FS Class 170	RM 1501-1573	SFAI	-	73	1873	2-4-0	
FS 1181-1182	RM 2019-2020	SFAI 381-382	LVCI 79-90	2	1858	2-4-0	10 units to Südbahn
FS Class 111	in range RM 2707-2715	SFAI 250-255	SFSP 99-104	6	1855	0-4-2	
FS Class 111	in range RM 2707-2715	SFAI 256-258	VER	3	1860	0-4-2	
FS Class 113	in range RM 2733–2773	in range SFAI 210–238	SFSP 1–8	8	1854	0-4-2	
FS Class 113	in range RM 2733–2773	in range SFAI 210–238	FAS 10–13	4	1857	0-4-2	
FS Class 113	in range RM 2733–2773	-	SFCS 1-10	10	1863	0-4-2	
FS Class 113	in range RM 2733–2773	in range SFAI 210–238	-	18	?	0-4-2	

=== Südbahn ===
FS	SB no.	Earlier nos.	Earlier nos.	Units	Date introduced	Wheels	Notes
FS Class 122	In range 18.467-18.499	-	-	32	1869	2-4-0	
FS Class 193	SB Class 29	SB Class 23	-	26	1860	0-6-0	
