= Class 53 =

Class 53 or 53 class may refer to:

- British Rail Class 53
- DRB Class 53, a planned, but not completed, oversize, German war locomotive (Kriegslokomotive)
- DRG Class 53, a class of German freight locomotives with a 0-6-0 wheel arrangement operated by the Deutsche Reichsbahn, with the following sub-classes:
  - Class 53.0: Prussian G 4.2
  - Class 53.3: Prussian G 4.3
  - Class 53.6-7: Saxon V V
  - Class 53.8: Württemberg Fc
  - Class 53.10: Oldenburg G 4.2
  - Class 53.70-71: Prussian G 3, PKP Class Th1
  - Class 53.70^{II}: BLE G 4.2
  - Class 53.71^{II}: BBÖ 47, BBÖ 49, BBÖ 58, BBÖ 56, JDŽ 124
  - Class 53.72: BBÖ 59, PKP-Class Th24
  - Class 53.73: EWA IIIc
  - Class 53.74: ČSD Class 322.4
  - Class 53.75: ČSD Class 324.3
  - Class 53.76: Prussian G 4.1
  - Class 53.76^{II}: ČSD Class 334.3
  - Class 53 7607^{II}: GWR 2301 Class
  - Class 53.77: PKP Class Th3, PKP Class Th4
  - Class 53.78: EWA IIb
  - Class 53.80-81: Bavarian C IV
  - Class 53.82: Saxon V
  - Class 53.83: Württemberg F
  - Class 53.85: Baden VIIa
  - Class 53.85: Baden VIIc
- New South Wales 53 class locomotive

See also

- DRB Class 50: The Deutsche Bundesbahn grouped 77 of these locomotives into Class 053 in 1968.
