= Locomotives SFM 1-34 =

SFM 1-34 later RA 1-26 / RM 7-14 later FS Class 100
Type and origin
- Power type: Steam
- Builder: Cail and Pietrarsa
- Build date: 1863–1867
- Total produced: 34
Specifications
- Configuration
  - Whyte: 2-2-2
- Gauge: 1,435 mm (4 ft 8 1/2 in)
- Leading dia.: 1.32 m (52 in)
- Driver dia.: 1.92 m (76 in)
- Fuel type: Coal
- Boiler pressure: 8 atmospheres
- Cylinders: 2
- Cylinder size: 400 mm × 600 mm (16 in × 24 in)

Locomotives SFM 1-34 refers to a class of 2-2-2 steam locomotives of the Società Italiana per le Strade Ferrate Meridionali (SFM). They were designed for hauling fast passenger trains.

== History ==
The locomotives, numbered from 1 to 34, were ordered by SFM from Cail of Paris and Officine di Pietrarsa to work on the lightly-graded lines Bologna - Ancona and Ancona - Bari.

In 1885, with the creation of the great national networks, the series was divided between Rete Adriatica (the Adriatic Network - RA), which obtained units 1 to 26, and Rete Mediterranea (the Mediterranean Network - RM), which obtained units 27 to 34 and renumbered them 7 to 14.

In 1905, with the establishment of the Ferrovie dello Stato (FS), 12 units were still in operation. FS classified them as Class 100 with numbers 1001–1012. After a few years they were withdrawn and scrapped.
