= 420 class =

420 class or Class 420 may refer to:

- DB Class 420, electric multiple units
- FS Class 420, 0-8-0 steam locomotives
- NBR 420 Class, 4-4-0 steam locomotives
