= 170 =

170 may refer to:

- 170 (number), the natural number following 169 and preceding 171
- 170 BC
- AD 170
- 170 (Infrastructure Support) Engineer Group
- Thalaivar 170
- Interstate 170
- Cessna 170
- UFC 170
- 170 Maria
- Radical 170

== See also ==
- Class 170 (disambiguation)
