= Prussian G 4.2 =

Class of 780 German 0-6-0 locomotives

Prussian G 4.2 DRG class 53.0 FS 272 PKP Th3
Type and origin
- Builder: Henschel & Sohn; Berliner Maschinenbau; Borsig; Grafenstaden; Hanomag; Hohenzollern; Schichau-Werke; Union Giesserei Königsberg; AG Vulcan Stettin
- Build date: 1882–1903
- Total produced: 780
Specifications
- Driver dia.: 1,340 mm (4 ft 4 3/4 in)
- Length
  - Over beams: 15,362 mm (50 ft 4 3/4 in)
- Axle load: 14.8 t (14.6 long tons; 16.3 short tons)
- Adhesive weight: 41.2 t (40.5 long tons; 45.4 short tons)
- Service weight: 41.2 t (40.5 long tons; 45.4 short tons)
- Water cap.: 10.5 or 12.0 m^{3} (10,500 or 12,000 L; 2,300 or 2,600 imp gal; 2,800 or 3,200 US gal)
- Boiler pressure: 12 kp/cm^{2} (1.18 MPa; 171 lbf/in^{2})
- Heating surface
  - Firebox: 1.53 m^{2} (16.5 sq ft)
  - Evaporative: 116.00 m^{2} (1,248.6 sq ft)
- Cylinders: 2
- High-pressure cylinder: 460 mm (18 1/8 in)
- Low-pressure cylinder: 650 mm (25 9/16 in)
- Piston stroke: 630 mm (24 13/16 in)
- Valve gear: Allan
Performance figures
- Maximum speed: 55 km/h (34 mph)
Career
- Numbers: DRG 53 001 – 53 025, 53 7001 – 53 7004; 53 7701 – 53 7706
- Retired: 1930

The Prussian G 4.2 was a class of compound 0-6-0 goods locomotive of the Prussian State Railways. It was a compound version of the G 3 and G 4.1 types by Henschel.

== History ==
In 1882 the first two prototypes were built by Henschel; but it was 1885 before series production commenced. Production continued until 1899, but in 1903 there was an order for the East Prussian Southern Railway (Ostpreußische Südbahn, OS). A total of 780 locomotives of this type were delivered to Prussian railways. The compound locomotives proved to be more economical and more powerful than the two-cylinder-simple locomotives. The G 4.2 was used in freight train service on longer routes.

After the end of World War I, six G 4.2 went to Italy (as FS 272.005–010) as reparations. The Polish State Railways also received locomotives of this type and classified them as Th3.

In 1920, The Deutsche Reichsbahn reallocated a G 4.2 to the Schwerin Division, where it was renumbered 406 in the Grand Duchy of Mecklenburg Friedrich-Franz Railway list. In the 1923 DRG renumbering plan, 296 locomotives were included as 53 001 to 53 295 and 53 451 (the Schwerin Division loco). In the final 1925 renumbering plan, only 53 001 to 53 024 were left. The 53 025 was a former G 4.2 of the Imperial Railways in Alsace-Lorraine (Reichseisenbahnen in Elsaß-Lothringen, EL). All had been retired by 1930. With the nationalisation of the Brunswick State Railway Company (Braunschweigischen Landes-Eisenbahn, BLE), on 1 January 1938, four G 4.2 locomotives were added to the Reichsbahn fleet as 53 7001 to 53 7004 (second). During World War Two, six Polish Th3 locomotives were added as 53 7701 to 53 7706.

The locomotives were coupled to pr 3 T 10.5 or pr 3 T 12 tenders.

Other railways that also had G 4.2 locomotives:

- East Prussian Southern Railway: four locomotives from 1903, taken over by the Prussian State Railways in the same year;
- Werrabahn: five locomotives from 1893 and 1894, taken over by the Prussian State Railways in 1895;
- Royal Prussian Military Railway (Königlich Preussische Militär-Eisenbahn, KPME): one locomotive from 1899, transferred to the Prussian State Railways in 1919;
- Lübeck-Büchen Railway Company (Lübeck-Büchener Eisenbahn, LBE): Two locomotives from 1896, classified as LBE G 3, retired in 1923;
- Grand Duchy of Oldenburg State Railways (Großherzoglich Oldenburgische Staatseisenbahnen, GOE): 27 locomotives, see Oldenburg G 4.2;
- Imperial Railways in Alsace-Lorraine: 57 locomotives of classes C28 and C30, as well as 36 similar locomotives of classes C25, C26 and C27, siehe Alsace-Lorraine G 4.

== Design ==
Despite the production of Diagram (Musterblatt) III 3a, there were differences between locomotives. A different number of boiler tubes would give a different heating surface. The steam dome could be found on the first, second or third course of the boiler. Earlier locomotives had rivetted counterweights, on later examples they were cast. Some locomotives had von Borries types starting valves, other had the Dultz type.

== G 4.2 on the Mecklenburg Friedrich-Franz-Railway ==
Increasing freight traffic at the turn of the century made it necessary for the Grand Duchy of Mecklenburg Friedrich-Franz Railway (Großherzogliche Mecklenburgische Friedrich-Franz-Eisenbahn, MFFE) to purchase new locomotives. Between 1901 and 1905 the MFFE bought five copies of the Prussian G 4.2 and classified them as Mecklenburg X (ten), and numbered them 401 to 405. Four of the locomotives came from Henschel & Sohn, and the fifth from Linke-Hofmann. In 1920 the Deutsche Reichsbahn transferred an additional locomotive, Berlin 3801 to Mecklenburg and renumbered it 406. In the 1923 Reichsbahn renumbering plan they were to be renumbered 53 401 to 53 405 and 53 451; however they were all renumbered by 1925.

== G 4.2 on the Marburger Kreisbahn ==
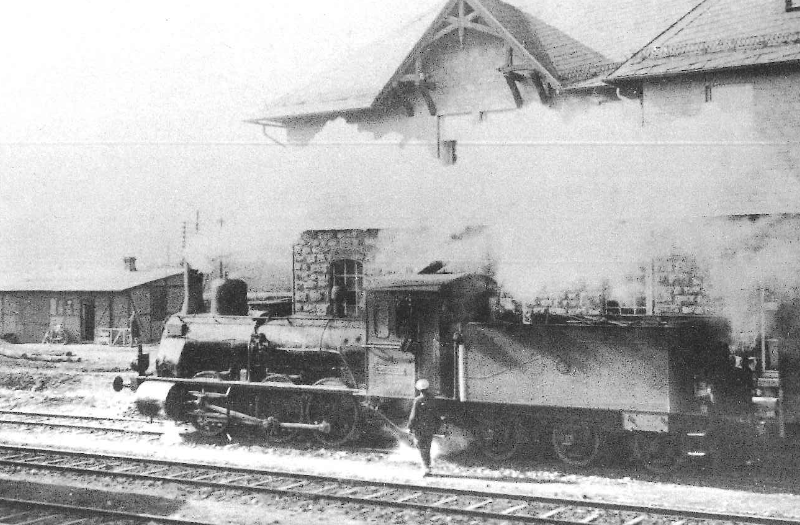
Marburger Kreisbahn 3 (3rd) in Bahnhof Marburg Süd Krbf (1926)

A G 4.2 locomotive was acquired by the Marburger Kreisbahn. The locomotive had been built by Schichau-Werke in 1892 (serial number 614) as Erfurt Division 1315; it had been transferred to the Halle Division in 1895, and been renumbered 1014 in 1901.

A tender with a water capacity of 10 m^{3} (10,000 L; 2,200 imp gal; 2,600 US gal) had to be found. The loco had some differences: it had a high-pressure cylinder bore of 480 mm (18 7/8 in) and a low-pressure bore of 680 mm (26 3/4 in), the driving wheel diameter was 1,200 mm (3 ft 11 1/4 in) and the wheelbase was 3,400 mm (11 ft 1 3/4 in). With the new tender the length over buffers was 15,362 mm (50 ft 4 3/4 in). It had inside Allan valve gear and slide valves.

After major repairs, it entered service at the end of 1914, now numbered 3 (the third locomotive to carry that number on the Marburger Kreisbahn). It was the MK's only tender locomotive, and as there were no turntables on the route, it had to bee driven backwards from Dreihausen.

Initially the locomotive only had a handbrake on the tender, which led to problems when trains were heavy and the tender was almost empty. Although the locomotive was fitted with a rear cab wall and Westinghouse brakes after World War I, it remained unpopular with crews. The cab doorway was very narrow, and the Schichau-type starting valve worked unreliably.

After a rebuilt, the locomotive continued to be unreliable – the crews nicknamed it the stubborn goat (störrischer Bock). It was still a compound locomotive in 1926, but may have been converted to simple-expansion locomotive.

It was withdrawn in 1934, and sold for scrap the same year to a company in Marburg; it was scrapped in Marbug South station.

== Brunswick State Railway ==
Five locomotiven were sold to the Brunswick State Railway Company (Braunschweigische Landes-Eisenbahn-Gesellschaft, BLE) in 1922. Four of them, (the former Magdeburg 3859, 3863, 3825, and 3839) entered service as 3, 5, 9 (all second uses of these numbers) and 29. The fifth locomotive was scrapped for spares. Since they all came from different production batches from two different manufacturers (Henschel, BMAG) there were also design differences. The Reichsbahn took the four locomotives into stock as 53 7001 to 53 7004 (second) when the BLE was nationalised in 1938. They were retired between 1941 and 1947.
