= Class 170 =

Class 170 or 170 class may refer to:

- British Rail Class 170, a diesel multiple-unit train
- FS Class 170, a class of 2-4-0 steam locomotives
- Manila Railroad 170 class, a class of 4-8-2 steam locomotives
