= Locomotives LVCI 1-50, 155-164 =

Class of 50 Austro-Hungarian (later Italian) 2-2-2 (later 2-4-0) locomotives

LVCI 1–50, 155–164 LOMB 1–35, VEN 1–25 SFAI 31–90 RA 31-52, RM 501–518 FS Class 102
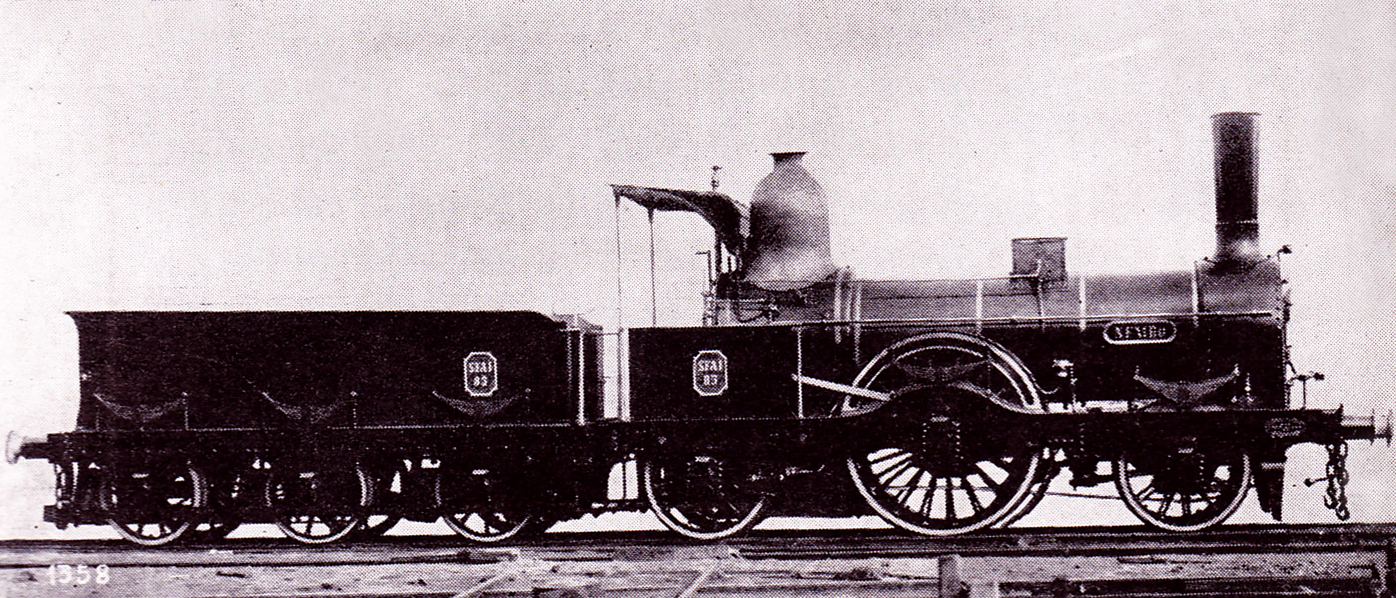
- FS Class 102 locomotive at the Esposizione di Torino in 1911
Type and origin
- Power type: Steam
- Builder: Robert Stephenson & Company; Beyer, Peacock & Company
- Build date: 1857–1858
- Total produced: 60
Specifications
- Configuration
  - Whyte: 2-2-2
- Gauge: 1,435 mm (4 ft 8 1/2 in)
- Driver dia.: 1.88 m (74 in)
- Length: 7.477 m (294.4 in)
- Loco weight: 27.6 tonnes (27.2 long tons; 30.4 short tons)
- Fuel type: Coal
- Boiler pressure: 6 atm (88 psi)
- Cylinders: 2 inside
- Cylinder size: 400 mm × 508 mm (15.7 in × 20.0 in)

Locomotives LVCI 1-50 and 155-164 were 2-2-2 steam locomotives of the LVCI built for service on the railways of the Lombard-Veneto Kingdom. Numbers 1-50 were built by Robert Stephenson & Company and numbers 155-164 were built by Beyer, Peacock & Company.

== History ==
The two series of locomotives entered service between 1857 and 1858. In 1859, following the Second Italian War of Independence, the LVCI network was divided into a Lombard part (Lombardy was annexed to the Kingdom of Sardinia) and a Venetian part (Veneto remained a possession of the Austrian Empire). Locomotives 1-50 were divided into LOMB 1-35 and VEN 1-15, while 155-164 were all assigned to the Venetian part with numbers VEN 16-25. In 1865, when the Società per le strade ferrate dell'Alta Italia (SFAI) was established, the Lombard machines were taken into the stock of this company and became SFAI 31-65. The following year, after the Third Italian War of Independence, which resulted in the annexation of the Veneto region to the Kingdom of Italy, the 25 Veneto machines also came into SFAI stock and were numbered SFAI 66-90. The SFAI scrapped 10 machines in 1874, and rebuilt another 10 with 2-4-0 wheel arrangement, giving rise to the 301-311 series.

=== The great networks ===
In 1885, with the creation of the great national networks, the locomotives were divided between the Adriatic Network (RA) and the Mediterranean Network (RM). The RA received 22 units, all of Robert Stephenson construction, and gave them numbers RA 31-52. The RM received all the Beyer Peacock units, which they numbered RM 501-510, and 8 Stephenson units, which they numbered RM 511-518.

=== Nationalization ===
In 1905, with the establishment of Italian State Railways (FS), eight units were still in operation and they were registered as FS Class 102. They comprised four Stephenson units, numbered 1021-1024, and four Beyer Peacock, numbered 1025-1028. All the locomotives were scrapped before 1910, except one which survived long enough to be shown at the Esposizione di Torino in 1911, although it was scrapped soon afterwards.
