= Locomotives SFAI 301-311 =

Type and origin
- Power type: Steam
- Builder: Stephenson
- Build date: 1857-1858; Rebuilt 1877-1882
- Total produced: 11
Specifications
- Configuration
  - Whyte: 2-4-0
- Gauge: 1,435 mm (4 ft 8 1/2 in)
- Leading dia.: 1.24 m (4 ft 1 in)
- Driver dia.: 1.882 m (6 ft 2.1 in)
- Length: 8.098 m (26 ft 6.8 in)
- Loco weight: 38.4 t (37.8 long tons; 42.3 short tons)
- Fuel type: Coal
- Firebox
  - Grate area: 2.3 m^{2} (25 sq ft)
- Cylinders: 2
- Cylinder size: 420 mm × 508 mm (16.5 in × 20.0 in)

Locomotives SFAI 301-311 of the Società per le strade ferrate dell'Alta Italia (SFAI) were a group of steam locomotives derived from the rebuilding of some machines in the 31-80 series.

== History ==
The machines, built by Stephenson in 1857–1858 with a 2-2-2 wheel arrangement, were modified with the installation of a new firebox. At the same time the wheel arrangement was modified to 2-4-0 to provide greater adhesive weight. Between 1877 and 1882, six engines were rebuilt and numbered 292 to 297. Between 1884 and 1885, four more engines were rebuilt and one new one was purchased. The entire group was then renumbered as 301–311.

== Ownership change ==
In 1885, with the creation of the great national networks, the machines were incorporated into the stock of the Rete Adriatica, which classified them as class 110 with numbers 1101–1111. They were all scrapped before 1905, so they did not transfer to the Ferrovie dello Stato.
