= National Railway Museum of Pietrarsa =

Coordinates: 40.8217°N 14.3205°E

The National Railway Museum of Pietrarsa
- Museo Nazionale Ferroviario di Pietrarsa
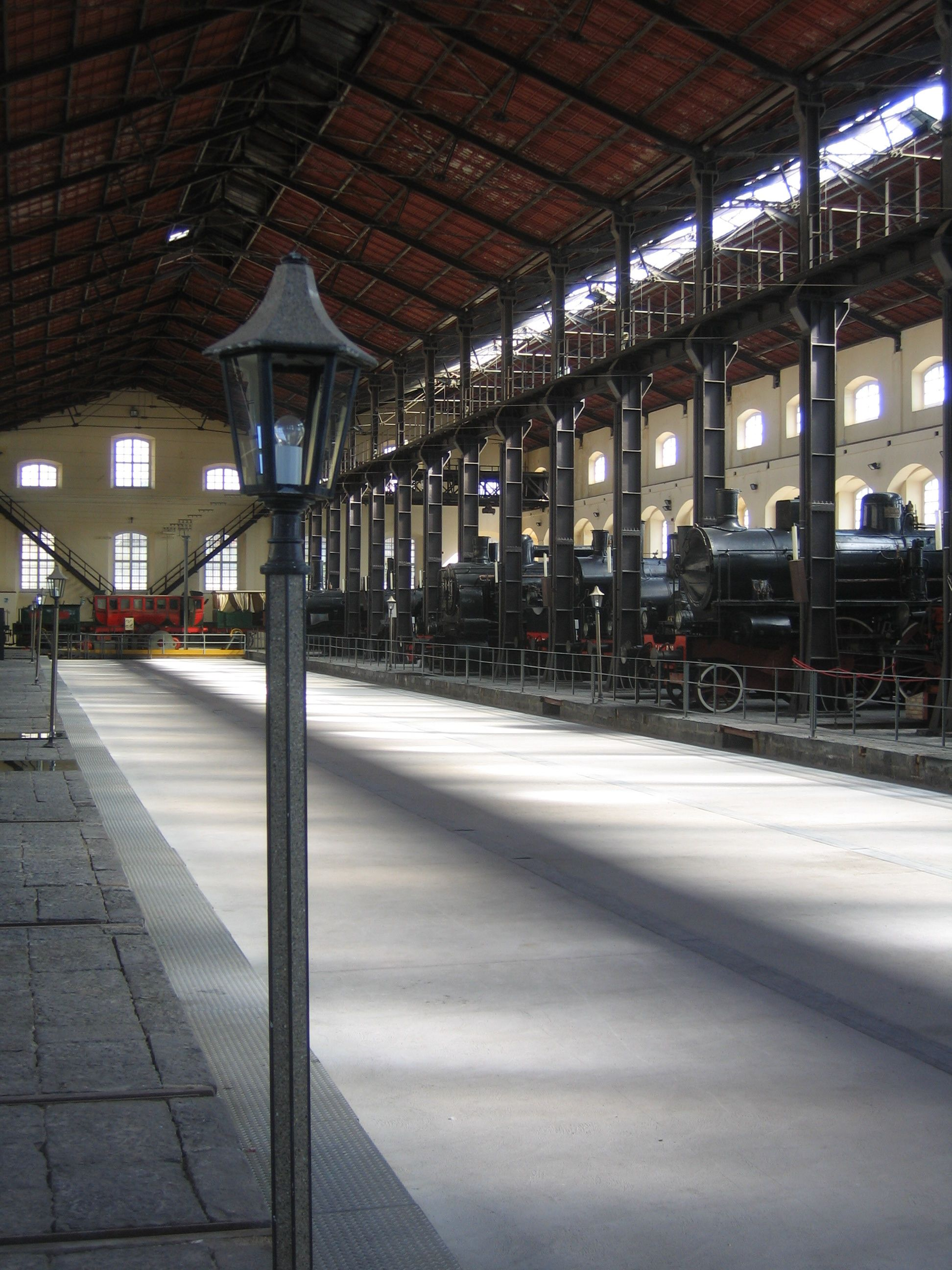
- Main exhibition hall
- Established: 7 October 1989
- Location: Traversa Pietrarsa, Naples, Campania, Italy
- Type: Railway museum
- Website: fondazionefs.it

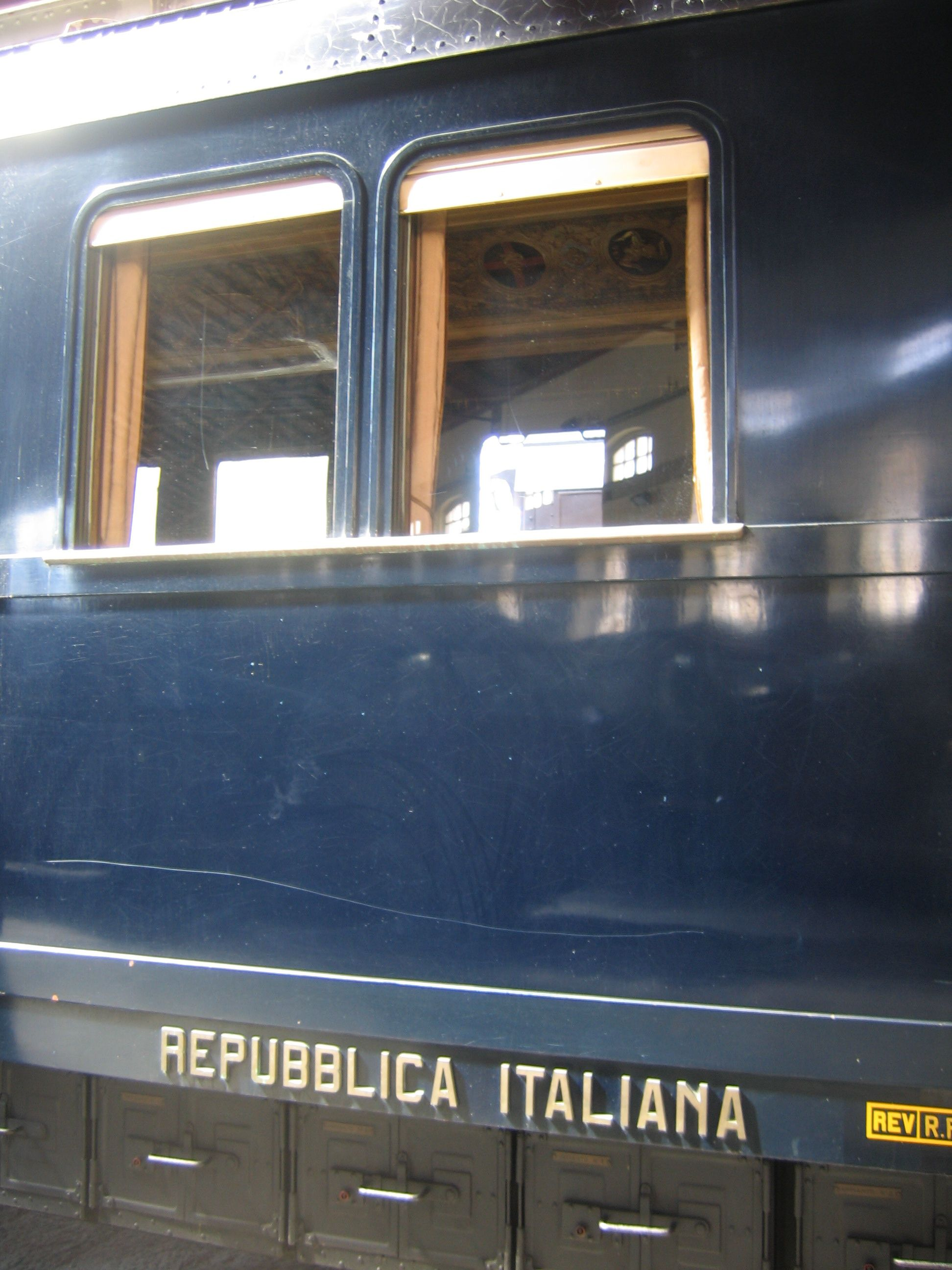
Royal carriage, taken over by the republic

The National Railway Museum of Pietrarsa (Italian: Museo Nazionale Ferroviario di Pietrarsa) is close to the Naples–Portici railway.

The museum is housed in what was originally the 'Bourbon works' Officine di Pietrarsa, founded in 1840 on the orders of Ferdinand II of Bourbon to build steam engines for ships and boilers for locomotives. The factory was organized into pavilions which housed the different production steps.

== Overview ==
In 1830, Ferdinand became king of the Kingdom of the two Sicilies. He had a small factory built in Torre Annunziata to produce steam engines for ships and ammunition for military use. This factory was part of Ferdinand's strategy to emancipate his Kingdom from foreign industrial and technological supremacy.

For closer supervision, he decided to relocate the factory next to the Royal Palace of Naples in 1937. The King met the French engineer Armand Bayard, who proposed to build Italy's first railway line from Naples to Nocera. On 3 October 1839, the first section of the line, from Naples to Portici, was inaugurated. Two locomotives arrived from England on this occasion: the 'Longridge' and the 'Vesuvio'. Another locomotive called 'Bayard' arrived in December.

The development of the railways was so significant that the King soon faced the problem of finding space to build a bigger workshop. He opted for Pietrarsa where, in 1842, the Royal Workshop for Mechanical works, nautical and locomotive production was founded. The workshop ran flat out. By the middle of the 19th century, it employed 1,100 workers and it became the largest industrial centre in Italy.

With the unification of Italy, the production was taken over by industry in the north, the Bourbon realm fell and Pietrarsa was first nationalized then reprivatized. and to private companies later. The new private owners restricted production and leading to worker protests.

After World War II, the emergence of diesel and electric traction resulted in the rapid decline of steam locomotives and consequently the decline of the Pietrarsa works. In 1975, the Pietrarsa Works were closed because it didn’t meet the new technical needs. The location underwent some restoration and, on 7 October 1989, the National Railway Museum of Pietrarsa was officially inaugurated.

== Structure ==
The Museum of Pietrarsa is among the biggest in the world by area (36,000 m2, 360 000ft2) and number of vehicles exhibited.

In the A pavilion, once used for assembly and repair of locomotives, 26 steam locomotives and 4 three-phase electric locomotives are on display. The most famous item is a replica of the Bayard locomotive, the twin of Vesuvio. It was built in 1939 for the 100th Anniversary of the Naples-Portici line. Along the walls the steam locomotives are displayed following The evolution of steam traction technology is displayed on the walls, including notable Italians inventions such as, the 910 and 740 series “Franco-Crosti”locomotives.

The B and C pavilions housed the furnaces and now display many carriages (a Centoporte wagon, three Littorine, the E.623 and E.626) One important example is the n.10 of the Royal Train built by Fiat for the marriage of Umberto II of Savoy and Maria José of Belgium. It was one of 11 carriages and is renowned for its internal furnishing.

Diesel locomotives and railcars are exhibited in the D Pavilion (formerly used for forging', while the E Pavilion is used for a cinema hall and the F pavilion showcases a selection of giant machinery from the old factory. The last Pavilion is the oldest one, built in 1840. It is known as “Cathedral” because of its arches. It displays train models and railway memorabilia as the famous Trecentotreni model.

== Sources ==
- Centro Relazioni Aziendali FS (a cura di), Da Pietrarsa e Granili a Santa Maria La Bruna, Napoli-Roma, 1971
- Museo Nazionale Ferroviario di Napoli Pietrarsa. Riuso musealistico delle antiche officine borboniche, Roma, Ferrovie dello Stato, 1982
- AGF, Da Pietrarsa a Pietrarsa. Storia e immagini del treno italiano, Roma, 1990
- A. Tanzillo (a cura di ), Il Museo Nazionale Ferroviario di Pietrarsa, (s.l. e s.d.)
- Gian Guido Turchi, 150 anni e un museo, in I Treni 99,1989
