= FS Class 420 =

SFAI Class 1200 RA Class 420 RM Class 480 FS Class 420
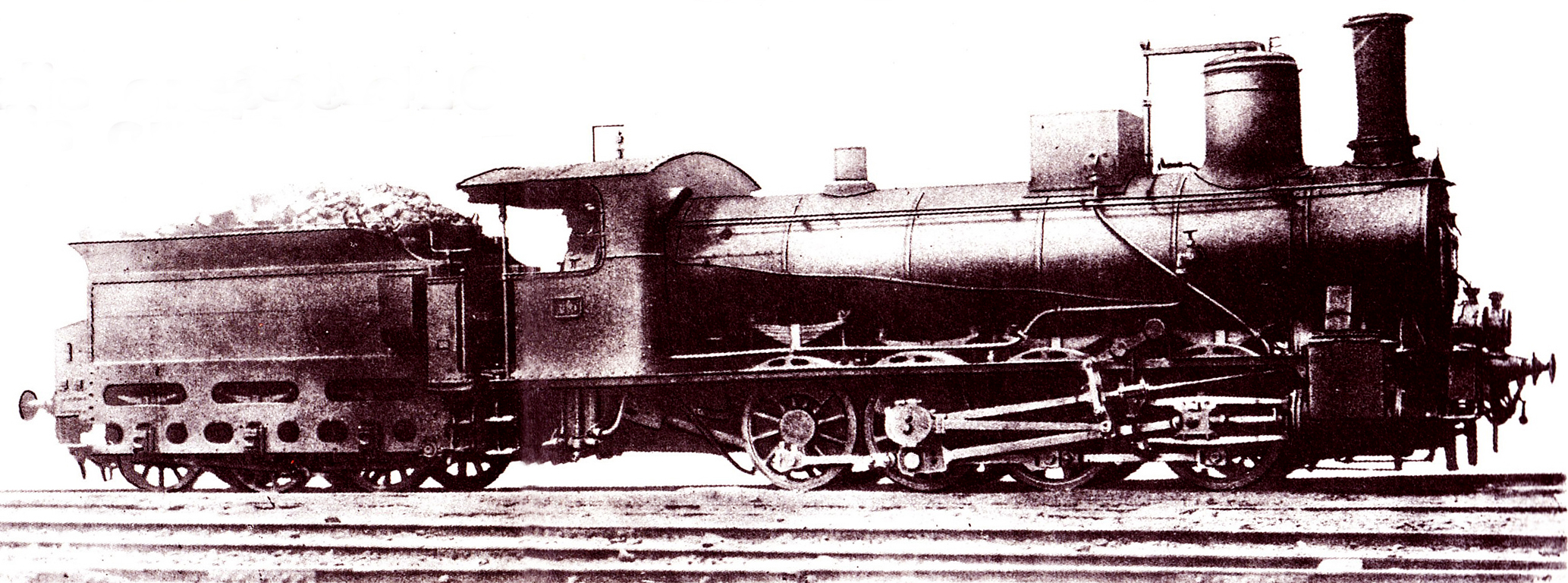
- An FS Class 420 locomotive
Type and origin
- Power type: Steam
- Builder: Cockerill, Breda, Ansaldo, Miani & Venturi, Maffei, MÁVAG, Maschinenfabrik Esslingen, Henschel & Son, Lokomotivfabrik der StEG, Naples Railway Works, Pietrarsa Railway Works, Hawthorn-Guppy of Naples
- Build date: 1873-1905
- Total produced: 293
Specifications
- Configuration
  - UIC: D'n2
- Gauge: 1,435 mm (4 ft 8 1/2 in)
- Driver dia.: 1,220 mm (48.03 in)
- Length: 16,320 mm (53 ft 7 in)
- Axle load: 14.3 tonnes (14.1 long tons; 15.8 short tons)
- Loco weight: 55.7 tonnes (54.8 long tons; 61.4 short tons)
- Tender weight: 26.7 tonnes (26.3 long tons; 29.4 short tons)
- Fuel type: Coal
- Fuel capacity: 4,000 kg (8,800 lb)
- Water cap.: 9,000 L (2,000 imp gal; 2,400 US gal)
- Firebox
  - Grate area: 2.16 m^{2} (23.3 sq ft)
- Boiler pressure: 10 kg/cm^{2} (0.981 MPa; 142 psi)
- Heating surface: 166.63 m^{2} (1,793.6 sq ft)
- Cylinders: Two, outside
- Cylinder size: 530 mm × 610 mm (20.87 in × 24.02 in)
- Valve gear: Stephenson
Performance figures
- Maximum speed: 45 km/h (28 mph)
- Power output: 620 PS (456 kW; 612 hp)
- Tractive effort: 11,450 kgf (112 kN; 25,200 lbf)

The Ferrovie dello Stato Italiane (FS; Italian State Railways) Class 420 (Italian: Gruppo 290), formerly SFAI Class 1200, Rete Adriatica Class 420 and Rete Mediterranea Class 480, was a class of 0-8-0 steam locomotives.

== Design and construction ==
In the early 1870s, the SFAI needed a locomotive suitable for heavy work on the most important mountain lines, such as the Giovi railway and the Turin-Modane railway, for which the 0-6-0 locomotives were becoming increasingly inadequate. The Ufficio d'Arte di Torino chose a 0-8-0 locomotive of the Wiener Neustädter Lokomotivfabrik (then known as "Sigl"), very similar to the Südbahn Class 35 a that it already produced.

The Class 420 was a typical long-boiler, inside-frame 0-8-0 locomotive of the era, that showed its Austrian derivation with its two-shutters smokebox door, and its outside Stephenson valve gear. The locomotives built before 1884 had the distinction of having curved foot plating over the wheels, while later units had straight foot plating and small splashers. Some of the locomotives were given a replacement boiler before 1914, but their performance remained mostly unchanged.

The first 60 locomotives were built by Sigl (from which they derived the nickname with which they were known for their whole career) for the SFAI. Production continued until 1890, from both foreign (such as Maffei) and Italian firms (such as Ansaldo and Breda), for a total of 189 locomotives; all these were divided in 1885 between the Rete Adriatica and the Rete Mediterranea. Building of further locomotives for the RM resumed in 1897, and continued until 1905, bringing the total of the Class to 293.

== Service ==
The Class 420 served on most Italian mountain lines. The first locomotives were assigned to the Genoa sheds, to serve on the Giovi lines; on the 1-in-62½ grade of the Succursale line (opened in 1889), two Class 420s were able to pull trains of 450 t (440 long tons; 500 short tons) at the speed of 20 km/h (12 mph). The units assigned to the RM in 1885 were allocated to the Porrettana railway.

Their dominance over the major mountain lines began to decline in the 1890s and 1900s, when they were replaced by more powerful locomotives such as the Class 750, and then by the Class 470 locomotives. This caused many members of the class to be assigned to secondary lines of the Po Valley, while others were sent to Sicily around 1925 to integrate the similar Class 410 locomotives stationed there.

Some units managed to survive World War II, mostly as harbour shunters, and as late as 1953 two Class 420 locomotives were still listed as active in Piedmont. None survived into preservation.
