= Officine di Pietrarsa =

Italian locomotive factory

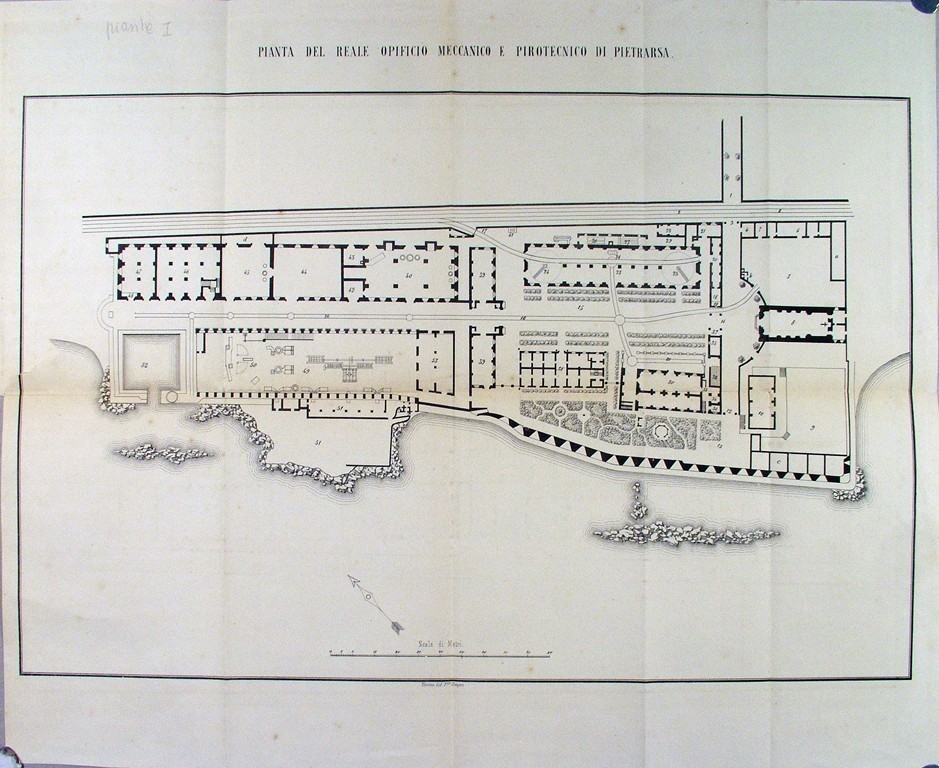
Plan of the Pietrarsa factory in 1861

Officine di Pietrarsa was the first Italian factory to produce locomotives, rails and rolling stock. It was founded in 1840 as Reale Opificio Borbonico di Pietrarsa (Royal Bourbon Factory of Pietrarsa). From 7 October 1989 the workshops, closed at the end of 1975, became the home of the National Railway Museum of Pietrarsa.

== History ==
The Officine di Pietrarsa, or Reale Opificio was conceived in 1840 by decree of Ferdinando II di Borbone as a plant capable of producing war and civilian material using iron from the Mongiana ironworks. A first factory had been built between San Giovanni a Teduccio and Portici in 1832, using land previously occupied by a coastal artillery battery.

In 1842, therefore only two years after the decree had been issued, the first building and ancillary rooms had already been completed, where about 200 workers worked among turners, adjusters, forgers and carpenters under the direction of the Captain of the Artillery, Don Luigi Corsi and other army officers who assisted him.

It is no coincidence that the Captain Corsi was chosen as director; he was already known to Ferdinand II for his invention of the famous "incendiary balls", a sort of shells that were inextinguishable in the water and for this reason they are very efficient in dripping down the enemy ship. Captain Corsi was born in Lucera, near Foggia on February 16, 1802. He was the son of Colonel Dionisio Corsi, a cavalry officer and Intendant General of the Province of L'Aquila, and Donna Filomena Carrascon, herself from a family of distinguished military officers (see Carascon).

On 22 May 1843 Ferdinando II issued an edict in which he said among other things: "It is Your Majesty's will that the factory of Pietrarsa takes care of the construction of the locomotives, as well as the repairs and needs for the locomotives themselves, the accessories of the wagons and wagons that will travel the new Naples – Capua railway". The goal was to free himself from foreign dependence on the production of the equipment required for the extension of the Ionian and Adriatic lines, started on the shore of the Tyrrhenian Sea. On 28 June 1844 the overhaul of the first two steam locomotives that had been built in England began. They were named Impavido (Fearless) and Aligero (Lightening). A similar locomotive, Bayard, had been built in England by R. B. Longridge and Company in 1839 and a replica is displayed in the museum.[Locomotiva_Bayard]

=== Production ===
In 1845, production of steam locomotives began. They were designed and partially built in England but assembled on site. There were seven locomotives, which used component parts built in England, similar to the previous models purchased in 1843 that had inaugurated the first Italian railway line, the Naples–Portici railway. They were named Pietrarsa, La Corsi, Robertson, Vesuvio, Maria Teresa, Etna and Parthenope. In 1853, the work force of Pietrarsa reached about 700 people.

On 18 May 1852, in the metallurgical department, a gigantic statue of Ferdinando II was produced as a monobloc iron casting. At about 4.5 metres high, it was one of the largest works of this kind produced in Italy. It is still exhibited in the museum. In 1856 Pietrarsa was the first factory in Italy to produce rails with puddled iron from Mongiana. However, their cost was high, owing to the high price of coal imported from England. The cost of locomotives with tenders produced at the plant was acceptable and Pietrarsa was one of only two industrial plants in Italy able to produce steam locomotives at the time.

The expansion of the factory continued until the end of the Kingdom of the Two Sicilies, supplying material of all kinds to the railways of the kingdom. In June 1860 Pietrarsa employed 1,125 people. This comprised 850 permanent workers, 200 casual workers and 75 artillerymen to keep order. At the time, it was the largest Italian engineering factory.

=== Visiting dignitaries ===
The plant had several important visitors including that of Tsar Nicholas I of Russia, who expressed his intention to use Pietrarsa as a model for the Kronstadt railway complex. In 1849 the plant was visited by Pope Pius IX.

=== Ironworks commission ===
In 1861 the Minister of the Navy Luigi Federico Menabrea established a Commissione delle ferriere (Commission of the ironworks) whose minute investigation analyzed the status of all the relevant industrial activities located on the territory of the Kingdom. The final report of the triennial investigation was published in 1864 under the care of the engineer Felice Giordano. The report showed that the costs of production of the locomotives of the two most important plants of the time (Sampierdarena and Pietrarsa) were more or less equivalent or slightly higher than those of the foreign industry. The meticulous analysis of costs and activities performed by Giordano quantified in detail the remuneration of skilled workers by category and the raw material costs of imported metal semi-finished materials. The costs at Ansaldo and Pietrarsa were shown to be substantially equivalent but the pre-eminence of these companies ended with the Bourbon regime and its protectionist policies. The higher production costs of steel products produced in the territory of the Kingdom stemmed from their foreign origin as well as the high cost of supplying the indispensable British coal.

Between 1861 and 1863 the Pietrarsa factory went into a difficult phase of its life. A report by the engineer Grandis, commissioned by the Savoy government, negatively portrayed the activity and profitability of the plant, even advising its sale or demolition. A decision was made to rationalize the steel and production sector and this choice favoured the northern industry. On 10 January 1863, the Pietrarsa plant with its contents was leased, for 30 years in the sum of 45,000 lira by the Minister of Finance of the Minghetti government to a company established by Iacopo Bozza. This resulted in job reductions, strikes and serious disorder, leading to bloody repression. On 6 August 1863 a charge of the Bersaglieri caused 7 deaths and 20 serious injuries. The first deaths were Luigi Fabbricini, Aniello Marino, Domenico Del Grosso and Aniello Olivieri.

After this, the lease was renounced and, on 20 September 1863, the government granted a new lease on the plant for 20 years to a new company, called Società nazionale di costruzioni meccaniche. This was run by the knight Gregorio Macry, the Duke Luciano Serra, the Marquis Cesare Pallavicino and the knights Maurizio Baracco and Giuseppe Carabelli. The rent started at 45,000 lira and increased every 5 years to reach a maximum of 70,000 lira. Also, the concession provided for the right to dismiss staff deemed not necessary. From 1863, Pietrarsa incorporated l'Officina dei Granili, producing metal structural works, railway carriages and mechanical parts.

=== Commission report ===
According to the final report of the Ironworks Commission, before 1863 the Pietrarsa workshops occupied an area of 33,600 square metres and had 850 workers. The equipment was of great importance as it was able to put on the production line at the same time 8 marine boilers or 24 locomotive boilers. The department of ironworks was equipped with 12 puddling ovens and 5 rolling mill trains, one of which was specialized for rails. The foundry department had a 12.5 tonne reverberatory furnace and 10 ovens of various types with capacities of 8.5 tonnes and 250 kg for a complex of 36 tonnes of workable iron. The foundry also had a bronze department with a 1,880 kg reverberatory oven, a 600 kg oven and various other small ovens and crucibles. The equipment was completed by three steam hammers (of 4,500, 3,500 and 800 kg) and 4 large cranes as well as all accessory equipment.

=== Contraction and expansion ===
A locomotive for freight trains built at Pietrarsa earned a gold medal at the 1873 Vienna World's Fair. However, the drastic downsizing of Pietrarsa's labour force continued until only 100 workers remained. In 1877 the state finally intervened and took over the management directly under the direction of the engineer Passerini. This revived the company's fortunes and reversed the decline in production capacity. From 1877 to 1885, about 110 locomotives were produced, over 800 freight wagons and nearly 300 passenger carriages as well as spare parts for rolling stock. Following the Conventions of 1885 and the establishment of large railway networks, the Pietrarsa workshops were assigned to the Rete Mediterranea (Mediterranean Network) and remained part of it until 1905 when, following railway nationalization, the factory became part of the primary infrastructure of the new Ferrovie dello Stato becoming one of the large repair workshops specializing in particular in steam locomotives.

== Review ==
According to data provided by the official list of locomotives and railcars in service and under construction at 30 June 1914, published in 1915 by Ferrovie dello Stato, Pietrarsa produced, between 1867 and 1888, hundreds of steam locomotives with tenders for Rete Mediterranea (the Mediterranean Network), Rete Adriatica (the Adriatic Network) and their constituents. Of these, 192 were taken over by FS and registered as classes 120, 155, 185, 190, 200, 206, 215, 265, 268, 385, 391 and 420.

However, after 1888, orders for the construction of locomotives were directed to foreign factories or to northern Italy and Pietrarsa was downgraded to a maintenance and repair plant. New railway traction systems (electric and diesel) gradually displaced steam and led to the slow but inexorable decline of the plant until a closure order was issued on 15 November 1975. The last steam locomotive to be repaired (640.088) left the workshops on 2 December of the same year.

After a long period of neglect, the decision was made to transform Pietrarsa into a railway museum, housing it in the same environment that had been the oldest Italian locomotive factory. The inauguration of the museum took place on 7 October 1989 on the occasion of the 150th anniversary of the Italian railways. Later it was closed again and, after a long period of renovation, the museum was reopened on 19 December 2007.
