= FS Class 552 =

RA 180 bis FS Class 552
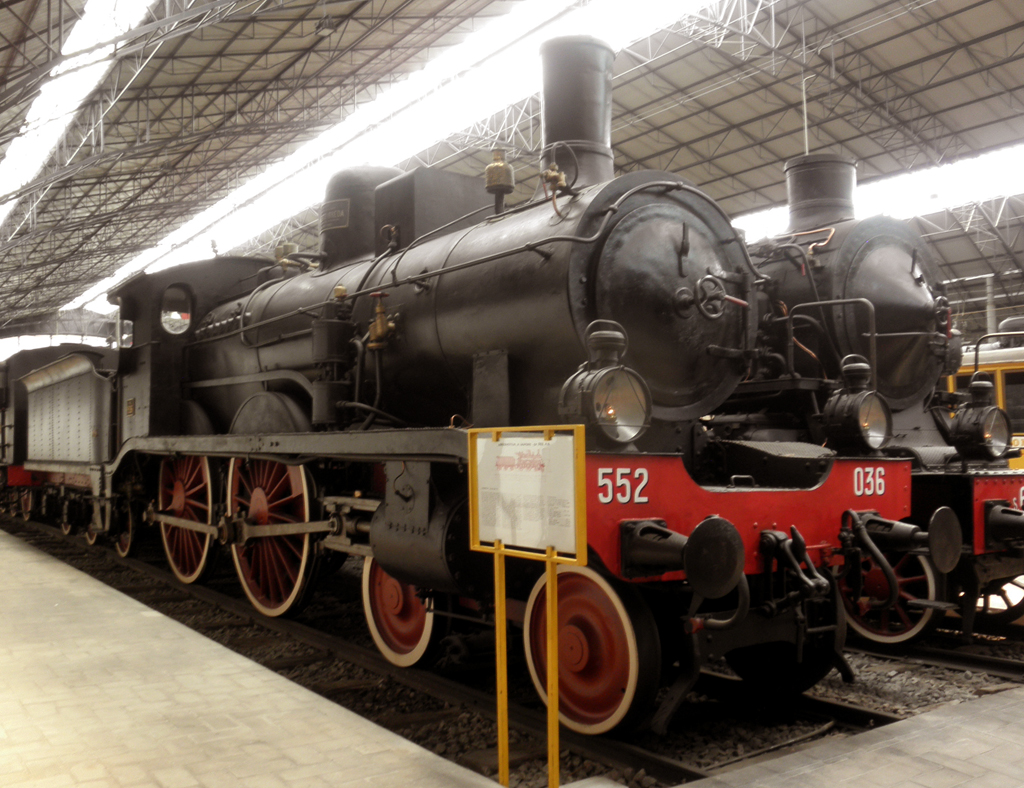
- FS locomotive 552.036 as preserved at the Museo nazionale scienza e tecnologia, Milan
Type and origin
- Power type: Steam
- Builder: Gio. Ansaldo & C. (12), Ernesto Breda (24)
- Build date: 1890–1901
- Total produced: 36
Specifications
- Configuration
  - Whyte: 4-4-0
  - UIC: 2′B n2
- Gauge: 1,435 mm (4 ft 8 1/2 in)
- Leading dia.: 960 mm (37.80 in)
- Driver dia.: 1,920 mm (75.59 in)
- Length: 9,173 mm (30 ft 1.1 in)
- Axle load: 14.8 tonnes (14.6 long tons; 16.3 short tons)
- Loco weight: 48.3 tonnes (47.5 long tons; 53.2 short tons)
- Tender weight: 29.9 tonnes (29.4 long tons; 33.0 short tons)
- Fuel type: Coal
- Fuel capacity: 4,000 kg (8,800 lb)
- Water cap.: 12,000 L (2,600 imp gal; 3,200 US gal)
- Firebox
  - Grate area: 2.3 m^{2} (25 sq ft)
- Boiler pressure: 12 kg/cm^{2} (1.18 MPa; 171 psi)
- Heating surface: 163.9 m^{2} (1,764 sq ft)
- Cylinders: Two, outside
- Cylinder size: 480 mm × 600 mm (18.90 in × 23.62 in)
- Valve gear: Stephenson
Performance figures
- Maximum speed: 100 km/h (62 mph)
- Power output: 650 CV (478 kW; 641 hp)
- Tractive effort: 6,570 kgf (64.4 kN; 14,500 lbf)

The Ferrovie dello Stato Italiane (FS; Italian State Railways) Class 552 (Italian: Gruppo 552), formerly Rete Adriatica Class 180 bis, is a 4-4-0 steam locomotive; it was the final development in Italy of the 'American' express locomotive type.

== Design and construction ==
Last in a line of successful 4-4-0 locomotives designed in Florence, the Class 552 was basically an evolution of the earlier Class 545 and Class 550 locomotives, with a larger boiler and bigger cylinders. The class was initially fitted with a prototype tender similar to the definitive one, but with only 10,500 litres (2,300 imp gal; 2,800 US gal) of water.

The first series of 24 units was built in 1890 by Ernesto Breda and Ansaldo (12 units each); 12 more were built by Breda from 1900 to 1901.

== Service ==
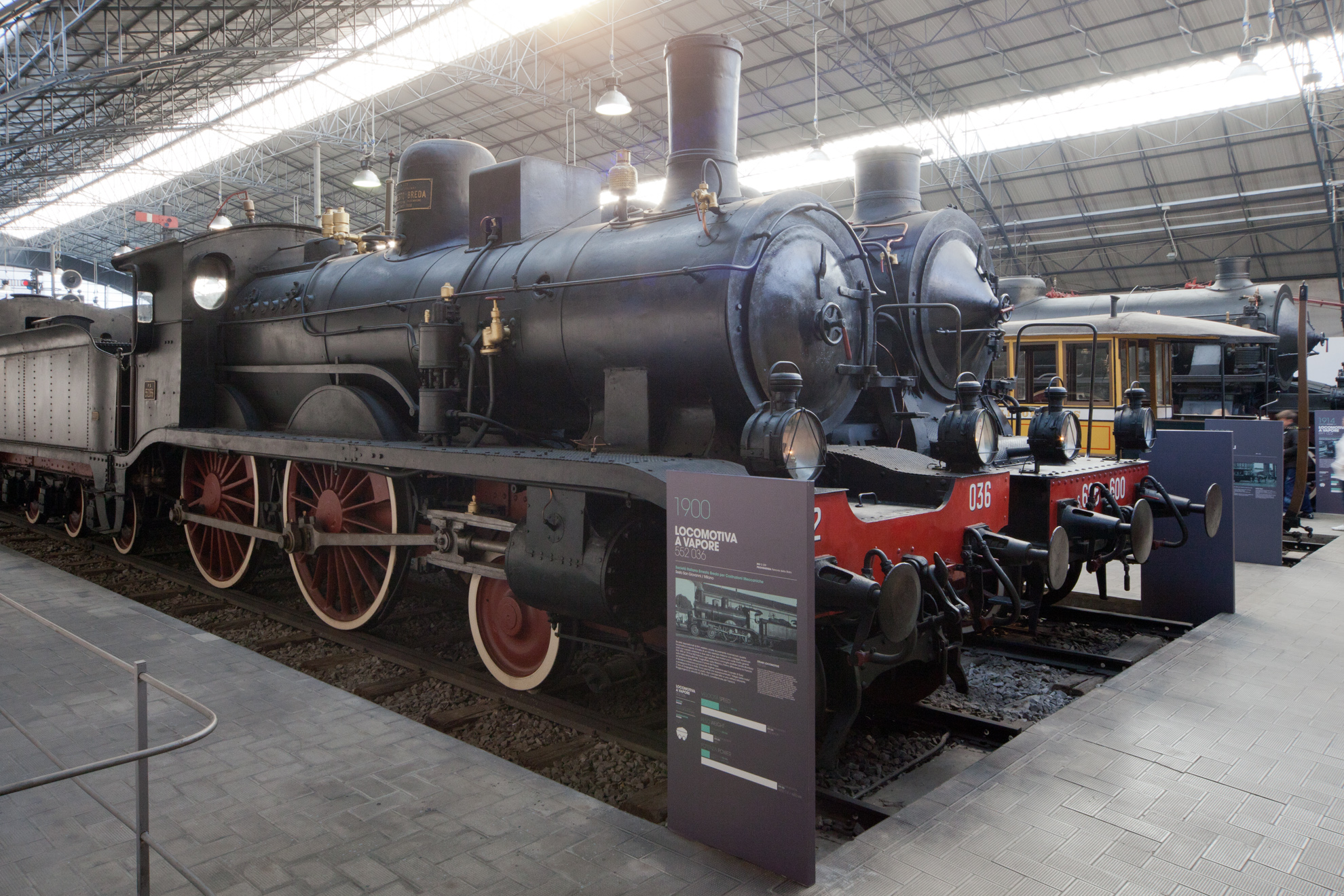
The FS Gr 552 - 036 exposed at the Museo nazionale scienza e tecnologia, Milan

The Class 552 (until 1905, when the FS were formed, classified RA 180 bis and numbered 1865–1900) were primarily assigned to the most prestigious fast passenger trains of their time, notably the India Mail or Peninsular Express (called in Italian Valigia delle Indie), which was part of the P&O relation between London and Bombay; in Italy, this train ran the itinerary Modane-Turin-Alessandria-Bologna-Ancona-Brindisi, where a ship took the passengers to Alexandria.

However, they were the swan song of the two-wheeled express locomotives in Italy, as their relatively modest performance, 110 tonnes (110 long tons; 120 short tons) at 80 km/h (50 mph), quickly became insufficient; with the introduction of more powerful locomotives with three driving wheels (such as the Class 630 or the Class 670), the Class 552 was soon relegated to secondary roles. However, unlike its predecessors (all disappeared by the 1930s), some locomotives of the class managed to survive until 1946, working around Treviso.

== Preservation ==
One Class 552, the 552.036, survived into preservation; she is currently a static exhibit in the Museo della Scienza e della Tecnologia "Leonardo da Vinci" in Milan.
