= Locomotives SFAI 250-258 =

SFSP 99-104 / VE later SFAI 250-258 later RM 2707-2715 later FS Class 111
Type and origin
- Power type: Steam
- Builder: Stephenson
- Build date: 1855, 1860
- Total produced: 9
Specifications
- Configuration
  - Whyte: 0-4-2
- Gauge: 1,435 mm (4 ft 8 1/2 in)
- Driver dia.: 1.375 m (54.1 in)
- Loco weight: 26.8 tonnes (26.4 long tons; 29.5 short tons)
- Fuel type: Coal
- Cylinders: 2 inside
- Valve gear: Stephenson
Performance figures
- Maximum speed: 50 km/h (31 mph)

Locomotives SFAI 250-258 were 0-4-2 steam locomotives (with tenders) of the Società per le strade ferrate dell'Alta Italia (SFAI).

== History ==
The first six units were built in 1855 for the Strade Ferrate dello Stato Piemontese (SFSP), where they carried the numbers 99-104. Five years later, in 1860, three similar locomotives were built for the Victor Emmanuel Railway (VE). In 1865, with the establishment of the SFAI, they entered SFAI stock with the numbers 250-255 for the former SFSP units, and 256-258 for the former VE units. In 1885, with the creation of the great national networks, the machines were assigned to the Rete Mediterranea (RM), where they assumed the numbers 2707-2715. In 1905, at the establishment of the Italian State Railways (FS), 8 units were still in operation, and they were classified as Class 111 with the numbers 1111-1118. After a few years they were withdrawn and scrapped.
