= Oldenburg G 4.2 =

Oldenburg G 4.2 DRG Class 53.10
Type and origin
- Builder: Hanomag
- Build date: 1895–1909
- Total produced: 27
Specifications
- Configuration
  - Whyte: 0-6-0
- Driver dia.: 1,330 mm (52 3/8 in)
- Length
  - Over beams: 15,136 mm (49 ft 8 in)
- Axle load: 102…166: 13.4 t (13.2 long tons; 14.8 short tons); 179…193: 13.5 t (13.3 long tons; 14.9 short tons)
- Adhesive weight: 102…166: 40.2 t (39.6 long tons; 44.3 short tons); 179…193: 41.7 t (41.0 long tons; 46.0 short tons)
- Empty weight: 102…166: 34.6 t (34.1 long tons; 38.1 short tons); 179…193: 36.4 t (35.8 long tons; 40.1 short tons)
- Service weight: 102…166: 40.2 t (39.6 long tons; 44.3 short tons); 179…193: 41.7 t (41.0 long tons; 46.0 short tons)
- Tender type: 3 T 12
- Fuel capacity: 102…122: 4 t (8,820 lb) coal; 155…193: 5 t (11,000 lb) coal
- Water cap.: 12 m^{3} (2,600 imp gal; 3,200 US gal)
- Boiler pressure: 12 kgf/cm^{2} (1.18 MPa; 171 lbf/in^{2})
- Heating surface
  - Firebox: 1.53 m^{2} (16.5 sq ft)
  - Evaporative: 102…166: 117.46 m^{2} (1,264.3 sq ft); 179…193: 112.66 m^{2} (1,212.7 sq ft)
- Cylinders: 2, compound
- High-pressure cylinder: 460 mm (18 1/8 in)
- Low-pressure cylinder: 650 mm (25 9/16 in)
- Piston stroke: 630 mm (24 13/16 in)
- Valve gear: 102…166: Allan; 179…193: Walschaerts
Performance figures
- Maximum speed: 45 km/h (28 mph)
Career
- Numbers: GOE: 102–106, 117–122, 155–159, 165–166, 179–184, 191–193; DRG: 53 1001–1003, 53 1051–1058
- Retired: 1927

The Oldenburg G 4.2 steam locomotives were goods train engines built for the Grand Duchy of Oldenburg State Railways (Großherzoglich Oldenburgische Staatseisenbahnen) between 1895 and 1909 in several series.

== History ==
They were compound locomotives manufactured by Hanomag based on a Prussian design, the Prussian G 4.2. Of the total of 27 examples, 19 were to have been taken over in 1923 by the Deutsche Reichsbahn as DRG class 53.10 with numbers 53 1001–1011 and 53 1051–1058. In the 1925 DRG renumbering plan for steam locomotives, however, only eleven engines were listed: numbers 53 1001–1003 and 53 1051–1058. Numbers 53 1001 and 1002 (previously 53 1004 and 1005) came from the first series, number 53 1003 (previously 53 1011) from the second and 53 1051-1058 from the third.

== Description ==
The first vehicles were equipped with an outside valve gear of the Allan type. The 15 engines delivered from 1907 had an outside Walschaerts valve gear. The latter were also fitted with a Ranafier steam dryer and a steam dome.

On a line with a 0.5% incline, the engines attained a speed of 30 km/h when hauling a 500 tonne train.

== See also ==
- Grand Duchy of Oldenburg State Railways
- List of Oldenburg locomotives and railbuses
- Länderbahnen
