= FS Class 113 =

Class of Italian steam locomotives

Locomotive Class FS 113 SFSP 1–8, FAS 10–13 SFAI 210–238, SFCS 1–10 RM 2733–2773
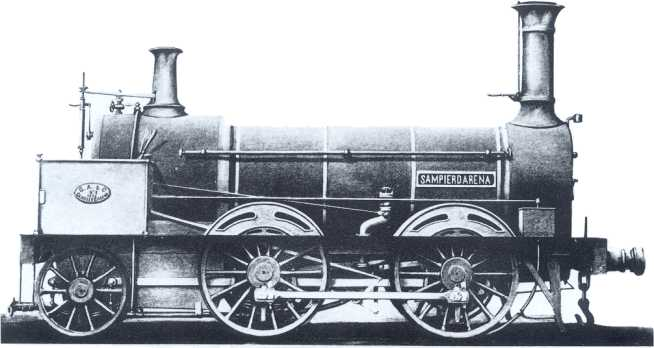
- Ansaldo Steam Engine Sampierdarena
Type and origin
- Power type: Steam
- Builder: Gio. Ansaldo & C.
- Build date: 1854–1869
- Total produced: 40
Specifications
- Configuration
  - Whyte: 0-4-2
- Gauge: 1,435 mm (4 ft 8 1/2 in)
- Fuel type: Coal
- Cylinders: Two, inside
- Valve gear: Stephenson
Performance figures
- Maximum speed: 65 km/h (40 mph)

FS Class 113 was a class of 0-4-2 steam locomotives of the Ferrovie dello Stato (FS), inherited from older railway companies on the nationalization of Italian railways in 1905. They were built by Gio. Ansaldo & C. between 1854 and 1869.

== History ==
Some of the locomotives were from Strade Ferrate dello Stato Piemontese (SFSP). The first 8 locomotives were built between 1854 and 1855 and among them was the famous Sampierdarena, the first entirely Italian construction of Giovanni Ansaldo's locomotive factory. A group of 4 units, built in 1857, came from the Ferrovia Alessandria–Stradella, (private under concession). While another 18 units had been built for the Società per le strade ferrate dell'Alta Italia (SFAI). In 1865 they all passed to the SFAI, which had absorbed all the various local companies and the former Piedmontese state railways.

A further 10 units were built, between 1863 and 1869, for the Victor Emmanuel Railway, later the Società per le Strade Ferrate Calabro-Sicule (SFCS) for use on the Calabrian-Sicilian lines and they were numbered SFCS 1-10. The first three, named Archimede, Diodoro and Novelli, inaugurated the Palermo - Bagheria line, the first railway section on the island of Sicily, on 28 April 1863.

In 1885 all 40 passed to the Rete Mediterranea (RM), which numbered them RM 2733-2773. In 1905, the Ferrovie dello Stato registered only 25 units and assigned them to Class 113, with numbers from 1131 to 1155. However, these were obsolete machines which were soon withdrawn and scrapped. They are not included in the FS list of locomotives and railcars at 30 June 1914.
