= FS Class 122 =

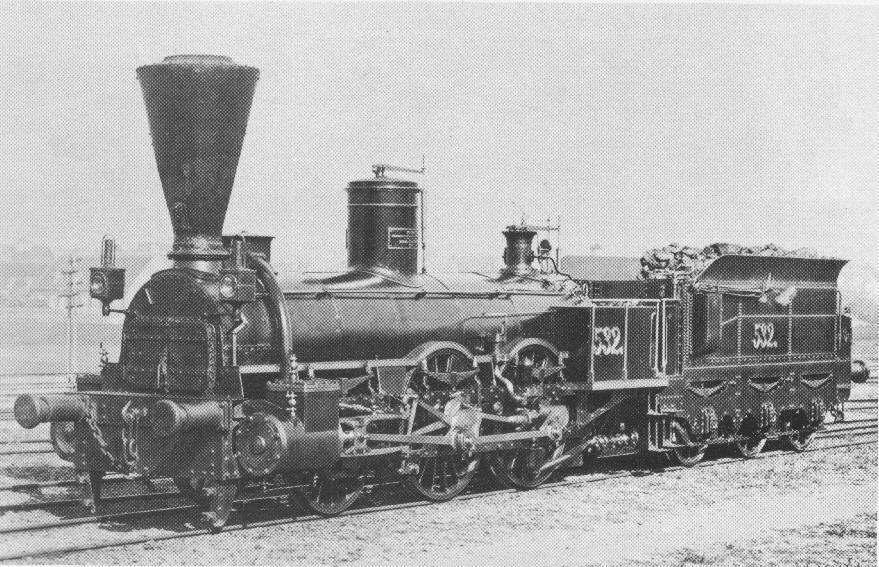
- SB 18.532, a locomotive of the same type as FS 122
Type and origin
- Power type: Steam
- Builder: Floridsdorf and Sigl
- Build date: 1869–1872
- Total produced: 32 (to FS)
Specifications
- Configuration
  - Whyte: 2-4-0
- Gauge: 1,435 mm (4 ft 8 1/2 in)
- Leading dia.: 1.264 m (49.8 in)
- Driver dia.: 1.58 m (62 in)
- Length: 8.27 m (27.1 ft)
- Loco weight: 32.4 tonnes (31.9 long tons; 35.7 short tons)
- Fuel type: Coal
- Cylinders: 2 outside
- Cylinder size: 411 mm × 632 mm (16.2 in × 24.9 in)
- Valve gear: Outside Stephenson
Performance figures
- Maximum speed: 65 km/h (40 mph)
- Power output: 310 kW (420 hp)

FS Class 122 were 2-4-0 steam locomotives with tenders, designed for hauling passenger trains. The Italian State Railways (FS) acquired 32 of them as war reparations after World War I from the Austrian Südbahn (SB).

== History ==
Following the reparations resulting from the First World War, 32 units arrived at the Italian FS, which classified them as Class 122. Deliveries took place in two phases: 23 units were delivered by 1919, while the other nine were delivered following subsequent agreements between 1922 and 1923 concerning the territorial distribution of the railway lines and Sudbahn plants. Being obsolete machines, they were soon withdrawn and had been scrapped by the end of the 1920s.

== Technical details ==
The locomotives had a 2-4-0 wheel arrangement. The engine was simple expansion with two outside cylinders and outside Stephenson valve gear. The tender had three axles.

== Numbering ==
FS number	SB number	Builder	Build date	Scrapping date
122.001	18.467	Floridsdorf	1873	1928
122.002	18.468	Floridsdorf	1873	?
122.003	18.469	Floridsdorf	1873	?
122.004	18.470	Floridsdorf	1873	?
122.005	18.471	Floridsdorf	1873	?
122.006	18.472	Floridsdorf	1873	?
122.007	18.473	Sigl	1872	?
122.008	18.475	Sigl	1872	?
122.009	18.476	Sigl	1872	1928
122.010	18.477	Sigl	1872	1928
122.011	18.478	Sigl	1872	?
122.012	18.479	Sigl	1872	1929
122.013	18.480	Sigl	1872	?
122.014	18.481	Sigl	1872	?
122.015	18.482	Sigl	1872	1924
122.016	18.483	Sigl	1872	?
122.017	18.485	Sigl	1872	?
122.018	18.488	Sigl	1872	?
122.019	18.489	Sigl	1872	?
122.020	18.474	Sigl	1872	?
122.021	18.491	Sigl	1869	1922
122.022	18.493	Sigl	1869	1928
122.023	18.496	Sigl	1869	1928
122.024	18.497	Sigl	1869	?
122.025	18.498	Sigl	1869	1929
122.026	18.499	Sigl	1869	?
122.027	18.484	Sigl	1872	?
122.028	18.487	Sigl	1872	?
122.029	18.486	Sigl	1872	?
122.030	18.490	Sigl	1869	?
122.031	18.492	Sigl	1869	?
122.032	18.495	Sigl	1869	?
