= FS Class 103 =

SFSP 34–38 and 80–89 SFAI 91–110 RM 519–538 FS 103
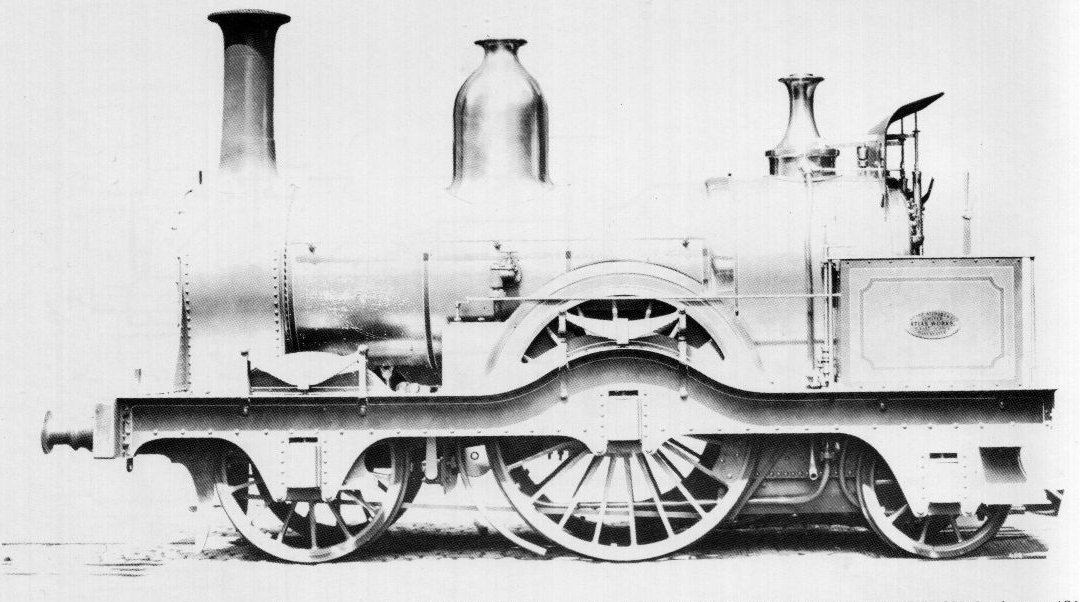
- Locomotive SFAI 109
Type and origin
- Power type: Steam
- Builder: Sharp, Stewart and Company
- Serial number: 724–728, 832–836, 848–852, 1514–1518
- Build date: 1853–1855, 1864
- Total produced: 20
Specifications
- Configuration
  - Whyte: 2-2-2
  - UIC: 1A1 n2
- Gauge: 1,435 mm (4 ft 8 1/2 in)
- Driver dia.: 1.981 m (6 ft 6 in)
- Length: 14.211 m (46 ft 7 1/2 in) (tender included)
- Adhesive weight: 12.5 tonnes (12.3 long tons; 13.8 short tons)
- Loco weight: 27.4 tonnes (27.0 long tons; 30.2 short tons)
- Fuel type: Coal
- Boiler pressure: 7 bar (700 kPa; 102 psi)
- Cylinders: Two, inside
- Cylinder size: 406 mm × 508 mm (16 in × 20 in)
- Valve gear: Stephenson
Performance figures
- Maximum speed: 80 km/h (50 mph)
- Power output: 220 kW (300 hp)

FS Class 103 was a class of 2-2-2 steam locomotives of the Italian State Railways (FS), originally built for the Strade Ferrate dello Stato Piemontese (SFSP).

== History ==
Fifteen locomotives were built in Britain between 1853 and 1855 by Sharp, Stewart and Company and were numbered 34 to 38 and 80 to 89 by the SFSP, which used them for the haulage of fast trains. In 1865 they passed to Società per le strade ferrate dell'Alta Italia (SFAI) which numbered them from 91 to 105. In 1864, SFAI purchased another five units and numbered them 106 to 110. In 1885 they were taken over by Rete Mediterranea (RM) where they were numbered 519 to 538. In 1905, only 5 units survived to be taken over by Ferrovie dello Stato (FS), which registered them as Class 103 with numbers from 1031 to 1035. Since these were obsolete machines, they were all scrapped by 1910.

== Technical details ==
The driving wheels had a diameter of just under 2 metres and this allowed them to reach 80 km/h. The design of the engines was typically British with outside frames and inside cylinders. The tender carried 7 tons of water and 3 tons of coal. They developed 300 horsepower.
