= Südbahn Class 23 =

Class of Austrian steam locomotives

SB 23 (alt), 29 BBÖ 49 / JDŽ 124 / MÁV 332 / FS 193 ÖBB 153
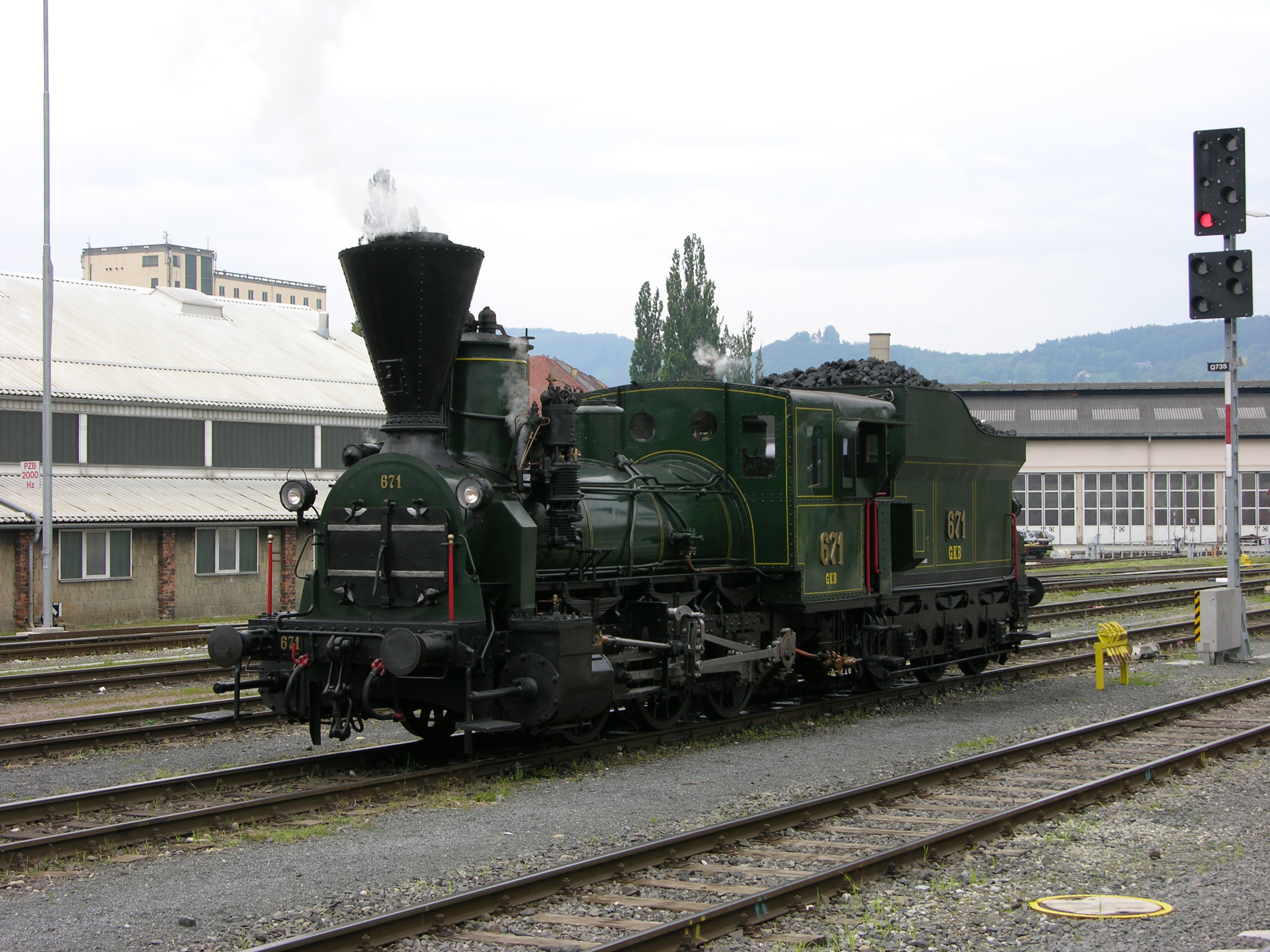
- GKB 671, ex BBÖ 49.03, ex SB 671
Specifications
- Configuration
  - Whyte: 0-6-0
- Gauge: 1,435 mm (4 ft 8 1/2 in) standard gauge
- Driver dia.: 1,245 mm (4 ft 1.0 in)
- Wheelbase
  - Overall: 2,950 mm (9 ft 8 in)
  - incl. tender: 9,894 mm (32 ft 5.5 in)
- Length
  - Over beams: 14,254 mm (46 ft 9.2 in)
- Adhesive weight: 38.0 t (37.4 long tons; 41.9 short tons)
- Service weight: 38.0 t (37.4 long tons; 41.9 short tons)
- Tender type: SB 12
- Fuel capacity: 5.4 t (5.3 long tons; 6.0 short tons) coal
- Water cap.: 8.4 m^{3} (1,800 imp gal; 2,200 US gal)
- Boiler
- No. of heating tubes: 183
- Boiler pressure: 6.75 bar (675 kPa; 97.9 psi)
- Heating surface
  - Firebox: 1.59 m^{2} (17.1 sq ft)
  - Radiative: 8.50 m^{2} (91.5 sq ft)
  - Evaporative: 113.20 m^{2} (1,218.5 sq ft)
- Cylinder size: 460 mm (18.11 in)
- Piston stroke: 632 mm (24.88 in)
Performance figures
- Maximum speed: 45 km/h (28 mph)

The steam locomotives of Südbahn Class 23 (old) were goods train engines worked by the Austrian Southern Railway (österreichische Südbahn).

== History ==
The precursors to the Austrian Southern Railway had a very disparate fleet of goods locomotives. The Southern Railway therefore had a six-coupled freight locomotive developed which was based the French Bourbonnais prototype. This series was initially given the designation 23, but was reclassified to 29 in 1864. The Lokomotivfabrik der StEG engine works delivered 20 units in 1860, which proved themselves so well that a total of 205 were built up to 1872 by this factory along with the Wiener Neustädter Lokomotivfabrik and Maschinenfabrik Esslingen.

== Modifications ==
Over time there were several modifications, such as the driver's cab in 1861 and adding vacuum brake with sound absorbers and new boilers in the 1880s.

== Dispersal ==
After nationalisation in 1924 the Federal Railway of Austria (BBÖ) took over 47 units, that were grouped into BBÖ Class 49. After the Second World War a few engines, classified by the Deutsche Reichsbahn as DRB 53.7111–7116, remained in Austria. Of these, the ÖBB only took over number 153.7114 but withdrew it in 1953.

=== Yugoslavia ===
Yugoslavia designated the locomotives that it received as JŽ 124.

=== Hungary ===
In Hungary they became MÁV 332.

=== Italy ===
In Italy they became FS 193.

Locomotives in FS Class 193

FS number	New SB number	Builder	Date built	Date scrapped
193.001	29.799	StEg	1867	1928
193.002	29.800	StEg	1867	?
193.003	29.801	StEg	1867	?
193.004	29.802	StEg	1867	?
193.005	29.803	StEg	1867	?
193.006	29.804	StEg	1867	?
193.007	29.806	Sigl	1867	?
193.008	29.811	Sigl	1867	?
193.009	29.812	Sigl	1867	?
193.010	29.813	Sigl	1867	?
193.011	29.784	StEg	1866	?
193.012	29.785	StEg	1866	?
193.013	29.786	StEg	1866	?
193.014	29.787	StEg	1866	?
193.015	29.805	Sigl	1867	1928
193.016	29.788	StEg	1866	1928
193.017	29.789	StEg	1866	?
193.018	29.790	StEg	1866	?
193.019	29.791	StEg	1866	1928
193.020	29.792	StEg	1866	?
193.021	29.793	StEg	1866	?
193.022	29.794	StEg	1866	?
193.023	29.795	StEg	1866	1928
193.024	29.796	StEg	1866	1928
193.025	29.797	StEg	1866	1928
193.026	29.798	StEg	1866	1928

== Preservation ==
Five members of the class are preserved.

During the 1920s the BBÖ sold several engines to the Graz-Köflacher Bahn (GKB). Three of them, built in 1860, were preserved alongside two other Class 23:

- One of them, number GKB 671, is still working today, albeit with some small modifications such as compressed-air brakes thanks to the work of the Steirischen Eisenbahnfreunde (Styrian Railway Society). Built in 1860, the Austrian-made Südbahn Class 23 (old) locomotive on the Graz-Köflach railway (GKB), is the longest serving steam engine in the world. It is frequently on duty and is used to haul steam specials.
- GKB 674 ex Südbahn 674, has been preserved by the Budapest transport museum and restored with its early roofless drivers cab.
- GKB 680 now belongs to the German Museum of Technology in Berlin.
- Südbahn 718, used by Yugoslav railways, resides in the Slovenian Railway Museum. Built in 1861, was restored with Südbahn livery and an open-top cab.
- Südbahn 852, used by ÖBB until 1958, is awaiting restoration, tenderless, at heizhaus Strasshof.
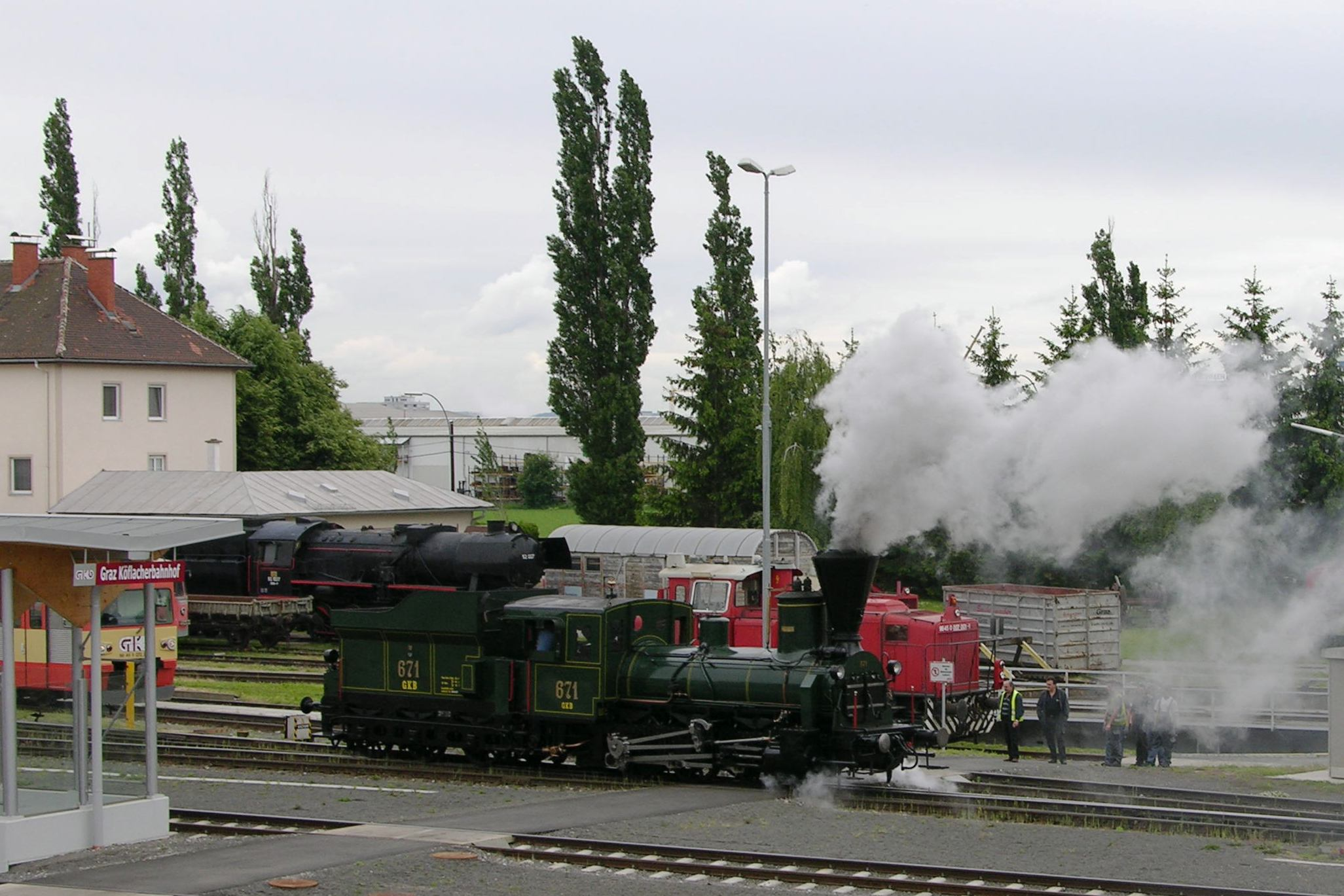
GKB 671 in 2017.

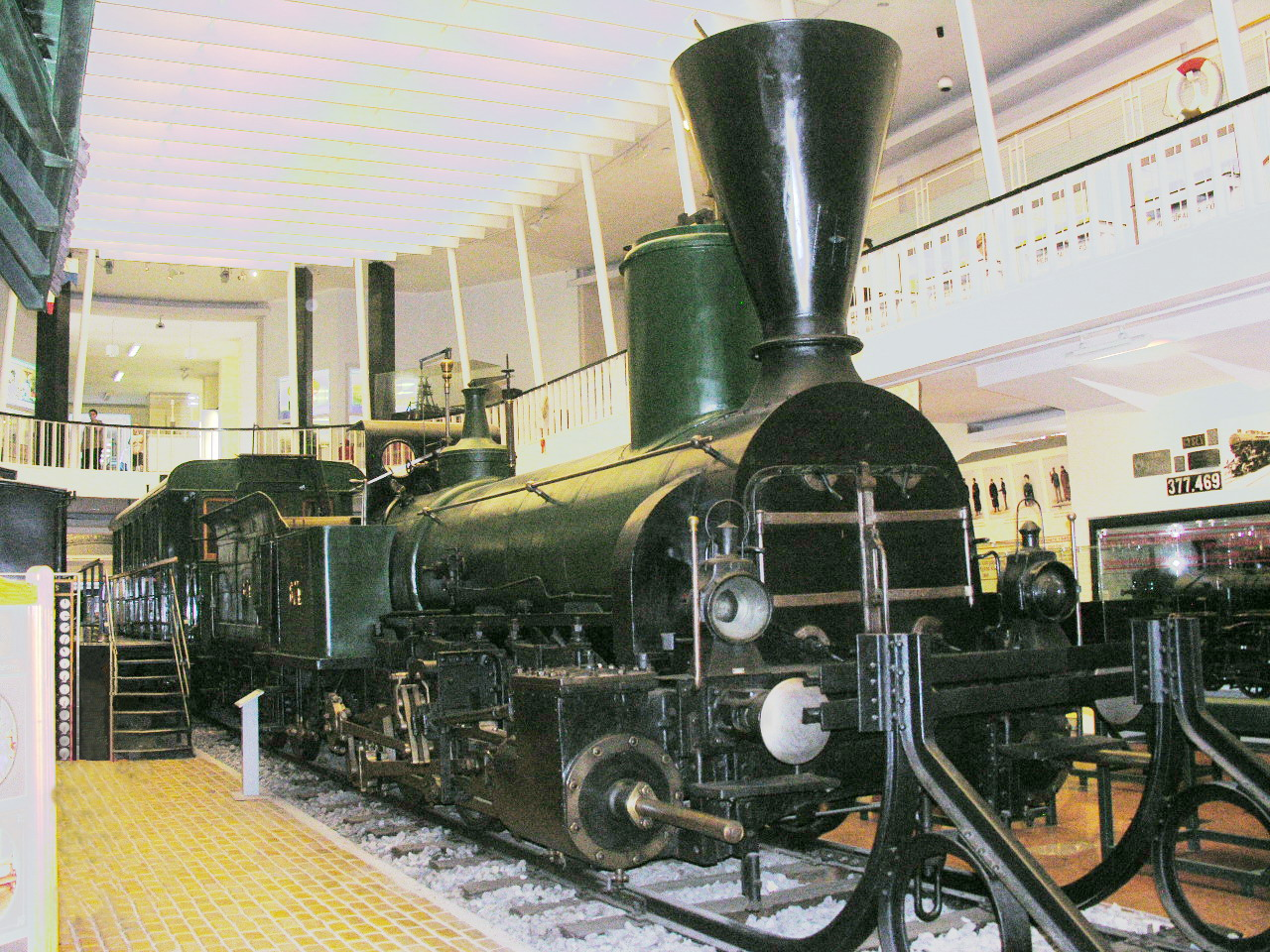
Südbahn 674 in Budapest.

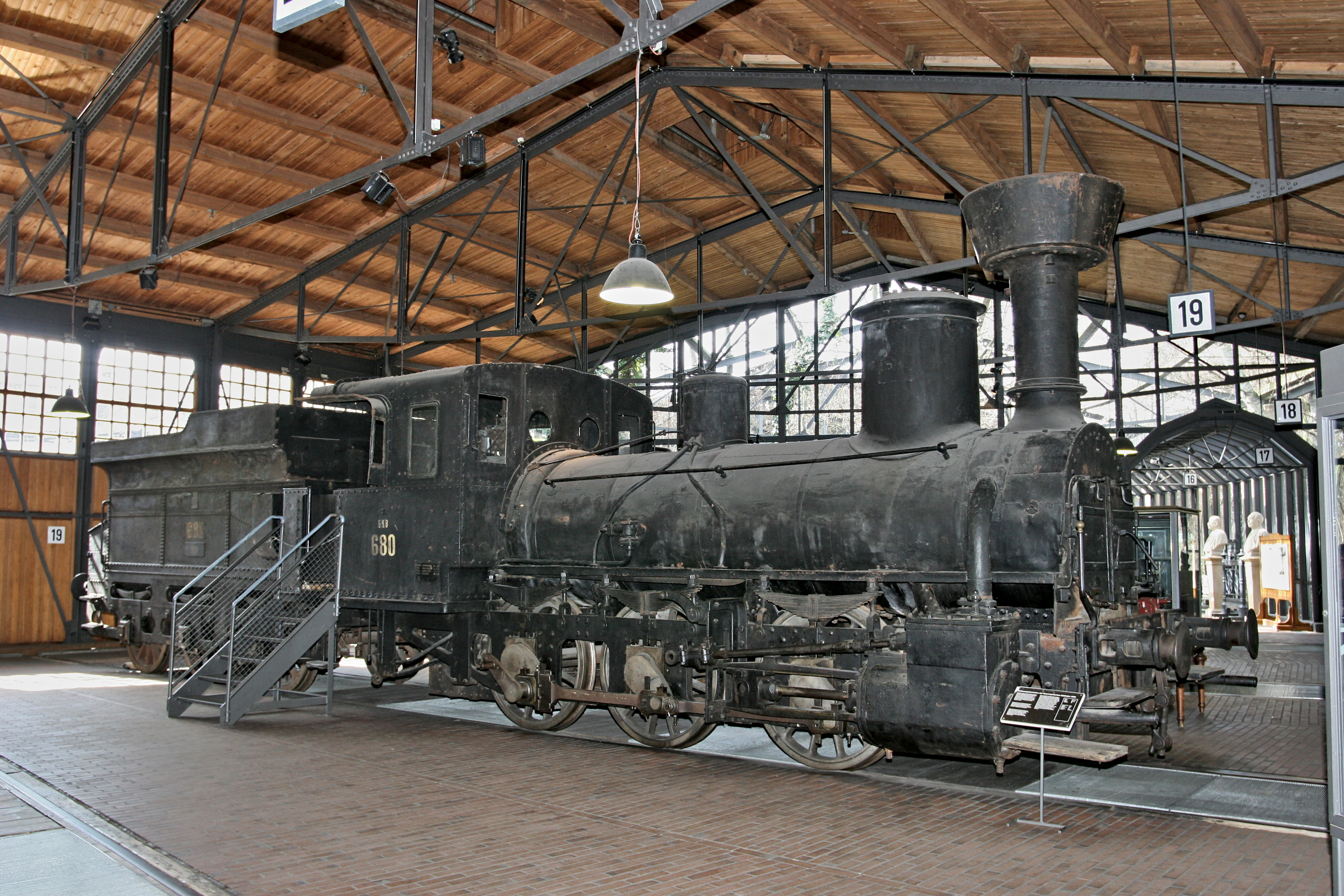
GKB 680 in Berlin.

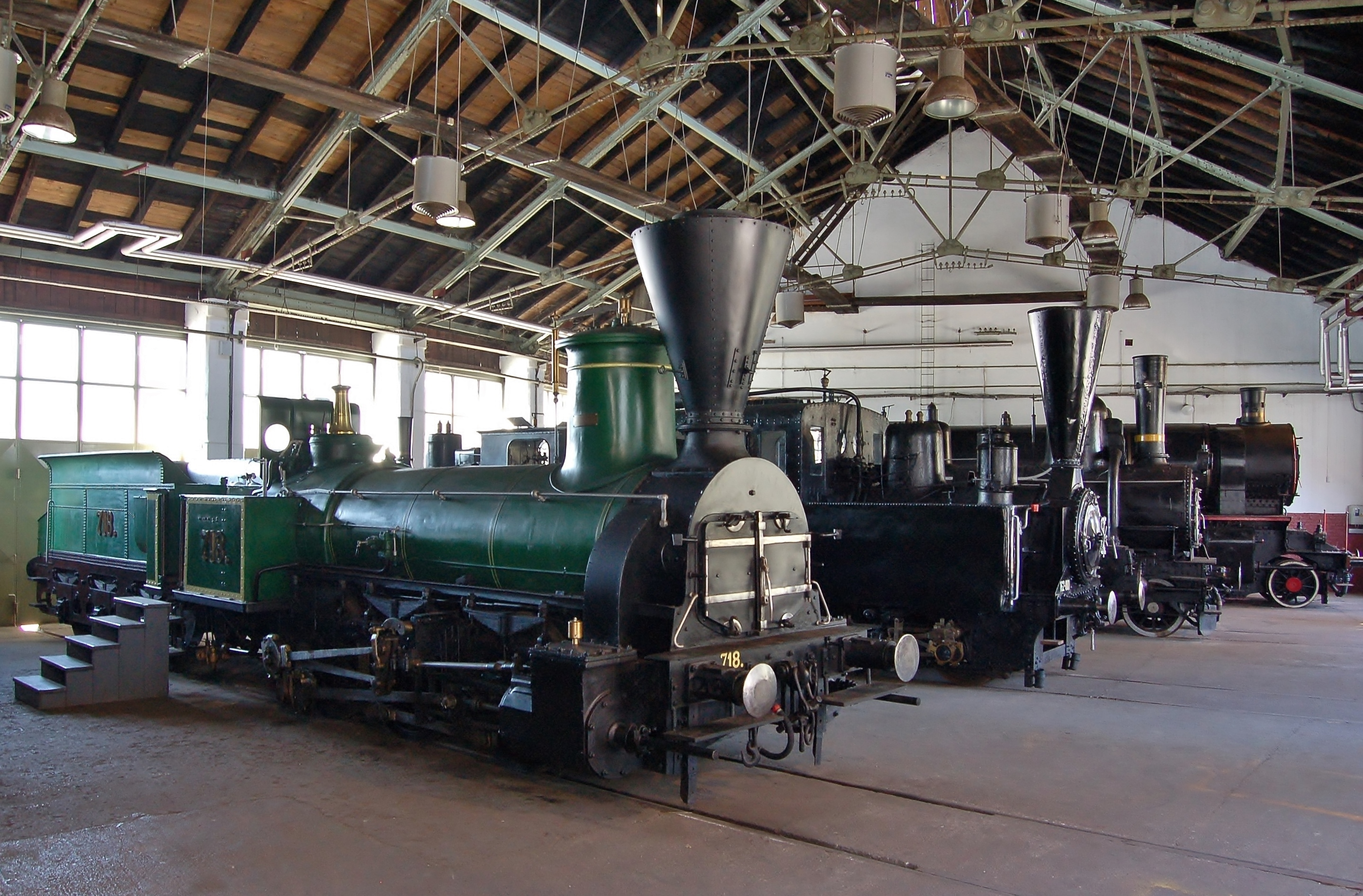
Südbahn 718 in Ljubljana.

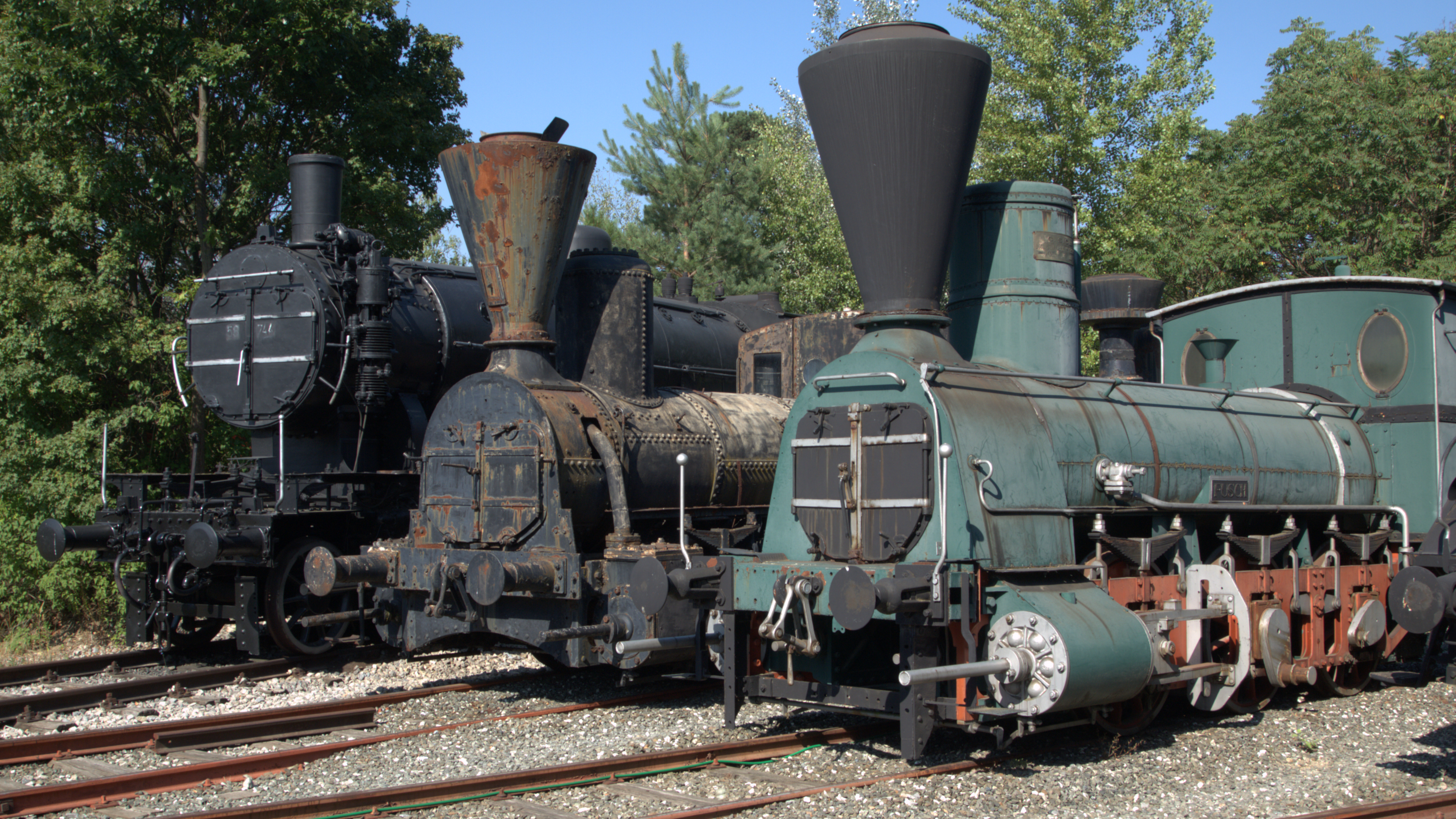
Südbahn 859, behind a Kaiserin Elisabeth Bahn locomotive.

== See also ==
- List of DRG locomotives and railbuses
