= Prussian G 3 =

Class of 0-6-0 steam locomotives

Prussian G 3 DRG Class 53.70–71
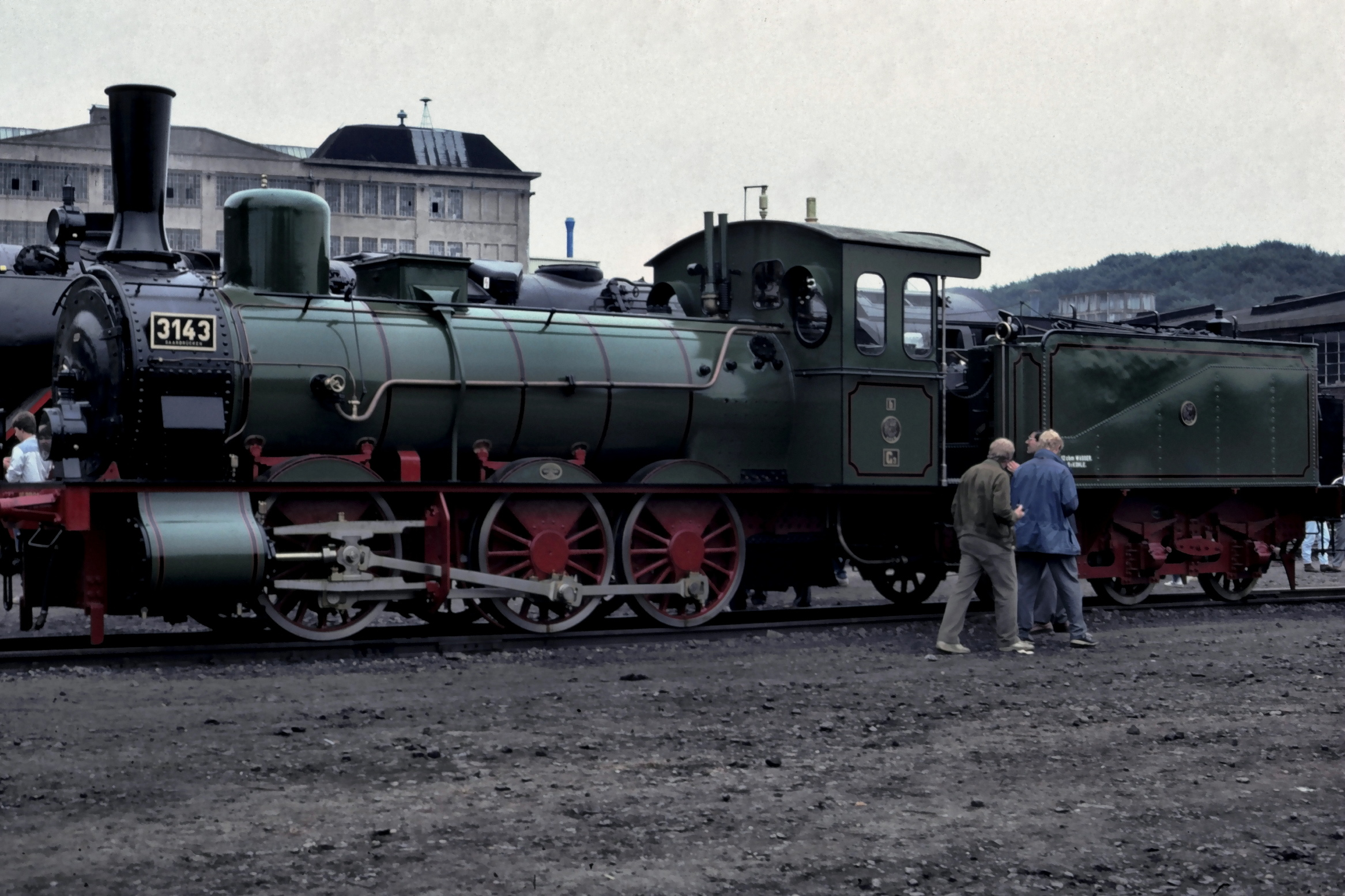
- Prussian G 3 as 3143 Saarbrücken at Bochum-Dahlhausen
Type and origin
- Builder: Berliner Maschinenbau; Borsig; Grafenstaden; Hanomag; Sächsische Maschinenfabrik; Henschel & Sohn; Hohenzollern; Schichau-Werke; Union Giesserei Königsberg; AG Vulcan Stettin; Wöhlert
- Build date: 1877–1896
- Total produced: 2,068
Specifications
- Configuration
  - Whyte: 0-6-0
- Gauge: 1,435 mm (4 ft 8 1/2 in) standard gauge
- Driver dia.: 1,330 mm (52.36 in)
- Length
  - Over beams: 15,176 mm (49 ft 9.5 in)
- Axle load: 12.66 t (12.46 long tons; 13.96 short tons)
- Adhesive weight: 38.0 t (37.4 long tons; 41.9 short tons)
- Service weight: 38.0 t (37.4 long tons; 41.9 short tons)
- Boiler pressure: 10 bar (1,000 kPa; 150 psi)
- Heating surface
  - Firebox: 1.53 m^{2} (16.5 sq ft)
  - Evaporative: 124.8 m^{2} (1,343 sq ft)
- Cylinders: 2
- Cylinder size: 450 mm (17.72 in)
- Piston stroke: 630 mm (24.80 in)
Performance figures
- Maximum speed: 45 km/h (28 mph)
Career
- Numbers: DRG 53 7001–7157

In 1905 the Prussian state railways grouped six-coupled, medium-powered, goods train, steam locomotives into its Class G 3. In addition to standard locomotives, there were also 285 G 3s that were not built to German state railway norms, because they had been built, in most cases, before the foundation of the Prussian state railways.

The G 3 standard locomotives were, in their day the standard goods train locomotives with the Prussian state railways. The first examples were procured in 1877 for the Berlin-Wetzlar railway, known as the Kanonenbahn ('Cannons' line). Other deliveries went to the various state and private Prussian railways, to the Prussian state railways themselves and the Royal Prussian Military Railway. Some of the locomotives had outside valve gear, the majority however had inner gear. The railway division of Frankfurt am Main even classified locomotives with outside valve gear as the G 2. In all some 2,068 G3 locomotives were built.

The G 3 differed from the Prussian G 4.1 in having a lower boiler overpressure of 10 bar (1,000 kPa; 150 psi) as against 12 bar (1,200 kPa; 170 psi) on the G 4.1. From 1886 onwards, only the variant with the higher boiler pressure was built. Several locomotives were later given boilers with the higher boiler pressure and were then classified as G 4.1. One G 3 ended up in the Royal Saxon State Railways on the division of the Berlin-Dresden railway and was designated as a Saxon V with the name Tellkoppe.

In 1923 the Deutsche Reichsbahn envisaged as many as 523 locomotives in its renumbering plan, with the numbers 53 7001 - 7522 and 53 8294 (from Saxony). However, by 1925 only locomotives with the numbers 53 7001 - 7157 were included. They were retired by 1930.

In the Second World War two G 3s came into the Reichsbahn fleet from Poland as numbers 53 7005 and 7006.

Other railway companies also owned Class G 3 engines:

- Grand Duchy of Mecklenburg Friedrich-Franz Railway: 8 units, see the Mecklenburg G 3
- Imperial Railways in Alsace-Lorraine: 37 units as C 21 - C 24, later reclassified as G 3, see the Alsace-Lorraine G 3
- Lübeck-Büchen Railway: 2 units, designated the Class G 2

Class G3 locomotives were equipped with a Prussian pr 3 T 10.5 tender.

One Prussian Class G 3, the Cöln 1100, later Saarbrücken 3143 has been preserved for posterity by the DB Museum in Nuremberg. It had been rebuilt from a Prüfgewicht.

== See also ==
- List of DRG locomotives and railbuses
- List of Prussian locomotives and railbuses
