= Victor Emmanuel Railway =

Defunct Italian railway company

Overview
- Locale: Piedmont, Italy, and Savoy, France, regions
- Dates of operation: 1853–1867
- Successor: Piedmont State Railway and Chemins de fer de Paris à Lyon et à la Méditerranée

Technical
- Track gauge: 1,435 mm (4 ft 8 1/2 in) standard gauge

The Victor Emmanuel Railway (VER) was created on 25 May 1853 by decree of Victor Emmanuel II, King of Sardinia. After 1865 it took the name of Società per le Strade Ferrate Calabro-Sicule (SFCS). In 1867, the Savoy part of the system was transferred to the PLM. Between 1871 and 1873 the Italian part was incorporated into the Società per le Strade Ferrate Meridionali.

== Overview ==
The Victor Emmanuel Railway (VER) was created on 25 May 1853 by decree of Victor Emmanuel II, King of Sardinia. It was authorised to run through Savoy from Culoz, at the boundary with France, via Chambéry and then through Piedmont, from Susa to Turin and onward to Buffalora at the boundary with Austrian territory. The Piedmont section was built by the VER itself. The Savoy section was built by Thomas Brassey and various partners but quickly purchased by the VER.

At the time both Savoy and Piedmont were ruled by Victor Emmanuel who was also Duke of Savoy and soon to be King of Italy. Victor Emmanuel was a constitutional monarch. He and his prime minister Count Camille Cavour were both keen to introduce railways in the interests of modernising and unifying Italy. At the time Italy consisted of small states and many of these were under Austrian control but the King and his Prime Minister hoped to change this.

The Piedmont section of the railway was completed in 1854. The Savoy section was completed to Saint-Jean-de-Maurienne in 1856. In between these two sections lay the Alps. Work on a tunnel began in 1857 and the first traffic ran through it in 1871.

In stages between 1859 and 1861, most of Italy was united under Victor Emmanuel but Savoy and Nice were ceded to France in return for her help. In 1862 the Savoy line was extended to Saint-Michel-de-Maurienne and in 1867 the Savoy part of the system was transferred to the PLM. On the Italian side the line was transferred to the Piedmont State Railway. The Victor Emmanuel Railway Company had served its purpose and the work on the line was continued in partnership between France and Italy.

== The Calabrian-Sicilian lines ==
The Victor Emmanuel Company obtained the concession for the Calabria-Sicilian lines by transferring to the State, under an agreement of 9 July 1863, its Turin - Susa and Turin - Novara railway lines on payment of an annual income of Lire 2,226,000.

The company, chaired by Carlo Laffitte, had been established with entirely French capital. When he obtained the concession for the construction and operation of the Calabrian-Sicilian railway lines, he replaced the Adami and Lemmi Company of the bankers Pietro Augusto Adami and Adriano Lemmi of Livorno.

Adami and Lemmi had obtained the concession for the construction of the railways of southern and insular Italy by decree of the provisional government of Garibaldi on 25 September 1860 but later met with opposition from the new Italian government.

On 27 August 1863 he entrusted the construction of the new railway lines to Messrs Parent, Schaken and Co. which, on 25 September, subcontracted them to a further limited partnership formed by Messrs Vitali, Picard, Charles and Co. which had been established in Paris on 24 August 1862 and whose parenting partners were Parent, Schaken and Co. and the general partners Vitali, Picard, Charles, and Oscar Stevens. The latter company further subcontracted the construction of the railway trunk lines Alcantara - Catania and Catania - Syracuse, and the works of the Catania Central Station to the company Beltrami Gallone and Co.

In 1866, unable to carry on the work for financial reasons, the Victor Emmanuel Company put the Company Vitali, Picard, Charles and Co. into liquidation. On 29 November 1866, the Victor Emmanuel Company made a new agreement with the General Enterprise for the construction of the Calabrian-Sicilian railway lines to continue the works of the Messina - Syracuse and the Palermo - Catania (40 km of the Termini - Lercara trunk line). At the same time the construction of the various sections of the Ionian line (from Taranto to Reggio Calabria via Metaponto) was also carried out, which began in 1866 but ended in 1875 after the assignment to the Società per le Strade Ferrate Meridionali and direct financing by the state.

== The economic collapse ==
The Victor Emmanel company, for various reasons related to the placement of shares on the Parisian market and in a liquidity crisis declared itself unable to continue the work undertaken on the Calabria-Sicilian lines in a further convention of 17 November 1867 with the Government of the Kingdom.

The reason why foreign entrepreneurs (the capital was mostly French) were so interested in new infrastructure was determined by the fact that they could connect to sulphur-rich mining centres. At that time, Sicily was the largest producer in the world of the mineral (a record that was to pass to Texas a few decades later) and it was important to be able to transport it to the ports of embarkation in Palermo, Porto Empedocle, Licata and Catania. Catering for the sulphur traffic sometimes led to tortuous routes and lengthening of the overall layout with negative long-term effects.

At the turn of the 1870s, the construction of the lines had halted, owing to the economic difficulties of the company, and the State had to intervene, with its own capital allocations, and entrusted the works to the Società per le Strade Ferrate Meridionali.

== Routes ==
Lines granted initially

Vittorio Emanuele railway track: concession for a line from Modane to Chambéry with fork to Saint-Genis-d'Aoste / French border and to Aix-les-Bains and Annecy to the border with the canton of Geneva. Built routes:

- Aix-les-Bains-Saint-Jean-de-Maurienne, October 20, 1856
- Saint-Jean-de-Maurienne-Saint-Innocent, 1857
- Saint-Innocent- Rhône (Chanaz), 1858.

Lines acquired prior to the Unification of Italy

- from Turin to Ticino (via Vercelli), 110 km.
- from Turin to Susa, 53 km
- Chivasso-Ivrea, 34 km
- Santhià-Biella, 30 km
- from Turin P.N to Turin P. Susa, 5 km
- Vercelli-Valenza (via Casale), 42 km

Overall, the network operated by the company was 274 km long

Calabrian-Sicilian network

Lines built by Victor Emmanuel Lines of Sicily. The Palermo-Bagheria trunk, inaugurated on 28 April 1863, was the first trunk of the Calabrian-Sicilian network.

- Messina-Catania, 96 km (inauguration 1866-1867)
- Catania-Syracuse, 87 km (inauguration 1869-1871)
- (Palermo) -Termini-Lercara Bassa, 76 km (opened.1863-1870)
- Catania-Leonforte, 70 km (inauguration 1869-1870)

Total Km. 329, built by the Victor Emmanuel company.

Calabria lines

Taranto-Metaponto-Crotone-Reggio Calabria. The works started in 1866 ended in 1875 after the State financed the completion and entrusted it to the Società per le Strade Ferrate Meridionali.

Calabrian-Sicilian network (lines completed or built by the state)

In total 220 km, built in Sicily with state funding (completed after the failure of the Victor Emmanuel company) by the Società per le Strade Ferrate Meridionali.

- Palermo-Porto station, 6 km
- Lercara-Girgenti-Porto Empedocle, 67 km
- Leonforte-Caltanissetta-Canicattì-Licata, 118 km
- Campofranco-Serradifalco, kilometers 29
- Section Caltanissetta Centrale-Canicattì Station, 26 September 1876
- Route Santa Caterina - Santa Caterina Xirbi (Station of Caltanissetta Xirbi from 1927 onwards), 8 April 1878
- Section Canicattì - Favarotta, 23 May 1880
- Section Canicattì - Aragona Caldare, 3 November 1880
- Section Favarotta -Licata, 24 February 1881
- Marianopoli Gallery between Roccapalumba and Xirbi, 1 August 1885

== Rolling stock ==
At the time of the inauguration of the first Sicilian trunk line, Palermo-Bagheria (28 April 1863), there were three steam locomotives named Archimede, Diodoro and Novelli, built by Ansaldo. These machines, numbered SFCS 1-3 were, in 1885, sold to the Rete Mediterranea which numbered them RM 2764–2766. They finally became part of FS Class 113 of the Ferrovie dello Stato.

== Recent information ==
For more recent information see the articles on the Culoz–Modane railway and the Turin–Modane railway.
