= Prussian G 4.1 =

Class of German 0-6-0 steam locomotives

Prussian G 4.1 DRG Class 53.76
Type and origin
- Builder: Grafenstaden; Henschel & Sohn; Hohenzollern; Humboldt; Schichau-Werke; Union Giesserei
- Build date: 1884–1901
- Total produced: 165
Specifications
- Configuration
  - Whyte: 0-6-0
- Driver dia.: 1,340 mm
- Length
  - Over beams: 15,508 mm
- Axle load: 13.47 t
- Adhesive weight: 40.4 t
- Service weight: 40.4 t
- Boiler pressure: 12 bar
- Heating surface
  - Firebox: 1.53 m^{2}
  - Evaporative: 116.00 m^{2}
- Cylinders: 2
- Cylinder size: 450 mm
- Piston stroke: 630 mm
Performance figures
- Maximum speed: 45 km/h
Career
- Numbers: DRG 53 7601–7617

The Prussian Class G 4 were German, six-coupled, goods train, steam locomotives with a boiler pressure of 12 bar, built primarily for the Prussian state railways. Classified by the state railway in 1905, they included 16 locomotives from the railway division of Mainz, that originally came from the Hessian Ludwigsbahn. These earlier locomotives were delivered between 1872 and 1896 and did not meet the Prussian norms.

The later G 4.1 engines were an evolutionary development of the Prussian G 3, but their higher boiler pressure enable a significant increase in power to be achieved. Between 1884 and 1901 some 165 G 4.1 locomotives were delivered; in addition there were numerous conversions of locomotives which originally had a 10 bar boiler pressure. However, not all of them were designated as G 4 engines.

In 1923 the Deutsche Reichsbahn planned to incorporate 92 of these locomotives in its renumbering plan as 53 7601 - 7692. But by 1925 only locomotive numbers 53 7601 - 7617 were included. They were retired by 1930.

The Lübeck-Büchen Railway (LBE) also owned two locomotives of this class, built in 1892 and 1893, but they classified them as G 3s and had retired them by 1923.

The Class G 4.1 engines were coupled to Prussian pr 3 T 12 tenders.

== See also ==
- List of DRG locomotives and railbuses
- List of Prussian locomotives and railbuses
