= FS Class 170 =

FS Class 170 earlier RM 1501-1573 earlier SFAI
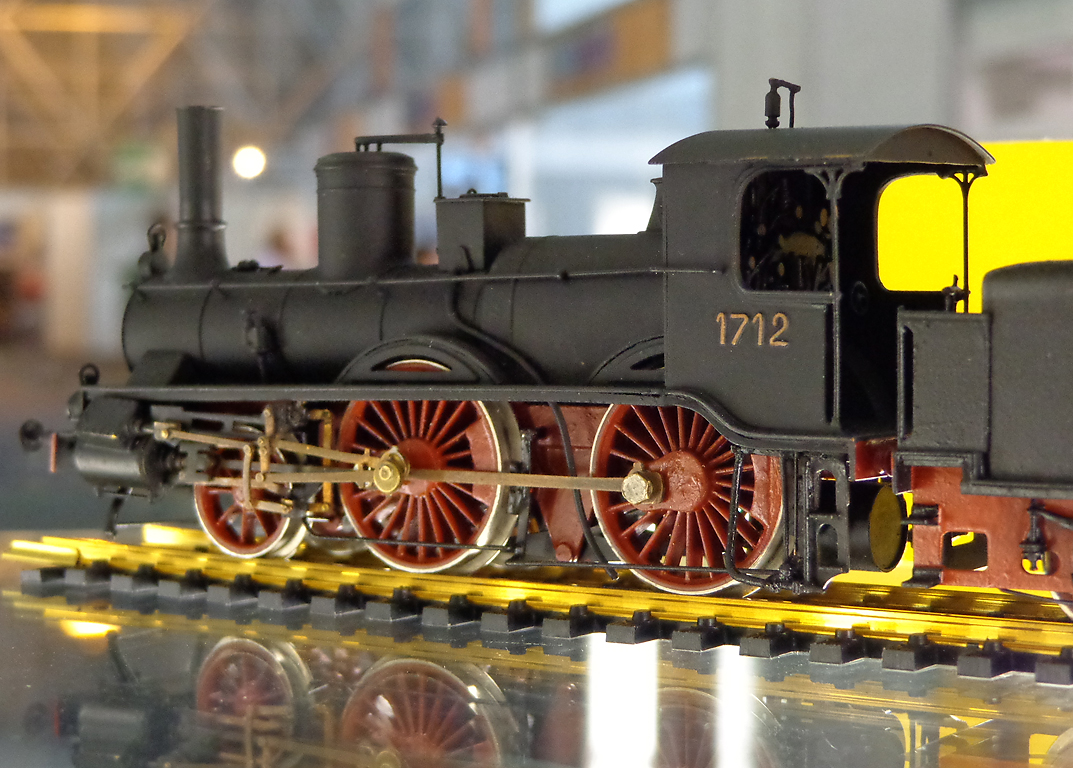
- Model of an FS Class 170 locomotive
Type and origin
- Power type: Steam
- Builder: Koechlin, Maffei, Société Franco-Belge
- Build date: 1873–1889
- Total produced: 73
Specifications
- Configuration
  - Whyte: 2-4-0
- Gauge: 1,435 mm (4 ft 8 1/2 in)
- Leading dia.: 1.383 m (54.4 in)
- Driver dia.: 2.03 m (80 in)
- Length: 15.716 m (51.56 ft)
- Axle load: 13.9 or 14.9 tonnes (13.7 or 14.7 long tons; 15.3 or 16.4 short tons)
- Loco weight: 43.4 or 43.7 tonnes (42.7 or 43.0 long tons; 47.8 or 48.2 short tons)
- Fuel type: Coal
- Boiler pressure: 10 bar (1.0 MPa; 150 psi)
- Heating surface: 96.6 or 100.75 m^{2} (1,039.8 or 1,084.5 sq ft)
- Cylinders: 2 outside
- Cylinder size: 430 mm × 620 mm (17 in × 24 in)
- Valve gear: Gooch
Performance figures
- Maximum speed: 80 km/h (50 mph)
- Tractive effort: 4,070 or 4,260 kgf (9,000 or 9,400 lbf)

FS Class 170 was a class of 2-4-0 steam locomotives acquired by Italian State Railways (FS) from Rete Mediterranea (RM) on nationalization in 1905.

== History ==
These locomotives were received by the Mediterranean Network in 1885 following the division of earlier railways between three major networks. They were locomotives for fast passenger trains and most came from the Società per le strade ferrate dell'Alta Italia (SFAI). They were all of foreign construction. The oldest were delivered from Koechlin of Mulhouse between 1873 and 1874 and accounted for more than half of the total quantity. The subsequent orders, made by RM, were to Maffei of Munich who delivered them between 1884 and 1889. Eight locomotives were built by the Société Franco-Belge between 1888 and 1889. They were finally acquired by FS in 1905 on nationalization. In the FS locomotive list, at 31 December 1914, 60 units were registered. They were divided into two groups with different technical characteristics and some functional and aesthetic variations.

== Technical details ==
The locomotive was built with a 2-4-0 wheel arrangement, with very large 2.03 mm (0.080 in) diameter wheels and a front axle with 8 mm (0.31 in) side-play allowed. It was typical of the passenger locomotives of the time. It used saturated steam and had two outside cylinders with simple expansion. The boiler pressure was 10 bar (1.0 MPa; 150 psi). A three-axle tender of total mass 29 tonnes (29 long tons; 32 short tons) (26 tonnes [26 long tons; 29 short tons] in the second group) was coupled to the locomotives. The water capacity was 10 m^{3} (2,200 imp gal; 2,600 US gal) and the coal capacity was 3.5 tonnes (3.4 long tons; 3.9 short tons) (3 tonnes [3.0 long tons; 3.3 short tons] in the second group). All locomotives were equipped with automatic compressed air brake equipment. Some machines were also equipped with a steam brake while only no. 1715 had a proportional compressed air brake. All the machines were able to provide steam heating for passenger carriages.

== Names ==
- Locomotive 170.047, ex Rete Mediterranea 1547, Caterina Cornaro
- Locomotive 170.066, ex Rete Mediterranea 1566, Ildegonda
