= Società per le Strade Ferrate Meridionali =

Defunct Italian railway company

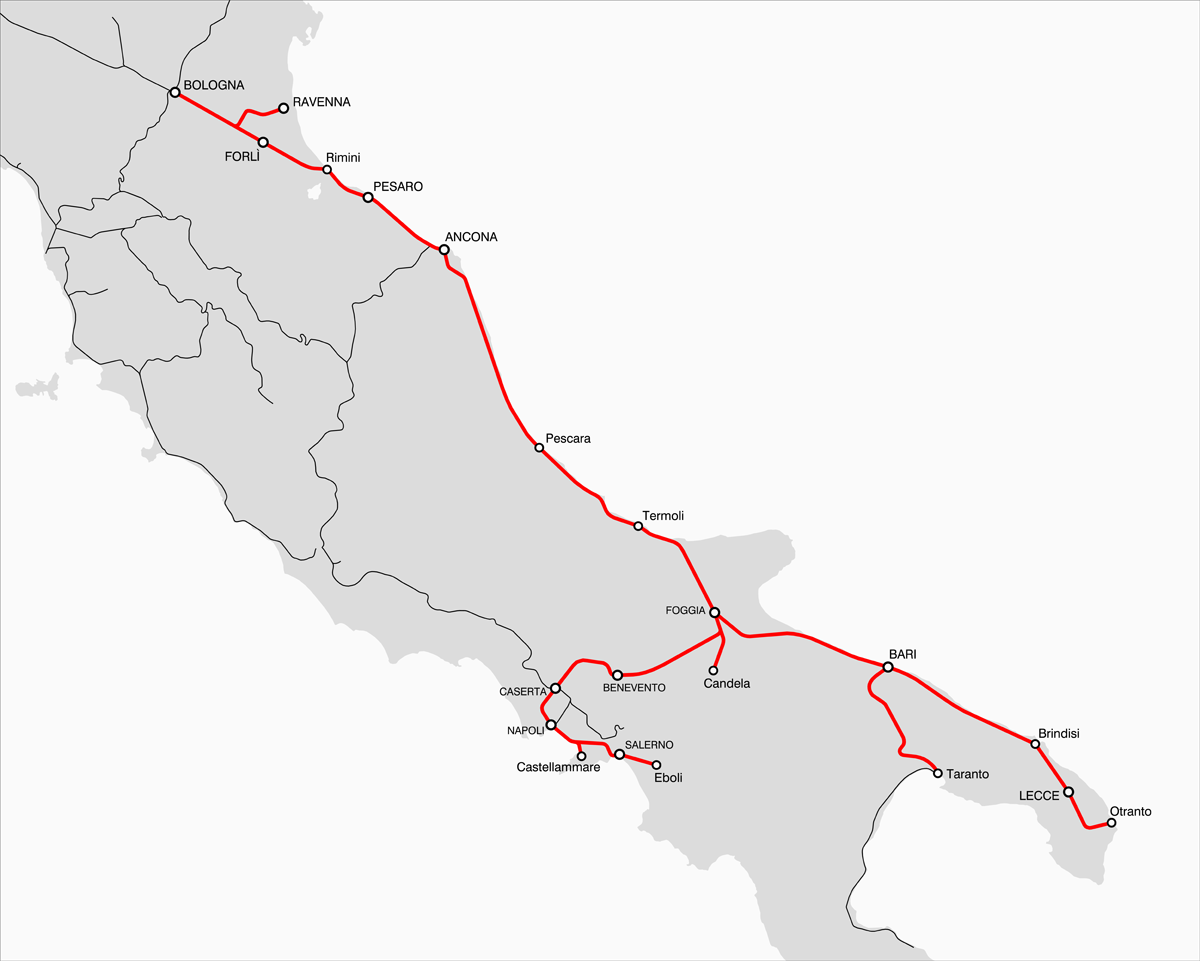
SFM lines at 1.1.1873

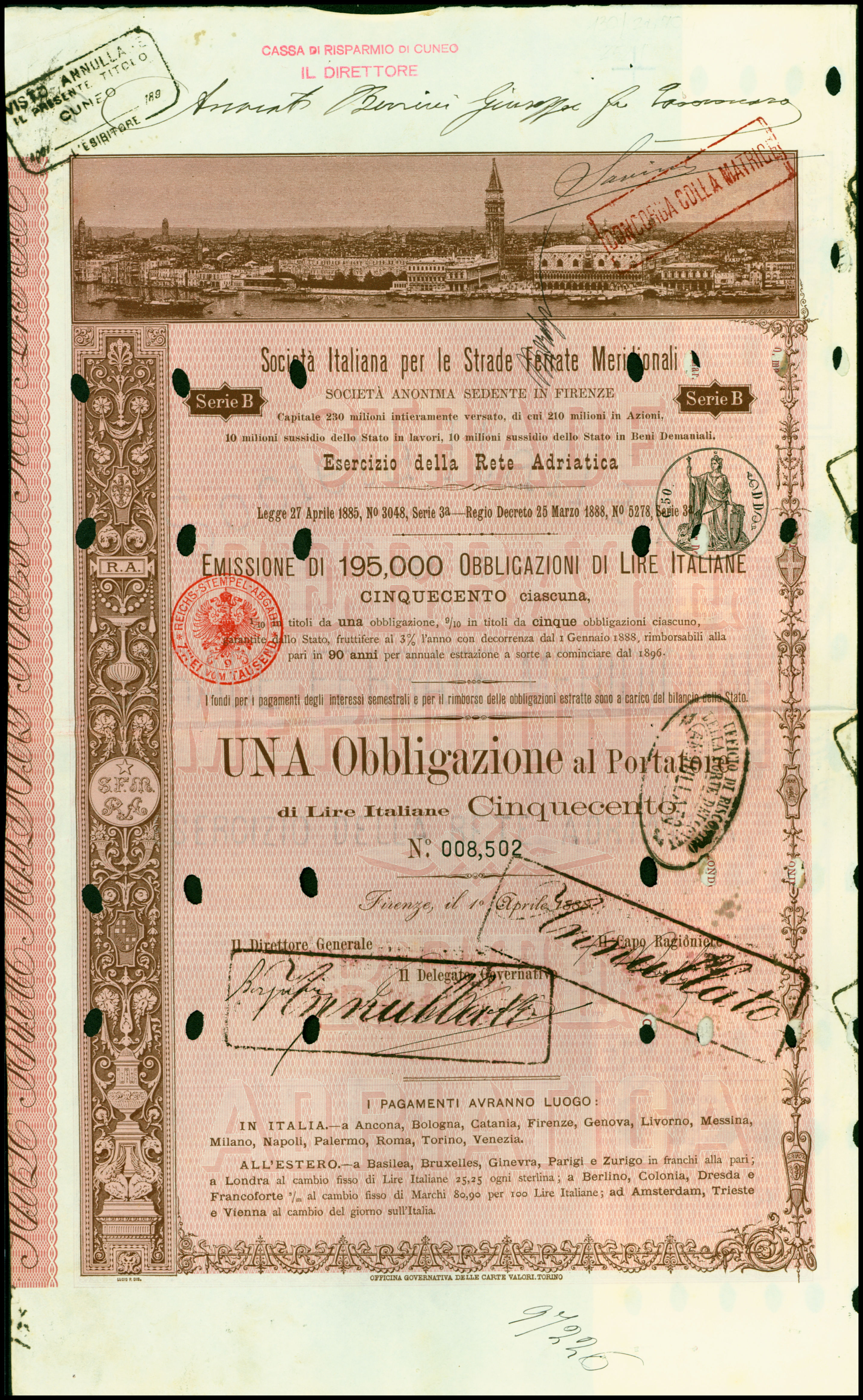
Bond of the Soc. per le Strade Ferrate Meridionali, issued 1. April 1888

The Società per le Strade Ferrate Meridionali (Italian: Company for the Southern Railways, SFM) was an Italian railway company established in 1862. In 1885 it took the control of the so-called "Rete Adriatica" (Adriatic Network, RA). In 1905 the Rete Adriatica was absorbed by Ferrovie dello Stato (FS), one year later the FS acquired all the lines of the SFM.

== History ==
The Southern Railways was established in 1862 to build a railway from Ancona to Brindisi. Although this was originally a Rothchild's promotion, it was founded as an Italian company led by Count Pietro Bastogi of Livorno. By 1865 it completed its line to Brindisi and it opened a branch from Bari to Taranto in 1868. In the reorganisation of Italian railway concessions on 1 July 1865, it acquired the line from Bologna to Ancona and the branch from Castel Bolognese to Ravenna from the General Roman Railway Company.

== Rete Adriatica ==
In the reorganisation of 1 July 1885 it acquired the lines of the Società per le strade ferrate dell'Alta Italia to the east of Milan, some lines from the Società per le Strade Ferrate Romane (Roman Railways) connecting Florence and Ancona to Rome and some branches of the old Società per le Strade Ferrate Calabro-Sicule in Calabria, now connecting to the Rete Mediterranea. On 1 July 1905 it was nationalised and absorbed into the Ferrovie dello Stato.

== Rolling stock ==
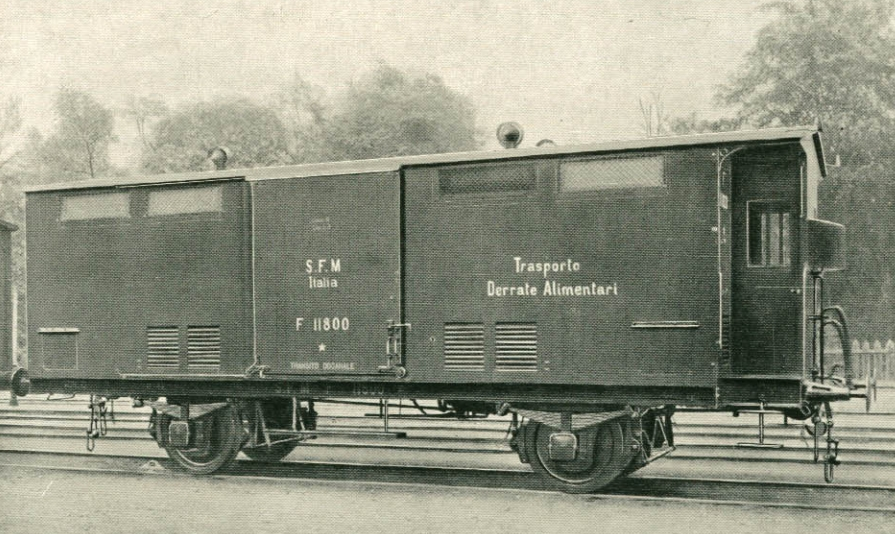
Covered goods van

In 1882, the company owned 231 locomotives, 645 passenger cars and 3965 freight cars.
