= Rete Adriatica =

Defunct Italian railway network

Rete Adriatica (RA) defines the network of railway lines assigned to the Società per le Strade Ferrate Meridionali under the Conventions of 1885. This network was merged into the Italian State Railways (FS) in 1905.

== History ==
First class passenger car, built 1885 by SIG Combibloc Group.

Following the conclusions of a parliamentary commission of inquiry, established to examine the serious problems of management of the Italian private railway companies, 23 on April 1884, agreements were stipulated between the State and three large private companies, for a duration of 60 years, and were approved on 6 March 1885.

The agreements divided the Italian railways in a longitudinal direction with respect to the peninsula and assigned to the Società per le Strade Ferrate Meridionali (SFM) the tracks of most of the railway network bordering on the Adriatic. This included lines east of Milan, and in Veneto and Emilia-Romagna, and totalled 4,379 km. The network was called Rete Adriatica (Adriatic Network). To obtain the concession of the Adriatic Network, the company paid the sum of 115 million lire to the State. The Statistical Yearbook of 1898, published by the Ministry of Agriculture, Industry and Commerce, indicates that in December 1896 the Adriatic Network had increased to 5,602 km. Some strategic sections and some large stations were operated in common with the Rete Mediterranea (Mediterranean Network), among the most important being Piacenza - Parma and Milan - Como.

In March 1897 the Adriatic Network owned 1111 steam locomotives, 3158 coaches, 665 baggage cars and 20532 goods wagons.

== Nationalization ==
The operation of the Adriatic Network lines by the SFM ceased on 1 July 1905 when the Italian State Railways (FS) took over. Both the nationalization by the State of the lines owned by the company and the concomitant liquidation of the concession of the Network were implemented the following year, after the approval of the law of 15 July 1906, no. 324.
