= FS Class 851 =

Class of Italian steam locomotives

FS 851
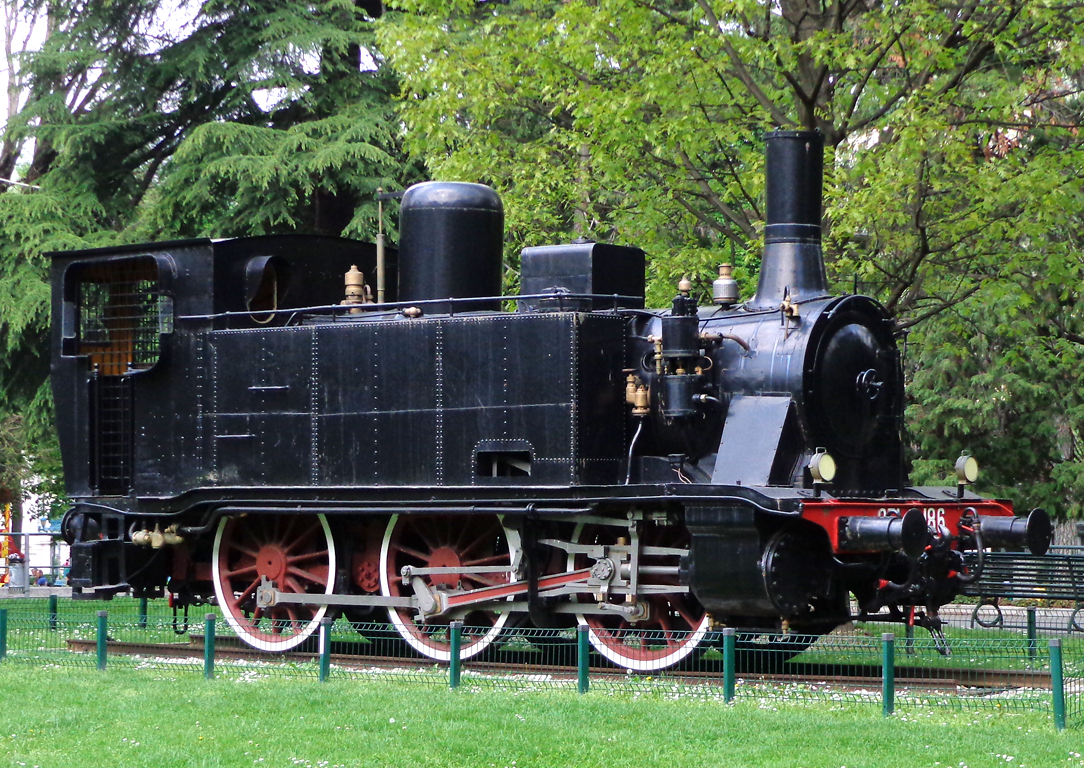
- FS locomotive 851.186 on display in Como's public gardens, May 2013
Type and origin
- Power type: Steam
- Builder: Gio. Ansaldo & C. (25); Società Italiana Ernesto Breda (32); Maffei (16); CM de Saronno (79); Officine Meccaniche (58)
- Build date: 1898-1911
- Total produced: 207
Specifications
- Configuration
  - Whyte: 0-6-0T
  - UIC: C n2t
- Wheel diameter: 1,510 mm (4 ft 11 1/2 in)
- Wheelbase
  - Axle spacing (Asymmetrical): 2,000 mm (6 ft 6 3/4 in); 2,000 mm (6 ft 6 3/4 in)
  - Engine: 4,000 mm (13 ft 1 1/2 in)
- Length
  - Over headstocks: 7,850 mm (25 ft 9 in)
  - Over buffers: 9,000 mm (29 ft 6 3/8 in)
- Height: 4,225 mm (13 ft 10 3/8 in)
- Axle load: 14.7 tonnes (14.5 long tons; 16.2 short tons)
- Loco weight: 43 or 44 tonnes (42 or 43 long tons; 47 or 49 short tons)
- Boiler
  - Pitch: 2,140 mm (7 ft 1/4 in)
- Boiler pressure: 12 kgf/cm^{2} (11.8 bar; 171 psi)
- Heating surface
  - Firebox: 1.53 m^{2} (16.5 sq ft)
- Superheater
  - Heating area: 83.3 or 94.16 m^{2} (896.6 or 1,013.5 sq ft)
- Cylinders: Two, outside
- Cylinder size: 430 mm × 580 mm (16 15/16 in × 22 13/16 in)
Performance figures
- Maximum speed: 65 km/h (40 mph)
- Power output
  - Continuous: 400 PS (294 kW; 395 hp)
- Tractive effort: 6,950 kgf (15,300 lbf)

Class 851 locomotives were a class of steam locomotives of the Italian State Railways (FS).

They were designed and built by the Adriatic Network (RA) as machines for line service. In 1905, together with the locomotives of the classes FS 290, 600 and 870 ex-RA, they were included among those that the FS deemed worthy of further orders pending the completion of the designs of new classes suitable to cope with the development of passenger and freight traffic resulting from nationalization. (Note: In the period of the "second Conventions," between 1885 and 1905, passenger traffic on the network later merged into the FS increased from 1 782 000 to 4 575 000 pkm. In the same two decades, freight traffic increased from 1 695 000 to 4 997 000 tkm. In the decade to 1915 passenger traffic increased to 5 028 000 pkm and freight traffic to 8 874 000 tkm. Cf. Gennaro Trotta, Alcuni elementi statistici di attività ferroviaria italiana, in Ingegneria ferroviaria, 16 (1961), n. 7-8, p. 775.)

The advent of Class 940 locomotives relegated them to the role of shunting locomotives. With a geographical distribution complementary to that of class 835, these "interesting machines" served until the end of the steam traction era in Italy in the 1970s.

== Background ==
At the end of the nineteenth century, the completion of the Sulmona-Isernia and Candela-Potenza lines and the increase in train compositions and passenger car masses determined the management of the Adriatic Network to the design of a new group of steam locomotives intended to support, by placing at the head or rear of the trainsets, the tractive effort (Note: This is a force measured at the periphery of the drive wheels or at the draw hook of vehicles. With other elements, it allows the determination of the towable load.) of the titular machines especially on the steep pass lines. Therefore tank locomotives with good adherent mass, power and speed and sufficient range for those types of services were studied. (Note: For service on secondary lines with little traffic, the type of C arrangement tank locomotives at the time was the type preferred by engineers in charge of networks "all over Europe." Cf. Renzo Pocaterra, Treni, Novara, De Agostini Libri, 2011, p. 72.)

Incorporated into the new RA 270 class and delivered in 1898 in an initial subgroup of 18 units, they were destined for the aforementioned Sulmona-Isernia and Candela-Potenza lines and the Terni-Ancona section of the Rome-Ancona and Pescara-Avezzano section of the Rome-Pescara.

Good operating results prompted the construction of a second subgroup in two separate lots of 18 and 24 units, which were delivered between 1900–01 and 1904.

The FS, which took over from the previous private companies in 1905, had to quickly set up plans for the development and renewal of their fleet. (Note: "It must be acknowledged that the three large private networks, after 20 years of operation, at the termination of the Conventions returned to the state an organization in full fervor of renewal, but with scanty resources and, technically, no longer responsive to the needs of traffic that had instead taken on an unforeseen development." Cf. Corbellini, p. 341).) While the Study and Testing Office of the Traction Service was designing new construction types while also taking up earlier studies, it was decided to commission more units of the pre-existing types possibly with modifications suggested by the practice of operation (FS classes 290, 320, 600, 630, 670, 750, 830, 851, 870, 904 and 910; in addition, they wanted to test U.S. construction techniques by ordering the 20 machines of classes 666 and 720). Among them, former RA 270s were chosen, which formed the 851 FS class. (Note: In 1906, the FS had 287 C arrangement tank locomotives, of which some (FS Class 815) were built in 1853-1854. All, with the exception of 898, were designed for line services. Cf. Briano, p. 138).) Construction continued until 1911 for a total of 207 units, which from 1917 were numbered 851,001-207.

== Project ==
The design of RA 270 was developed by the Florence Study Office of the Adriatic Network and in some details shows a relationship to the contemporary 350 bis RA class, later FS 290.

As typical of the "Florentine school," (Note: Having passed the first phase of the development of the Italian railway system, during which locomotives were purchased from the Italian and foreign manufacturing industries that had carried out the relevant designs, the two major railway companies began the independent design of their own vehicles. In particular, the Società Italiana per le Strade Ferrate Meridionali in 1880 established its own Office of Studies in Florence, which was inherited by the Adriatic Network and became the headquarters of the Material and Traction Service of the State Railways, aggregating to itself the staff and expertise of the corresponding Office established in Turin by the Società per le Strade Ferrate dell'Alta Italia in 1872, later acquired by the Mediterranean Network. Cf. Piro e Vicuna, p. 28).) simplicity of design was favored, especially of the engine and distribution mechanism. This choice generated significant economy of operation, which also had among its consequences a marked appreciation by the engine and shop personnel.

According to engineer Bruno Bonazzelli the RA 270, later named FS 851, can be considered the improved version of the RA 250, later named FS 827 class locomotives. The opinion is shared by Giovanni Cornolò and Gian Guido Turchi, who point out the common destination for reinforcement service, at the head or tail end of trains, on the steepest ramps of trans-Apennine lines.

== Features ==
For the services expected to be performed on mountain lines with gradients of up to 28 per thousand and numerous trunks armed with rails having a mass of 27 kilograms per metre (54 lb/yd), a running gear (UIC) C was chosen with wheels of 1,510 mm (59 in) diameter, spacing between extreme wheelsets of 4,000 mm (13 ft), all adhering mass, and a modest load per wheelset (14.3 and 14.4 t [14.1 and 14.2 long tons; 15.8 and 15.9 short tons] in the first subgroup and 14.6 and 14.7 t [14.4 and 14.5 long tons; 16.1 and 16.2 short tons] in the second subgroup).

In the machines of the second subgroup, the consideration of the possibility of frequent stops for refueling prompted the reduction of water stocks from 5,700 to 5,000 L (1,300 to 1,100 imp gal; 1,500 to 1,300 US gal) and coal stocks from 1.4 to 1.2 t (1.4 to 1.2 long tons; 1.5 to 1.3 short tons) (the increase in overall mass was due to the toughening of the chassis).

The steam generator was of the normal type in use at the time of design. The combustor had a grate with a surface area of 1.53 m^{2} (16.5 sq ft). The cylindrical body of the boiler was 4.41 m (14.5 ft) long (including the smoke chamber) and contained 213 kettle tubes, 3.2 m (10 ft) long, between the furnace plate and the smoke chamber plate.

The boiler, which contained 2.9 m^{3} (640 imp gal; 770 US gal) of water, had a heating surface (Note: Through which heat was transmitted to the water to be vaporized.) of 94.16 m^{2} (1,013.5 sq ft), including 87.8 m^{2} (945 sq ft) in the kettle tubes and 6.36 m^{2} (68.5 sq ft) in the part of the furnace above the grate ("furnace ceiling"). It generated saturated vapor with an output of 4,700 kg (10,400 lb) per hour.

The engine was single-expansion, (Note: In a simple-expansion engine, the steam that drives the cylinders is introduced into them once and then expelled directly into the atmosphere or a condenser. The expansion phase lowers the temperature of the steam, resulting in cooling of the cylinder with each stroke and poor efficiency of the thermodynamic cycle (Rankine).) with twin outer cylinders having a bore of 430 mm (17 in) and piston stroke of 580 mm (23 in), Walschaerts mechanism, and slide valves. (Note: In slide valves, a drawer-shaped device, controlled by the connecting rod, opens and closes the steam introduction and exhaust channels in the engine cylinder.)

Like the FS 290 locomotives, all 851s were equipped with a variable escapement of the "pear" type. (Note: The variable escapement allowed the engineer to change the forced draft by adjusting it to operating conditions and was typical of locomotives intended to run on lines with a rough profile. The "pear" or "cone" type received its name from the shape of the part, made of cast iron, that increased or decreased the diameter of the escapement column. Cf. Abate, pp. 89–91), Carpignano, p. 58).)

The normal power was 294 kW (394 hp) at 30 km/h (19 mph) (this explains the later use in shunting: in steam traction the power, and thus the load that can be pulled, is maximum in the middle range of developable speeds).

The first subgroup was equipped with the vacuum brake. Later, in compliance with legislative requirements, first the newly built machines and then the others were equipped with the Westinghouse type automatic and proportional air brake, (Note: Introduced in Italy beginning in 1887. Cf. Damen et al., p. 10).) with installation of the compressor (single stage) on the right side. (Note: The Adriatic Network had maintained and extended the use of the Smith-Hardy vacuum brake already used by the Strade Ferrate Alta Italia and Strade Ferrate Romane. From 1891 onward the General Inspectorate of Railroads, an organ of the Ministry of Public Works responsible for supervising the work of railway companies, first suggested and then decreed its replacement by the Westinghouse brake, whose use was generalized from 1905 by the FS. Cf. Maurizio Panconesi, Il freno Westinghouse. A 100 anni dalla scomparsa del suo inventore (1846-1914), in La tecnica professionale, n.s. 21 (2014), n. 1, pp. 38-46.)

All machines were arranged to deliver steam for heating passenger cars. (Note: Steam heating was adopted by Italian railway companies from the late 19th century. It used a pipe fed by steam generated by the locomotive or a special vehicle (called a "heating wagon"), which circulated in radiators arranged in passenger compartments and corridors. It disappeared beginning in the 1930s, replaced by electric heating (with power supplied by the locomotive or a motor-generator vehicle). Cf. Gian Guido Turchi, Caldo sui treni, in I treni 15 (1994), n. 146, pp. 17-25, with a note by Erminio Mascherpa, I non facili primi passi del REC, ibidem, p. 23, P. Franchetto, M. Cerutti, I carri riscaldatori, in Tutto treno, 7 (1994), n. 66, pp. 12-17, with a note by Angelo Nascimbene, L'esperienza di un capodeposito istruttore del DL di Torino Smistamento dagli anni cinquanta fino agli ultimi servizi e ai carri "Vir", ibidem, pp. 16-17.)

The machines of the first delivery had an open cab on the rear side, then enclosed with a wall equipped with three large windows, the middle one of which could be opened to increase ventilation in the cab.

The paint schemes adopted were those normally used first by the RA and then by the FS. The scheme, in gray, used provisionally for photographic shots for the purpose of documenting the activities of the manufacturing industries was applied to some.

=== Performance ===
The performance assigned by the FS Material and Traction Service and published in the General Preface to the Service Schedule (PGOS) was the same for classes 851 and 981 (source:):

Speed categories	Degrees of line performance																														
Speed categories	1	2	3	4	5	6	7	8	9	10	11	12	13	14	15	16	17	18	19	20	21	22	23	24	25	26	27	28	29	30	31
I Special	-	-	-	-	-	-	-	-	120	120	110	110	110	110	100	100	90	80	80	70	70	70	70	70	60	60	60	50	50	50	50
I	-	-	-	140	140	140	140	140	130	130	120	120	120	120	120	110	110	100	90	80	80	80	80	80	70	60	60	50	50	50	50
II	-	-	-	150	150	150	150	150	140	140	130	130	130	130	130	120	120	110	100	90	90	90	90	90	80	70	70	60	60	60	60
III	230	210	200	180	180	170	170	170	160	160	150	150	150	150	140	130	130	120	110	100	100	100	100	100	90	80	80	70	70	70	60
IV	260	250	250	230	220	210	200	190	180	180	170	160	160	160	150	140	140	130	120	110	110	110	110	110	100	90	80	70	70	70	60
V	330	310	290	260	250	230	230	220	210	200	190	180	180	170	160	150	150	140	140	130	120	120	120	120	110	100	90	80	80	70	60
VI	390	380	360	330	290	270	260	250	240	230	210	200	190	190	180	170	160	150	140	130	120	120	120	120	110	100	90	80	80	70	60
VII	490	440	410	380	350	320	300	290	280	270	240	220	210	200	200	190	170	160	150	140	140	140	130	130	120	110	100	90	80	70	60
VIII	530	500	450	420	390	360	340	330	310	290	280	260	230	220	210	200	190	180	170	150	150	150	150	140	130	120	110	100	90	80	70
IX	620	590	540	500	460	440	400	390	360	330	310	300	280	260	250	240	220	200	190	180	170	160	160	150	140	130	120	110	100	90	80
X	750	680	630	590	550	510	480	450	420	380	360	340	320	300	270	260	240	220	200	200	190	170	160	150	140	130	120	110	100	90	80
The table contains the maximum permissible loads for different speed categories of trains according to the performance grades of the railway lines. The values are expressed in tons.

== Construction ==
The locomotives were built from 1898 to 1911 in a total of 207 units. Numbered first RA 2701-2760, then FS 8511-8699 and 85290-86307, from 1917 they assumed the final numbering FS 851.001-207, practically applied in 1919 (former RA 2732-2755 became FS 851. 001-024; former RA 2701-2712, 2718-2731, 2713–2717 and 2756-2760, following the order of delivery, became FS 851.079-114).

Four other machines corresponding to the 851 class were built in 1924 by Ansaldo for the Siena-Buonconvento-Monte Antico railway, which was bought back by the FS in 1956. The three machines taken over (unit 02 had been damaged during the World War and was scrapped in 1947) had the numbering 851.01 and 03-04 and retained it until their decommissioning that took place between 1958 and 1961 (Peter Michael Kalla-Bishop mentions the possibility, which did not materialize, of their renumbering as FS 851.208-210).

In addition, the Società Anonima Strade Ferrate Sovvenzionate (SFS), operating the Caudina Valley Railway (Benevento-Cancello line), had six locomotives identical to FS 851 built by the Officine Meccaniche in 1911.

The FS divided its 851s into two subgroups: the first included those built in 1898 which, in 1917, received the new numbering 851.079-090 and 105-109 and the second all others.

The breakdown of units among the manufacturers and the sequence of numbering is in the following table. The numbering of former RA 2701-2772 was maintained by the reconstituted Strade Ferrate Meridionali (SFM), which took over the operation of the Adriatic Network between 1903 and 1906 pending its nationalization in 1906.

RA Serial Numbers	FS Serial Numbers (1905)	FS Serial Numbers (1919)	Manufacturers	Delivery dates
2732–2734	8511–8513	851.001–003	Ansaldo	1901
2735–2740	8514–8519	851.004–009	Costruzioni Meccaniche di Saronno	1904
2741–2750	8520–8529	851.010–019	Breda	1904
2751–2755	8530–8534	851.020–024	Breda	1904
2761–2772, SFM same numbers.	8535–8546	851.025–036	Officine Meccaniche, Milan	1905
	8547–8572	851.037–062	Officine Meccaniche, Milan	1907
	8573–8588	851.063–078	Maffei	1906
2701–2712, SFM same numbers	8589–8600	851.079–090	Breda	1898
2713–2718, SFM same numbers	8601–8606	851.091–096	Ansaldo	1898
2719–2730, SFM same numbers	8607–8618	851.097–108	Ansaldo	1900
2731, SFM same number	8619	851.109	Ansaldo	1901
2756–2760, SFM same numbers	8620–8624	851.110–114	Breda	1904
	8625–8648	851.025–036	Costruzioni Meccaniche di Saronno	1908
	8649–8668	851.139–158	Officine Meccaniche, Naples	1909
	8669–8698	851.159–188	Costruzioni Meccaniche di Saronno	1908
	8699, 85290–85307	851.189–207	Costruzioni Meccaniche di Saronno	1910

Units 851,139-158 were built by Officine Meccaniche in their Naples plant. (Note: Around 1906, as a result of the special law for Naples, the Milanese company Officine Meccaniche (formerly Miani, Silvestri, Grondona), with the help of Italian Credit, took over the facilities of the Hawthorn-Guppy Neapolitan Industrial Company. Cf. Luigi De Rosa, Iniziativa e capitale straniero nell'industria metalmeccanica del Mezzogiorno 1840-1904, Napoli, Giannini, 1968, pp. 219-221.)

According to Briano in 1906 there were 72 units in service out of a total of 409 tank locomotives in the FS fleet. Gian Guido Turchi, on the other hand, writes that in 1906 there were 88 units in operation, plus another 26 under construction.

== Modifications ==
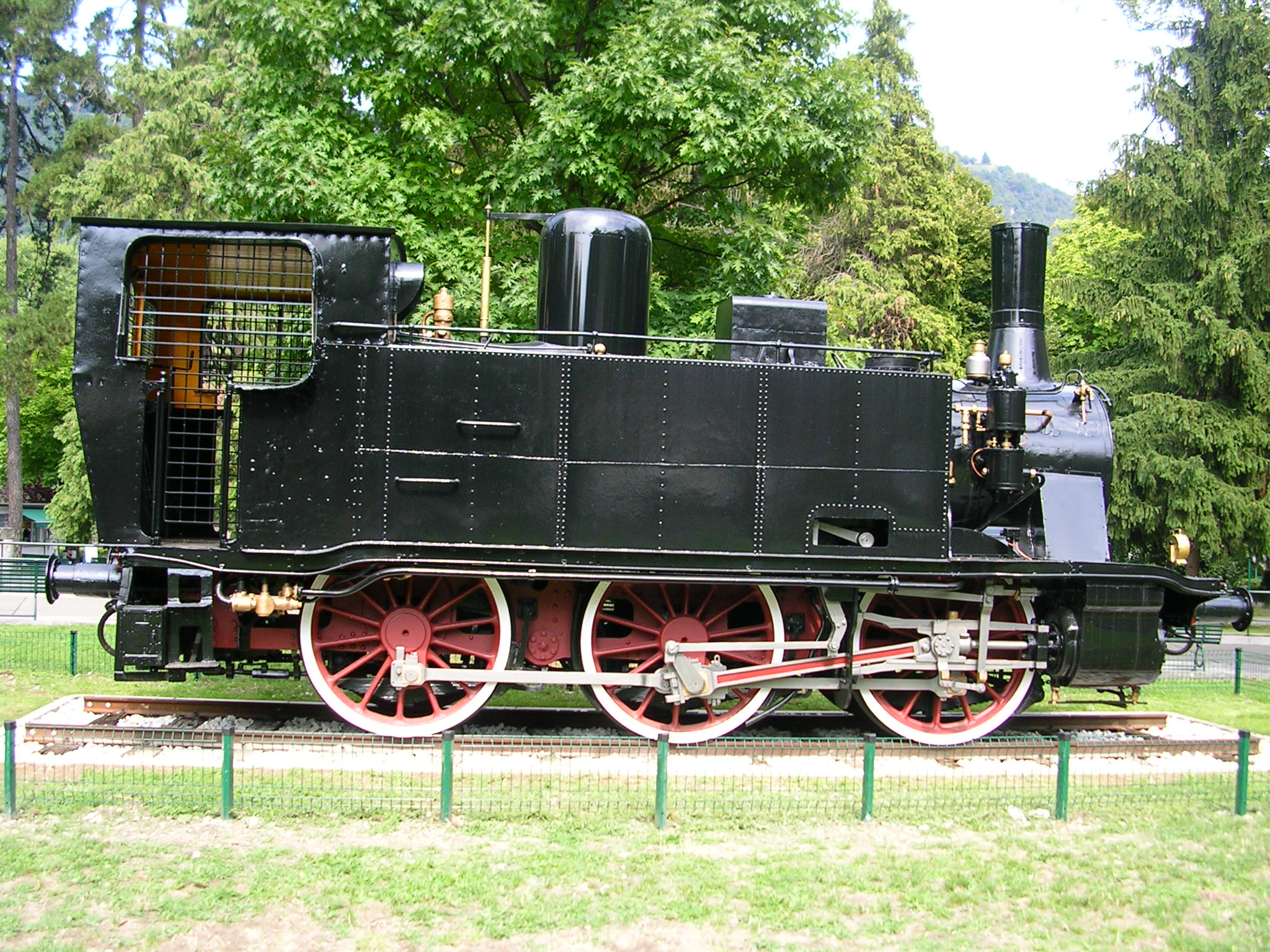
The FS 851.186 locomotive displayed in the Como public gardens, August 2006. On the right, in front of the water box, the single-stage air brake supply compressor (Westinghouse) is visible.

Unlike the other rolling stock C locomotives that came to the FS in 1905-1906) (Note: In 1906 there were 1,257 locomotives with separate C arrangement tender (classes 185, 190, 200, 206, 215, 255, 260, 265, 268, 269, 270, 290, 310, 320, 380, 390, 391, 394, 395, 396, and 397, built between 1857 and 1913 [current deliveries completed after that date]) and 287 C arrangement tank locomotives (classes 812, 813, 815, 816, 817, 821, 821, 825, 827, 828, 829, 830, 848, 849, 850, 851, 870, 885, 898 and 899, built between 1853 and 1922 [current deliveries completed after that date]). By 1915 of the separate C arrangement tender classes built before 1906 only 120, 140, 155, 164, 170, 185, 190, 200, 206, 215, 255, 260, 265, 268, 269, 270, 290, 310, 320, 380 and 391 remained. Of the tank locomotives, C arrangement units built before 1885 were being discontinued. Cf. Briano, pp. 137–138).) the 851s, designed for reinforcement services on mountain pass lines, proved sufficiently powerful, fast and versatile to be able to perform line services with direct passenger trains as well. Therefore, the FS stipulated that, during major repairs, their boilers be replaced with those of the 875 class, designed in 1911 for hauling freight and passenger trains on secondary lines with little traffic.

The fitting on 851.181 of a boiler of 870, carried out in the Officina Grandi Riparazioni at Pietrarsa in March 1930, was probably due to contingent needs rather than experimentation.

In addition to replacing the vacuum brake with an air brake and replacing the boiler, the most important modification undergone by some 851s was the provision for mixed combustion (naphtha and coal). Inspired by the practice of operating with the class 736 locomotives left in Italy by the United States Transportation Corps, which were fueled by naphtha, it was designed to reduce coal consumption (Note: In the immediate postwar period, the destruction by bombing, vandalism and theft of hydroelectric plants and the power grid caused a serious energy crisis, which also affected railroad operations. Cf. Nascimbene e Riccardi, 1995, p. 14).) (naphtha was used for normal service and coal for ignition and standing fire). Between 1947 and 1948 at least 122 locomotives of various classes (835, R.302 and 27 units of class 851) (Note: Thirty according to another source. Cf. Turchi, p. 25).) were thus modified by the OGR in Verona Porta Vescovo and the Officina Grandi Riparazioni in Rimini. They were deployed mainly in the classification yards of Naples, Bologna, Reggio di Calabria, Bari, Rome and Parma, and arrived almost all of them with this modification until they were scrapped. (Note: By the end of the 1950s, the cost of retransformation was deemed unjustified as the termination of the class had already begun as a result of the dieselization of the shunting services. Cf. Riccardi, 2008, p. 31).)

== Operation ==
=== Services ===
The 851s performed the services for which they were designed until the 1920s. Then the increase in train compositions and the introduction into the fleet of an increasing number of metal box coaches, together with that of locomotives of class 940, divided between the Sulmona and Campobasso depots, made it possible to withdraw the 851s from many line services (in some of which they had to be engaged in double and triple traction because of the increase in the masses to be hauled) and to assign them to shunting services, (Note: As was also the case with other classes. Cf. Molino, pp. 21–25).) especially in central and southern Italy. In them they had the opportunity to make their good power and top speed characteristics appreciated, which, owing to the all adhering mass, allowed the delivery of significant performance, better than that of the 835s, even in the typical operating regime of shunting.

Among the last line services were those towing local passenger trains performed on the Rovigo-Chioggia line until about 1969.

Locomotives 851.011, 040, 121 were leased to the Ministry of the Navy from 1939 until an unknown date.

Locomotives were sold: 851.006 to the Ministry of the Navy in 1935, 037 to Breda in 1939, 181 and 187 to the Italian Company for Southern Railways in 1930. Gian Guido Turchi added to the previous units the 150, sold to Railway Connections of Marghera in 1943.

=== Deposits ===
- Assignments in 1906: Antrodoco (11), Avellino (13), Salerno (4), Sulmona (22), and Tivoli (35). 3 were in the workshop for major repairs or special repairs and 26 were under construction.
- Assignments in 1910: Antrodoco (15), Avellino (38), Benevento (1), Catanzaro (16), Cosenza (10), Foggia (12) Roma Tuscolana (2), Salerno (9), Sulmona (49), Tivoli (39). 14 were in the workshop and 1 under construction.
- Assignments in 1918: Brescia (19), Catanzaro (17), Cosenza (9), Foggia (16), Livorno (2), Rome San Lorenzo (15), Salerno (14), Sulmona (33), Taranto (11), Terni (24), Tivoli (29). 19 were on the shop floor.
- Assignments in 1929: Ancona (1), Bari (7), Barletta (4), Cassino (4), Catania (14), Catanzaro (5), Civitavecchia (9), Crotone (2), Fabriano (2), Foggia (41), Foligno (3), Lecce (3), Messina (11), Mestre (1), Orte (4), Palermo (12), Paola (6), Pescara (5), Reggio Calabria (7), Rimini (6), Siena (4), Sulmona (41), Taranto (6), Terni (5).
- Assignments in 1934: Ancona (7), Bari (18), Bologna (8), Cassino (18), Catania (6), Catanzaro (3), Civitavecchia (3), Cosenza (2), Fabriano (1), Florence (1), Foggia (20), Foligno (6), La Spezia (2), Lecco (1), Livorno (1), Messina (7), Mestre (23), Milano Centrale (13), Milano Smistamento (2), Orte (4), Palermo (13), Paola (3), Pescara (1), Pisa (4), Reggio di Calabria (7), Sulmona (20), Taranto (9).
- Assignments in 1940: Ancona (12), Bari (15), Bologna (25), Cagliari (3), Caltanissetta (1), Catania (4), Catanzaro (2), Civitavecchia (1), Cosenza (1), Florence (8), Foggia (10), Foligno (7), Lecco (8), Livorno (5), Mantua (2), Messina (7), Mestre (7), Milano Centrale (1), Naples (8), Palermo (7), Paola (1), Pescara (6), Pisa (7), Reggio di Calabria (6), Rimini (3), Sassari (3), Savona (7), Sulmona (14), Taranto (1), Trieste (1), Udine (9), Venice (2), Verona (5).
- Assignments in 1951: Ancona (12), Bari (17), Bologna Centrale (22), Brescia (4), Cagliari (2), Caltanissetta (5), Castelvetrano (2), Catanzaro (4), Catania (1), Fabriano (2), Foggia (12), Foligno (6), Mestre (7), Naples (10), Padua (13), Palermo (13), Paola (5), Pescara (5), Pistoia (4), Reggio di Calabria (7), Sassari (4), Savona (3), Udine (7), Verona (1), Voghera (1).
- Assignments in 1959: Ancona (8), Bologna San Donato (16), Caltanissetta (7), Castelvetrano (3), Catanzaro (3), Cosenza (4), Foligno (10), Padua (10), Palermo (11), Paola (5), Pescara (3), Reggio di Calabria (8), Rimini (4), Siracusa (3). (Note: In 1958 the inventory was 131 units. Source: Carpignano, p. 265).)
- Assignments in 1969: Bologna (6), Padua (1) (Note: According to Vicuna, p. 348), as of January 1, 1968, the inventory included 44 units. This figure included, as always, machines no longer usable but theoretically still available and awaiting disposal.)
- Assignments in 1971: Alessandria (1), of which 1 was shelved; Bologna Centrale (1), of which 1 was shelved; Bologna San Donato (3), of which 1 was shelved; Caltanissetta (1); Genoa Rivarolo (1), of which 1 was shelved; Lecco (1), of which 1 was shelved; Paola (1), of which 1 was shelved; Verona (1), of which 1 was shelved.

== Museum conservation ==
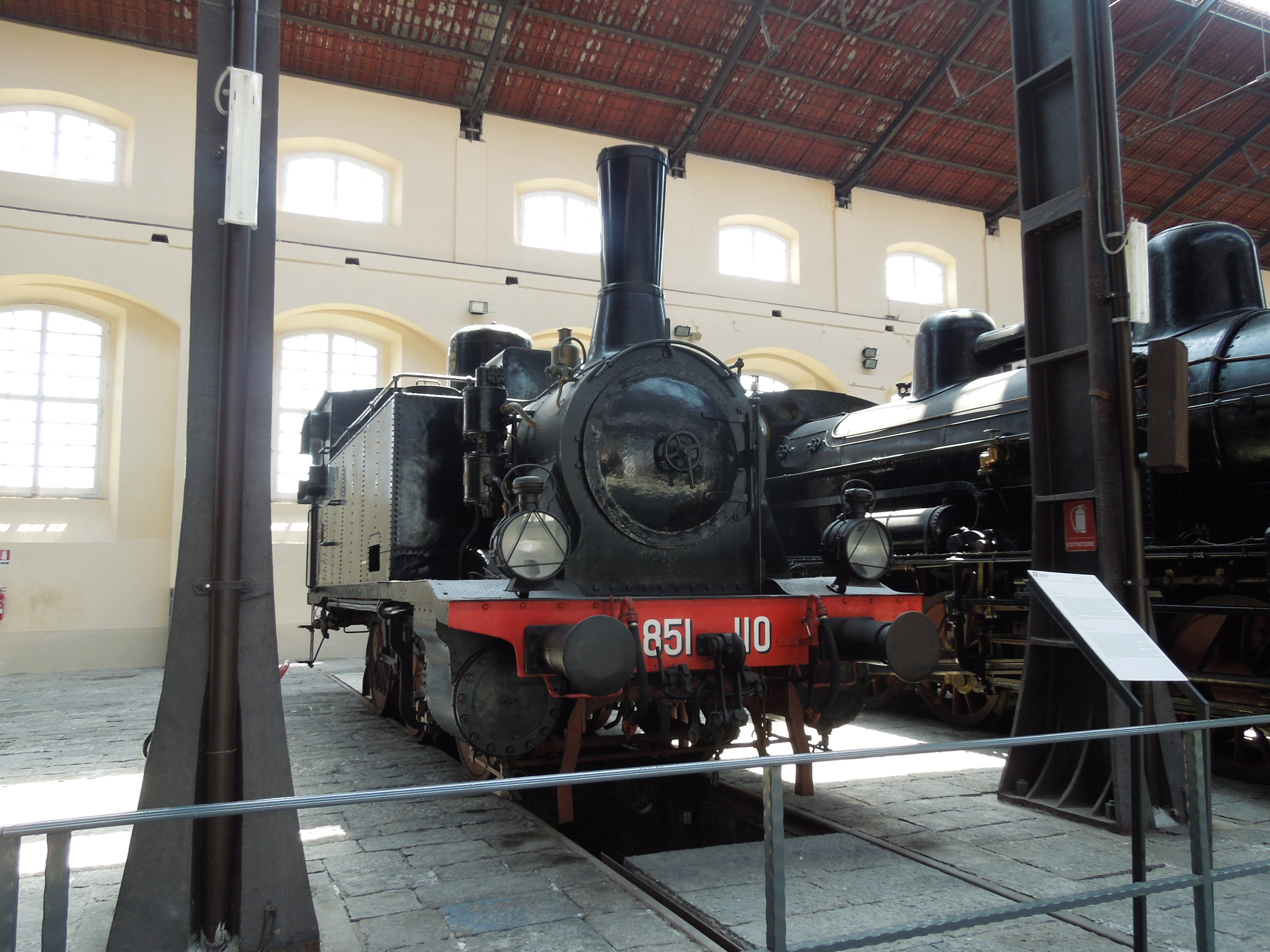
FS locomotive 851.110 preserved in the Pietrarsa National Railway Museum, Aug. 2, 2012

The longevity of the class, due to its qualities, (Note: Accordantly attested by documents and testimonies: they proved to be "very reliable" in the operation. Cf. Riccardi, 2008, p. 29).) favored advocates of preserving some of its units.

Locomotive 851.110, restored by the workshop of the Bologna Centrale locomotive depot, is preserved in the Pietrarsa National Railway Museum. Others are stored with private individuals or in public gardens.

In 1992 the situation was as follows:

851. 043 in consignment to the Centro per la storia delle ferrovie e tramvie, Bologna; 057 in Osnago; 066 at the Impresa Furlanis, Fossalta di Portogruaro; 074 owned by the Associazione Treni Storici Emilia-Romagna-Adriavapore in Rimini; 103 in the Bersano Museum in Nizza Monferrato; 105 in Faenza; 112 in Mestre, home of the Gruppo Fermodellistico Mestrino; 113 in Bitonto; 130 in Rapallo; 186 in Como; 203 in Bologna Centrale awaiting transfer to Guastalla for monumentation. (Note: In 1986 a list presented in the article Sulle locomotive monumento, in I treni oggi, 7 (1986), No. 59, pp. 28-29, also mentioned units 851.013, formerly on display in Palermo in a public garden and later demolished due to vandalism and neglect, 036 at Fossalta di Portogruaro and 097 at Ponton di Domegliara.)

In 2013, the situation was as follows:

851,036 at Laghi di Sibari; 043 owned by the Associazione Amici della Ferrovia Suzzara-Ferrara in San Benedetto Po; 851. 057 owned by the Associazione Gruppo ALe 883 in Tirano; (Note: Since 1997. Cf. Luca Catasta, I treni dell'ALe 883, in I treni, 25 (2004), n. 256, pp. 22-28.) 066 owned by the Impresa Furlanis in Fossalta di Portogruaro; 074 owned by the Associazione Treni Storici Emilia-Romagna-Adriavapore in Rimini; 097 in Ponton di Domegliara; 103 in Nizza Monferrato; 105 in Faenza; 112 in Mestre; 113 in Palagianello; 130 in Rapallo; 186 in Como; and 203 in Novafeltria.

In 2016 the situation was unchanged, with the exception of units 036, demolished in early 2015, and 203, moved to Perticara.

== Railway modelling ==
Models of the 851 FS locomotives have been produced by several specialized firms including Rivarossi since 1964. Completely new models in H0 scale were brought to market in 2016 by the firms LE Models, Hornby (under the Lima brand) and OsKar.

== See also ==
- List of Italian rolling stock

== Bibliography ==
=== Printed sources ===
- Abate, Carlo (1924). La locomotiva a vapore. Milan: Hoepli.
- Accomazzi, Pietro (1923). Nozioni elementari sulla locomotiva delle strade ferrate. Turin-Genoa: Lattes.
- Guido Corbellini (1955). "Il cinquantenario delle Ferrovie dello Stato". Ingegneria Ferroviaria. 10 (5–6): 333–528.
- Manlio Diegoli (1961). "La trazione a vapore". Ingegneria Ferroviaria. 16 (7–8): 671–680. ISSN 0020-0956.
- Ferrovie dello Stato. Servizio centrale X Trazione e materiale. Ufficio studi e collaudi, Tipi del materiale rotabile in costruzione nel 1905-1906, Firenze, Ferrovie dello Stato, 1906, tav. 17.
- Ferrovie dello Stato. Direzione generale. Servizio Trazione, Album dei tipi delle locomotive ed automotrici, Firenze, Ferrovie dello Stato, 1915, tav. 157 e 158.
- Ferrovie dello Stato. Direzione generale. Servizio Materiale e Trazione, Album dei tipi delle locomotive ed automotrici. Aggiornato al 31 dicembre 1922, Appendice II, Firenze, Ferrovie dello Stato, 1923, prospetti 124 e 125.
- Ferrovie dello Stato. Divisione autonoma Relazioni Aziendali (1982). Museo Nazionale Ferroviario di Napoli Pietrarsa. Riuso musealistico delle antiche officine borboniche. Roma: Ferrovie dello Stato. pp. 62–63.
- Ministero delle Comunicazioni. Ferrovie dello Stato. Scuole Aiuto macchinisti, Nozioni di cultura professionale, vol. 2, parte 1, La locomotiva a vapore, Firenze, Soc. an. stab. tipografico già G. Civelli, 1940.
- Ministero dei Trasporti e dell'Aviazione Civile; Ferrovie dello Stato (1963). Prefazione generale all'orario di servizio. Roma.
- Giuseppe Vicuna (1968). Organizzazione e tecnica ferroviaria. Roma: Collegio Ingegneri Ferroviari Italiani. pp. 348, 350.

=== Historiography and complements ===
- "Prove e misure. Locomotiva FS 851. Le Models H0". I Treni. 37 (397): 42–45. 2016. ISSN 0392-4602.
- "Hobby Model Expo 40ª edizione". I Treni. 37 (397): 46–60. 2016. ISSN 0392-4602.
- "Hobby Model Expo 2016". Mondo Ferroviario. 30 (348): 12–52. 2016. ISSN 0394-8854.
- "La 851.124 di LE Models". Mondo Ferroviario. 30 (348): 60–62. 2016. ISSN 0394-8854.
- "HME 2016 Talk Show". Tutto Treno. 28 (312): 45–66. 2016. ISSN 1124-4232.
- Italo Briano (1977). Storia delle ferrovie in Italia. Vol. 2° La tecnica 1. Milano: Cavallotti. pp. 96–97, 104, 138, 181.
- Carpignano, Augusto (2008). La locomotiva a vapore. Viaggio tra tecnica e condotta di un mezzo di ieri. Savigliano: L'artistica editrice. ISBN 978-88-7320-191-5.
- Cornolò, Giovanni (1998). Locomotive a vapore FS. Parma: Ermanno Albertelli. pp. 489–491. ISBN 88-85909-91-4.
- Alcide Damen, Valerio Naglieri, Plinio Pirani (1971). Treni di tutto il mondo. Italia. Locomotive a vapore. Parma: Ermanno Albertelli. pp. 75–76.
- Greggio, Luciano (1997). Le locomotive a vapore. Modelli di tutto il mondo dalle origini ad oggi con dati tecnici. Milan: Mondadori. pp. 138, 240–241.
- Kalla-Bishop, Peter Michael (1986). Italian State Railways steam locomotives. Abingdon: R. Tourret. pp. 86–87. ISBN 0-905878-03-5.
- Paolo Marini (2013). "Locomotive a vapore oggi". I Treni. 34 (365): 1–8, inserto centrale. ISSN 0392-4602.
- Domenico Molino (1975). "Le locomotive che diventarono da manovra". Italmodel Ferrovie. 27 (179): 21–25.
- Angelo Nascimbene, Aldo Riccardi (1995). FS anni '50. Vol. prima parte Trazione a vapore e Diesel. Albignasego: Duegi. ISSN 1124-4232.
- Angelo Nascimbene, Aldo Riccardi (2005). 1905-2005. Cento anni di locomotive a vapore delle Ferrovie dello Stato. Albignasego: Duegi. ISSN 1124-4232.
- Claudio Pedrazzini (2016). "Ricordo delle locomotive F.S. Gr. 851. Prima parte". Mondo Ferroviario. 30 (348): 54–59. ISSN 0394-8854.
- Giancarlo Piro, Giuseppe Vicuna (2000). Il materiale rotabile motore. Roma: Collegio Ingegneri Ferroviari Italiani. pp. 25–31.
- Aldo Riccardi, Locomotive FS a combustione mista, in Tutto treno, 15 (2004), n. 176, pp. 16–21. ISSN 1124-4232.
- Aldo Riccardi, Il crepuscolo degli dei, in Ferrovie italiane anni sessanta, Albignasego, Duegi, 2000, pp. 22–34. ISSN 1124-4232.
- Aldo Riccardi (2008). "Le eclettiche Gruppo 851". Tutto Treno. 21 (217): 26–39. ISSN 1124-4232.
- Aldo Riccardi, Marco Sartori, Marcello Grillo (2011). Locomotive a vapore in Italia. Dalle tre reti alle FS. 1885-1905. Firenze: Pegaso. pp. 285–289.
- Aldo Riccardi, Marco Sartori, Marcello Grillo (2013). Locomotive a vapore in Italia. Ferrovie dello Stato. 1905-1906. Firenze: Pegaso. pp. 324–342.
- Gian Guido Turchi (2016). "Gruppo 851 FS: non solo manovre". I Treni. 37 (397): 18–25. ISSN 0392-4602.
