= 830 class =

830 class or Class 830 may refer to:

- FS Class 830 I, Italian 0-6-0 steam locomotives
- South Australian Railways 830 class, diesel locomotives
