= Fossalta =

Fossalta may refer to:

- Fossalta di Piave, town in the Metropolitan City of Venice, Veneto, Italy
- Fossalta di Portogruaro, town in the Metropolitan City of Venice, Veneto, Italy
