= FS Class E.321 (third rail) =

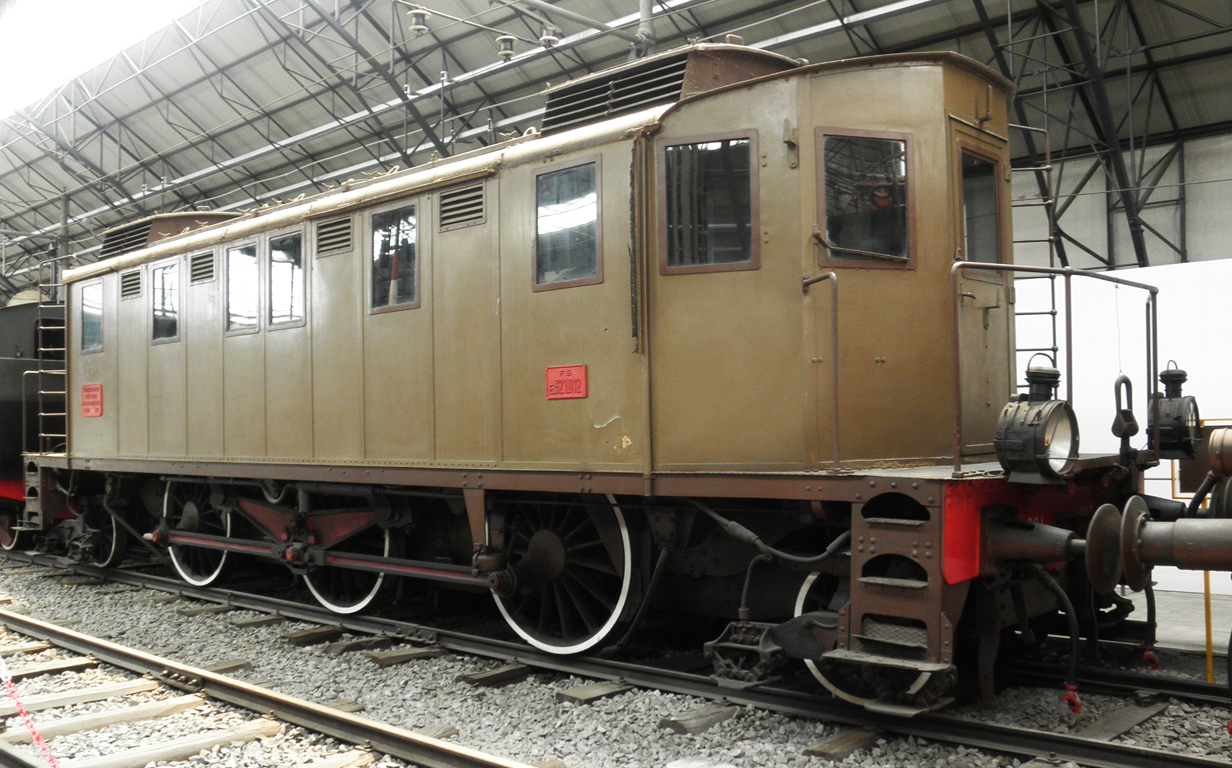
- E.321 electric locomotive at the Museum of Science and Technology in Milan
Type and origin
- Power type: Electric
- Builder: OM, TIBB
- Build date: 1923–1927
- Total produced: 17
Specifications
- Configuration
  - Whyte: 2-6-2RE
  - AAR: 1-C-1
  - UIC: 1′C1′
- Gauge: 1,435 mm (4 ft 8 1/2 in) standard gauge
- Wheel diameter: 1,500 mm (59.06 in)
- Length: 12.77 m (41 ft 10 3/4 in)
- Adhesive weight: 48 t (47.2 long tons; 52.9 short tons)
- Loco weight: 69 t (67.9 long tons; 76.1 short tons)
- Electric system/s: 650 V DC third rail
- Current pickup: Contact shoe
- Traction motors: DC
Performance figures
- Maximum speed: 95 km/h (59 mph)
- Power output: 1,450 kW (1,940 hp)
Career
- Operators: FS
- Disposition: One preserved

FS Class E.321 was a class of 17 third-rail electric locomotives, built for the Italian State Railways (FS) for operation on the Varese line and on the underground line in Naples.

== History ==
The E.321 was an evolution and improvement of the previous FS Class E.320. Seventeen units were built by Officine Meccaniche (OM) of Milan, with electrical equipment by Tecnomasio Italiano-Brown-Boveri (TIBB), from 1923 to haul heavy passenger trains on the electrified line of the Milan - Varese - Porto Ceresio railway and for use on the so-called "subway" of Naples.

== Construction ==
The locomotive consisted of a single central box, following the typical design of the time, with cabs and control desks at each end. This was mounted on a rigid frame carried on three coupled axles with 1,500 mm (59 in) driving wheels and a carrying axle on the typical Italian Zara bogie at each end. The wheel arrangement was 1′C1′. The electrical equipment was contained in the central body. Two direct current (DC) traction motors provided a total power of 1,450 kilowatts (1,940 hp) and the locomotive could reach a maximum speed of 95 km/h (59 mph).

The design was almost the same as the E.320, but addressed the fragility of the E.320's mechanical rod transmission. The two motors, of similar but slightly lower power rating, were now set lower in the frame. This allowed the previous arrangement of steeply inclined coupling rods to intermediate jackshafts to be replaced by a lighter triangular rod on each side, similar to that used on the Italian three-phase locomotives, and no longer needing the jackshafts. The total weight of the locomotive in working order was 69 tonnes (68 long tons; 76 short tons), of which 48 tonnes (47 long tons; 53 short tons) was adhesive. This was nearly three tonnes lighter than the E.320 and yet there was nearly a ton more adhesive weight.

They were painted in the typical khaki brown Castano-Isabella livery of Italian electric locomotives.

== Preservation ==
E.321.012 is preserved at the Museum of Science and Technology in Milan.

== See also ==
- FS Class E.321, a 3,000 V overhead line loco of 1957
