= E320 =

E320 may refer to:

- British Rail Class 374, or Eurostar e320, a European high-speed train
- Butylated hydroxyanisole (E number E320), a synthetic, waxy petrochemical
- FS Class E.320, a class of Italian third-rail electric locomotives, built in the 1910s
- ThinkPad E320, a 2011 Gen 2 Lenovo ThinkPad E series notebook computer
- E 320, a model in the Mercedes-Benz E-Class range of automobiles
