= FS Class 835 =

FS 835
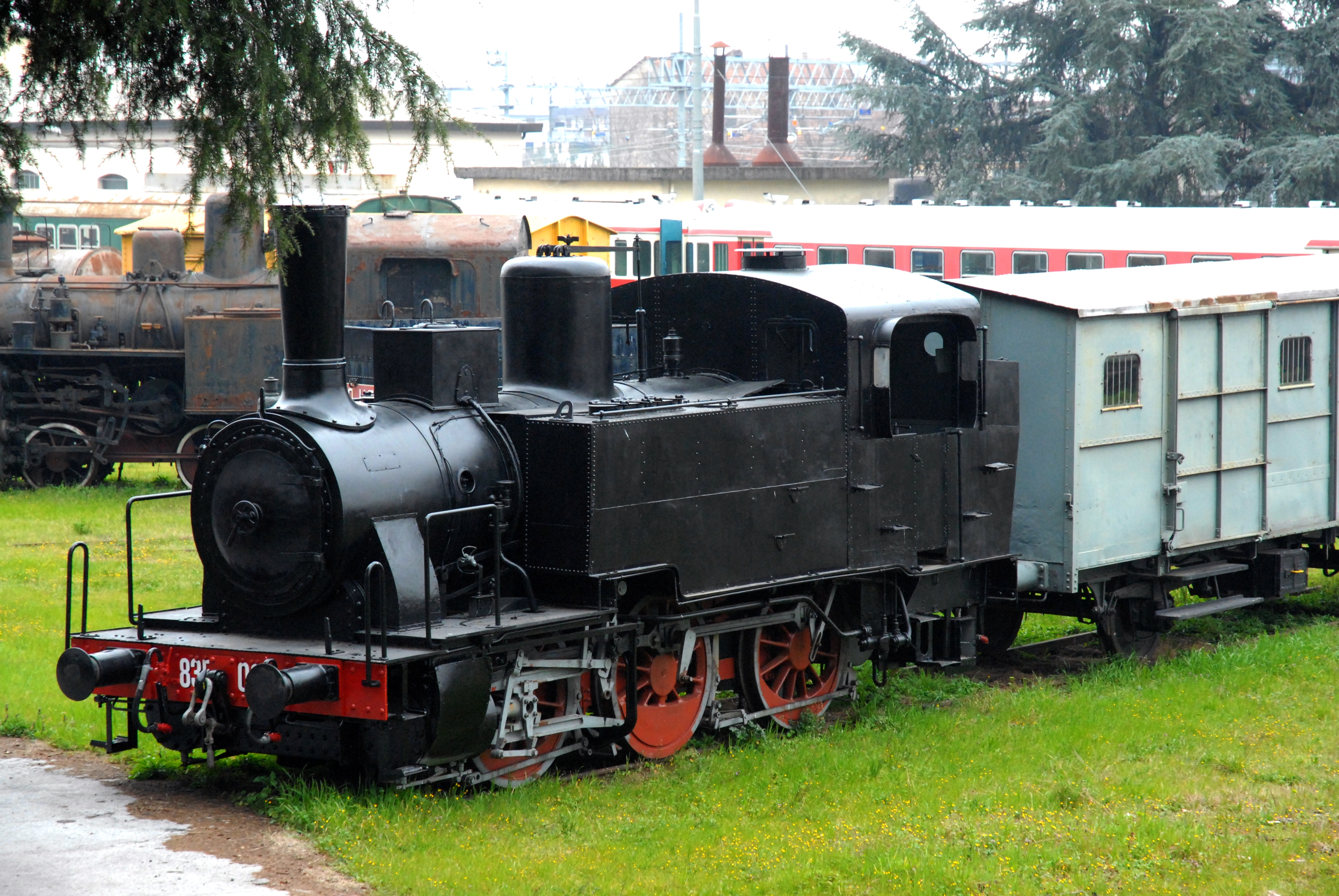
- FS locomotive 835.088 as preserved
Type and origin
- Power type: Steam
- Builder: Gio. Ansaldo & C. (24), Ernesto Breda (150), Reggiane (30), Officine Meccaniche (166)
- Build date: 1906–1922
- Total produced: 370
Specifications
- Configuration
  - Whyte: 0-6-0T
  - UIC: C n2t
- Gauge: 1,435 mm (4 ft 8 1/2 in)
- Driver dia.: 1,310 mm (4 ft 3 5/8 in)
- Wheelbase
  - Axle spacing (Asymmetrical): 1,750 mm (5 ft 8 7/8 in); 1,850 mm (6 ft 7/8 in)
  - Engine: 3,600 mm (11 ft 9 3/4 in)
- Length
  - Over headstocks: 8,140 mm (26 ft 8 1/2 in)
  - Over buffers: 9,160 mm (30 ft 5/8 in)
- Width: 2,910 mm (9 ft 6 5/8 in)
- Height: 4,205 mm (13 ft 9 1/2 in)
- Axle load: 15.1 tonnes (14.9 long tons; 16.6 short tons)
- Loco weight: 45.3 tonnes (44.6 long tons; 49.9 short tons)
- Fuel type: Coal
- Fuel capacity: 1,500 kg (3,300 lb)
- Water cap.: 5,000 L (1,100 imp gal; 1,320 US gal)
- Firebox
  - Grate area: 1.48 m^{2} (15.9 sq ft)
- Boiler
  - Pitch: 2,105 mm (6 ft 10 7/8 in)
- Boiler pressure: 12 kg/cm^{2} (11.8 bar; 171 psi)
- Heating surface: 78.22 m^{2} (842.0 sq ft)
- Cylinders: Two, outside
- Cylinder size: 420 mm × 580 mm (16.54 in × 22.83 in)
- Valve gear: Walschaerts
Performance figures
- Maximum speed: 55 km/h (34 mph)
- Power output: 370 PS (272 kW; 365 hp)
- Tractive effort: 7,680 kgf (75.3 kN; 16,900 lbf)
Career
- Operators: Ferrovie dello Stato
- Numbers: 8351–8447, 83598–83816 from 1919: 835.001 – 835.370
- Withdrawn: 1984
- Disposition: 54 preserved

The Ferrovie dello Stato Italiane (FS; Italian State Railways) Class 835 (Italian: Gruppo 835) is a 0-6-0T steam locomotive; it was the standard steam shunter of the FS.

== Design and construction ==
The Class 835 was derived from the work of the Turin offices of the Rete Mediterranea, and the previous experiences with the Class 829 and Class 830; especially from the latter, the Class 835 took the boiler, coupled with an engine with enlarged cylinders.

The first 97 locomotives, all built by Ernesto Breda until 1908, had only the counter-pressure steam brake; subsequent locomotives all had the air brakes.

In all, 370 Class 835 locomotives were built between 1908 and 1922 (with the pause imposed by World War I, by Breda, Ansaldo, Reggiane and Officine Meccaniche, making the class one of the most numerous to circulate on Italian railways.

== Service ==
Nicknamed "Cirilla" or "Pierina", the Class 835 locomotives spent their careers on shunting duties throughout all the Italian network; in the 1930s, several of them were loaned to other private railways or to private companies.

Three of them (the 019, 198 and 220) remained in Yugoslav territory after World War II and were taken over by the Yugoslav Railways with the same running numbers.

Between the 1950s and 1960s, the frames, wheels and coupling rods of several Class 835 locomotives were used in building 40 Class E.321 and 20 Class E.322 electric shunting locomotives, and 29 Class D.234 diesel-hydraulic shunters.

The Class 835 soldiered on until the end of regular steam services on the FS, with some 30 locomotives being still active in the early 1980s.

== Preservation ==
54 Class 835 locomotives survived into preservation, as the class was a favourite for the choice of a static exhibit in the waning years of steam. It is also present in the collection of several railway and transportation museums in Italy, among which the Pietrarsa railway museum and the Museo della Scienza e della Tecnologia "Leonardo da Vinci". None is currently operational.

== Bibliography ==
- Cornolò, Giovanni (October 2014). "Locomotive a vapore". TuttoTreno (4).
- Kalla-Bishop, P. M. (1986). Italian State Railways Steam Locomotives. Abingdon: Tourret Publishing. ISBN 0-905878-03-5.
