= FS E.323 and E.324 =

Italian electric locomotive

FS locomotives E.323 and E.324
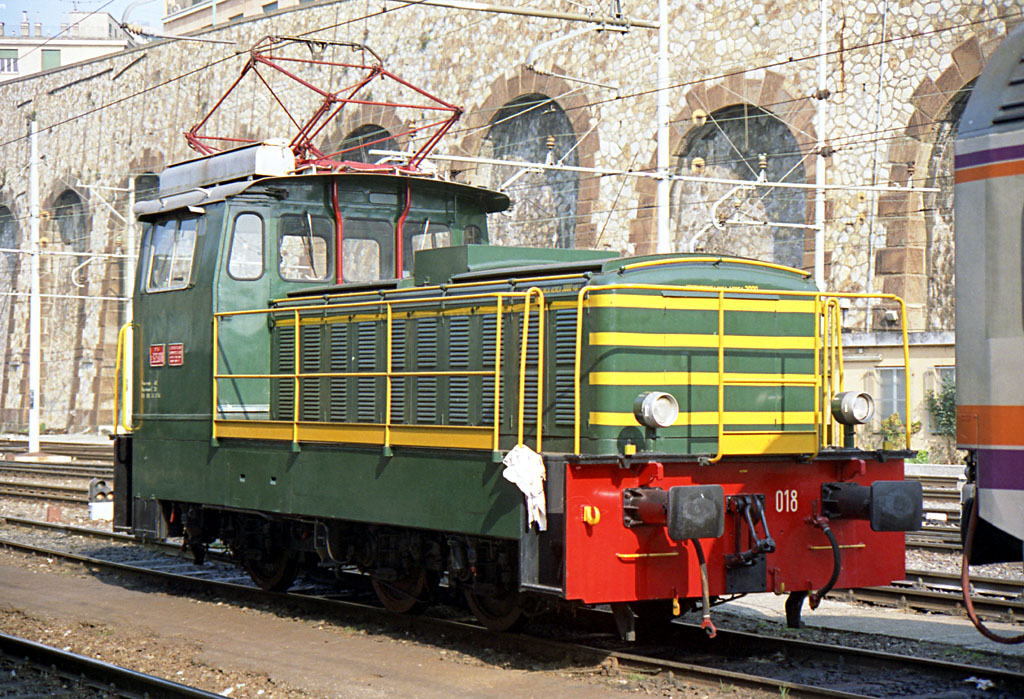
- FS locomotive E.323.018 in service at Genova Brignole railway station on March 10, 1996
Type and origin
- Power type: Electric
- Builder: Tecnomasio
- Build date: 1st series: 1966-1967; 2nd series: 1970-1971
- Total produced: 30 E.323 + 10 E.324
Specifications
- Configuration
  - UIC: C
- Wheel diameter: 1,040 mm (41 in)
- Wheelbase
  - Leading: 4,000 mm (13 ft) (1,500 + 2,500 mm [4.9 + 8.2 ft])
- Length: 9,240 mm (30.31 ft)
- Height: 3,700 mm (12.1 ft)
- Loco weight: 46 tonnes (45 long tons; 51 short tons)
- Power supply: Direct current at 3 kV
- Gear ratio: 1:15.8 (V_{max}32 km/h [20 mph]); 1:7.54 (V_{max} 64 km/h [40 mph]).
Performance figures
- Maximum speed: 64 km/h (40 mph)
- Power output
  - 1 hour: 210 kW (280 hp)
  - Continuous: 190 kW (250 hp)
- Tractive effort
  - Starting: 147 kN (33,000 lbf)
  - 1 hour: 91.2 kN (20,500 lbf) at 6.66 km/h (4.14 mph)
  - Continuous: 82.4 kN (18,500 lbf) at 7.44 km/h (4.62 mph)

The E.323 and E.324 were two classes of 3,000 V direct current electric locomotives operated by the Italian State Railways (FS), primarily used for shunting duties in large rail yards. The E.324 class lacked both a driver's cab and a pantograph, and was designed to operate in multiple unit control with the E.323 class, effectively doubling the latter's performance.

These locomotives were a development of the FS E.321 and E.322 classes. They retained the electrical systems of their predecessors, updated based on operational experience and technological advancements, while the mechanical components were newly designed.

In the early 1970s, as part of a collaboration between FS and the Faculty of Engineering at the University of Rome "La Sapienza," an E.323 unit was selected for the development and testing of an electronic converter intended to power a three-phase traction motor. This project, which would have marked the first application of a three-phase traction motor in a 3 kV DC locomotive, was eventually abandoned due to advancements in power electronics associated with the development of the E.402 class locomotives.

== History ==
=== Project ===
In the second half of the 1960s, the positive operational results of the E.321 and E.322 classes prompted the Italian State Railways (FS) to expand the use of electric locomotives for shunting services. In the development of the new project, it was decided to retain the electrical components of the earlier models, while the mechanical parts—such as the carriage, running gear, and brake system—were newly designed. The design followed that of the standardised Class 245 locomotives (units 245.1001–1020, 2001–2020, and 6010–6124). This configuration, using the same GLM 2405 motor as in the E.321 and E.322, allowed for a transmission system employing universal joints and telescopic shafts. It also enabled the use of a gearbox with two gear ratios: one providing a maximum speed of 32 km/h (20 mph) for shunting, and another allowing speeds up to 64 km/h (40 mph) for mainline movements and light freight haulage. As with the E.321 and E.322, the project was developed by FS in collaboration with Tecnomasio Italiano Brown Boveri (TIBB).

=== Construction ===
The construction of both the electrical and mechanical components was entrusted to Tecnomasio Italiano Brown Boveri. As with the E.321 class, non-cab units known as "motor trailers" were developed to operate under the control of the cab-equipped E.323 units. These were classified as E.324 and were mechanically identical to the E.323 but without a driver's cab. Due to this configuration, similar to the E.322 class, they were colloquially referred to as "dogs" (cani). The following subclasses were built:

- E.323.001–010 and 011–020 (delivered in 1966 and 1970–71);
- E.323.101–105 (delivered in 1966–1967);
- E.323.201–205 (delivered in 1971);
- E.324.101–105 (delivered in 1966–1967);
- E.324.201–205 (delivered in 1971);

Based on prior experience with units E.321.200 and E.322.200, locomotive E.323.200 was specially designed and built with the capability to remotely control two E.324.200 units.

Between April and October 1967, locomotive E.323.105 was included in a national exhibition of rolling stock, alongside other locomotives, passenger coaches, and freight wagons. The exhibition took place in major Italian railway stations and aimed to present to the public the ongoing renewal of the FS fleet as part of the Ten-Year Modernization Plan (1962–1972).

==== Maintenance ====
Engine trailer E.324.105 and locomotive E.323.105 in the Apulia Railway Museum on March 1, 2018.

Locomotives of the E.323 and E.324 classes underwent major overhauls every 40,000 hours of operation. Midway through this interval, an intermediate "R III" overhaul was carried out, which did not require the complete disassembly of the locomotive body.

=== Operation ===
==== Services ====
The E.323 and E.324 locomotives were exclusively employed in shunting operations. They gradually replaced the last remaining steam shunting locomotives, which were being phased out, and also displaced diesel locomotives and their immediate predecessors, the E.321 and E.322 classes. The latter had already demonstrated strong performance under the demanding, continuous workloads typical of hump yards in large marshalling stations.

In addition to performing shunting duties on station sidings, the E.323 and E.324 were regularly used in major marshalling yards and for ferry operations involving the boarding and disembarkation of trains to and from Sicily, specifically at Messina Marittima and Villa San Giovanni stations.

Due to their design characteristics, these locomotives were only occasionally used for mainline operations or for hauling troop trains.

===== Performance in shunting service =====
The shunting performance of the E.323 and E.324 locomotives is detailed in the following table, sourced from the General Preface to the Timetable of Service (Prefazione Generale all'Orario di Servizio, PGOS) of the Italian State Railways. The table specifies the maximum loads, expressed in tonnes, that the locomotives were capable of hauling in shunting service, depending on track gradient.

Tonnage performance of railcars and shunting locomotives in shunting service
Class	Gradient ‰						Power HP
Class	3	6	10	15	20	25	Power HP
E.321; E.322 (1)	740	550	400	300	240	190	260
E.323; E.324 (1)	1050	770	560	420	340	260	260
(1) For the pairs E.321 + E.322 and E.323 + E.324, the performance is twice as much as shown in the table.

===== Performance on the line =====
The performance of the E.323 and E.324 locomotives in traction and full-line service is presented in the following table, sourced from the General Preface to the Timetable of Service (Prefazione Generale all'Orario di Servizio, PGOS) of the Italian State Railways. The table indicates the load, in tonnes, that the locomotives were capable of hauling in full-line service, depending on the performance classification of the line.

CLASS E.321 — E.322 — E.323 — E.324 — (1)
Speed	Performance grades of the lines																							
Speed	1	2	3	4	5	6	7	8	9	10	11	12	13	14	15	16	17	18	19	20	21	22	23	24
50 km/h	65	60	55	50	45	40	35	30	25	25	—	—	—	—	—	—	—	—	—	—	—	—	—	—
40 km/h	145	135	125	120	110	110	95	90	80	75	65	60	55	50	45	40	35	30	25	20	—	—	—	—
35 km/h	210	200	185	175	165	160	145	135	125	115	105	95	85	80	75	70	60	55	50	45	40	40	35	30
30 km/h	310	290	270	255	240	225	210	200	180	165	150	140	130	120	110	105	95	90	80	75	70	65	60	55
25 km/h	440	410	385	360	340	320	300	280	260	240	220	200	190	180	170	160	145	130	120	110	105	100	95	90
20 km/h	620	570	535	500	475	450	425	400	370	340	315	290	270	250	235	220	205	190	180	170	160	150	140	130
(1) For the pairs E.321 + E.322 and E.323 + E.324, the performance is twice as much as shown in the table.

==== Depots ====
As of January 1985, units of the E.323 and E.324 classes were distributed across the following depots:

- E.323.001–020, not equipped for multiple-unit operation with E.324s, were assigned to:
  - Torino Smistamento (1), Alessandria (2), Genova Brignole (3), Savona (1), Verona (2), Fortezza (1), Udine (1), Bologna (3), Florence (1), Pisa (1), Livorno (1), Ancona (1), Bari (1), Foggia (1);
- E.323 locomotives of the 100 and 200 series, equipped for multiple-unit operation with E.324s, were assigned to:
  - Alessandria (1), Milano Smistamento (2), Verona (1), Udine (1), Reggio Calabria (5);
- E.324 motor trailers generally followed the assignment of E.323 units with matching numbering. However, FS did not typically report their quantities per individual depot.

As of 31 December 1991, all E.323 and E.324 units remained in service and were distributed as follows:

- E.323.001–020 were assigned to:
  - Alessandria (3), Genoa Rivarolo (3), Savona (1), Verona (2), Udine (1), Bologna (3), Pisa (3), Ancona (1), Rome San Lorenzo (1), Foggia (1), Reggio Calabria (1)
- E.323+E.324 pairs of the 100 and 200 series were assigned to:
  - Alessandria (3), Milano Smistamento (2), Verona (1), Udine (1), Foggia (1), Reggio Calabria (2)

According to Haydock (1995), all units of both classes were still in existence and distributed as follows:

- E.323.001–020:
  - Alessandria (3), Ancona (1), Bologna Centrale (1), Foggia (1), Genoa Rivarolo (3), Pisa Sant'Ermete (3), Reggio di Calabria (1), Rome San Lorenzo (1), Savona (1), Udine (1), Verona (4);
- E.323.100 series:
  - Alessandria (2), Reggio di Calabria (3);
- E.323.200 series:
  - Alessandria (1), Milano Smistamento (1), Udine (1), Verona (2);
- E.324.100 series:
  - Alessandria (2), Reggio di Calabria (3);
- E.324.200 series:
  - Alessandria (1), Milano Smistamento (1), Udine (1), Verona (2).

==== Shelving and decommissioning ====
As of 30 January 2000, all units remained in service:

- Thirty E.323 units were assigned as follows: FS Regional Division (16), FS Passenger Division (3), FS Cargo Division (11)
- Ten E.324 units were assigned as follows: FS Regional Division (2), FS Passenger Division (2), FS Cargo Division (6).

Withdrawal began in 2002, and all units were decommissioned between October 2002 and June 2009.

As of today, locomotive E.323.010 remains stored in deteriorated condition at the Rimini Locomotive Depot.

=== Museum preservation ===
The E.323.105 + E.324.105 locomotive pair has been preserved and is on loan to the amateur railway association AISAF, based in Lecce.

== Features ==
Following the favorable operational results of the E.321 and E.322 locomotives—whose use led to notable savings compared to diesel traction—the Italian State Railways (FS) decided to acquire an additional batch of similar locomotives. However, for these new units, a completely redesigned mechanical section was developed to meet all the requirements of shunting service.

For the same reasons that had guided the design of the E.321, the Ward Leonard-type control scheme was retained. The locomotives used the same electrical equipment, including a 260 kW (350 hp) double-commutator primary motor powered at 3 kV, and a main generator of TIBB-CGE construction rated at 210 kW (280 hp) at 1,250 rpm, producing 460 V. The traction motor developed 190 kW (250 hp) of continuous power and 210 kW (280 hp) at hourly rating. The only electrical modification introduced was the adoption of field weakening on the traction motor.

Notably, without changing the electrical equipment, the addition of a two-speed gearbox and field weakening led to a significant increase in performance compared to the E.321 and E.322, as illustrated in the PGOS (General Preface to the Timetable of Service) data referenced in the Services section.

=== Mechanical part ===
Despite the strong operational results of the E.321 and E.322 classes, their performance was limited by an outdated mechanical design, notably the use of connecting rod transmission and internal bushings with plain bearings.

To address these shortcomings, the E.323 and E.324 classes adopted the mechanical configuration developed for the new "unified" Class 245 diesel locomotives. Key features included:

- Three wheelsets equipped with external bushings, fitted with roller bearings, designed to allow transverse axle movement for negotiating curves with a minimum radius of 70 m (230 ft);
- Suspension consisting of leaf springs superimposed on the bushings and connected to the chassis by adjustable hangers;
- A pair of rocker arms connecting the first and second wheelsets;
- An automatic flange lubrication system (De Limon type);
- A two-speed reduction gearbox (Hurt HSN 1200/2 type) located between the second and third wheelsets, allowing selection of maximum speeds of 32 km/h or 64 km/h.

The gearbox was connected to the traction motor via a coupling with rubber spring elements and transmitted power to the drive decks (Hurt type HSK 19) mounted on each locomotive wheelset with universal joints.

During shunting operations, the low-speed gear (32 km/h) was typically used to provide maximum tractive effort. For light-load or isolated movements, the high-speed gear (64 km/h) could be engaged, though with tractive effort reduced by half.

Gear selection could only be performed while the locomotive was stationary, using an electropneumatic device. This system also allowed the gearbox to be set to a "neutral" position, disconnecting the mechanical linkage to the traction motor when the locomotive needed to be towed.

=== Electrical part ===
The electrical system of the E.323 and E.324 locomotives was based on that of the earlier E.321 and E.322 classes, with several modifications introduced based on operational experience with those predecessors.

As in the E.321 and E.322 classes, all electrical machinery—except for the traction motor mounted on the underframe—was located at the front of the locomotive, housed within the forebody.

The electrical equipment included a primary motor fed from the 3 kV DC overhead line, mechanically coupled to the shaft of the main generator, forming a single unit. This unit, via pulleys and V-belts, also drove a second block composed of two DC generators. One generator supplied the auxiliary circuits and recharged the batteries, while the other provided separate excitation for the primary motor. The same assembly also powered a centrifugal fan for cooling the traction motor. On the opposite side of the unit, a compressor was mechanically driven to supply the locomotive's pneumatic and brake systems.

==== Traction circuit ====
The five external features of the main generator selectable with the shunting combiner.

Simplified diagram of the traction circuit of E.323 and E.324 locomotives.

A conventional DC traction system—where a motor is supplied with constant voltage—was considered unsuitable for shunting service due to two main limitations: a rapid decrease in torque with increasing motor speed, and high energy losses from the starting rheostat. In shunting locomotives, the rheostat would have needed to remain engaged for prolonged periods and occupy substantial space. Additionally, the modest power requirements made the use of a single traction motor almost mandatory, rendering the speed regulation techniques used in multi-motor mainline locomotives (such as series-parallel switching) impractical.

As with the E.321 and E.322 classes, a system was adopted similar to that used in diesel-electric locomotives. In this setup, the Diesel engine is replaced by a 3 kV DC electric primary motor, resulting in a Ward Leonard-type arrangement, adapted for railway use.

This configuration, largely unchanged from the earlier classes, included a primary motor directly fed from the overhead line, mechanically coupled to a main generator. The generator supplied an adjustable voltage to the traction motor over a wide range, allowing speed regulation without using a series rheostat.

Speed control was managed by the driver using a set of resistors inserted into the excitation circuit of the main generator. Each setting on the shunting controller corresponded to one of five voltage-current curves, known as "external characteristics," depicted in red on the associated performance graph.

These characteristics allowed significant voltage variation in response to load current changes, enabling the generator to limit inrush current and automatically adjust voltage during acceleration. This arrangement fulfilled the same function as a starting rheostat but without energy dissipation.

The only modification to the traction circuit compared to the E.321 and E.322 was the introduction of field weakening for the traction motor. This required the addition of an electropneumatic contactor and an upgrade to the control circuitry.

==== Control circuitry ====
The inclusion of traction motor field weakening and a two-speed gearbox (32 or 64 km/h) required additional controls beyond those present on the E.321 shunting console. An interlocking circuit was implemented to synchronize the speed selector settings between the E.323 locomotive and the E.324 motor trailers when operated in multiple-unit configuration.

==== Electric heating circuit ====
No electric train heating systems were installed on any units of the E.323 or E.324 classes.

==== Auxiliary circuits ====
As with the E.321 and E.322, auxiliary power was provided by a DC generator belt-driven from the primary engine. A voltage regulator connected to the generator managed the control, lighting, and battery charging circuits.

=== Pneumatic part ===
Compressed air for the pneumatic controls and braking systems was produced by a Westinghouse 241-P type compressor, mechanically driven by the primary motor. This eliminated the need for expensive 3 kV motor-driven compressors.

An auxiliary electric compressor, powered either by the auxiliary generator or the battery, supplied the air required to raise the pantograph.

Compared to the E.321 and E.322 classes, the following components were added to the electropneumatic system:

- the solenoid valve for the speed selector control;
- the solenoid valve of the field weakening contactor.

== Economic considerations ==
Performance curve of electric locomotive E.323 compared with that of Diesel locomotive 245.Tractive effort is expressed in kilograms-force rather than in Newtons, as was in use at the time.

A comparison with the diesel-hydraulic Class 245 locomotives—featuring a primary engine rated at 368 kW, compared to the E.323's 260 kW—revealed slightly lower performance for the E.323. This is evidenced by tractive effort curves for both locomotive types in the 0–32 km/h (0–20 mph) speed range. At speeds up to 64 km/h (40 mph), tractive effort is halved for both, although operational conditions remain essentially unchanged.

Due to the lack of official data, economic evaluation was carried out by extrapolating hourly operating costs (excluding train crew expenses) from a 1963 study comparing the electric E.321 locomotives and the diesel Class 235 locomotives. That comparison showed a 27% lower hourly operating cost for the electric locomotives (1,105 Lit/hour versus 1,530 Lit/hour).

Assuming that the operating cost of the E.323 was equivalent to that of the E.321—given the mechanical and electrical similarity—and that the Class 245 locomotives incurred higher fuel costs due to their greater engine power compared to the Class 235, it was estimated that the diesel locomotives had at least 40% higher operating costs than the electric ones, at equivalent performance.

In light of this significant cost difference, and considering that no substantial changes were required in infrastructure or service organization for electric shunting operations, the engineers at Tecnomasio Italiano Brown Boveri (TIBB) encouraged the Italian State Railways (FS) to consider expanding its electric shunting fleet. They also recommended completing yard electrification where feasible, arguing that the initial expense would be offset by lower operational costs and the longer service life of electric shunting locomotives compared to diesel units.

However, TIBB also acknowledged certain drawbacks to exclusive reliance on electric shunting, such as the necessity of maintaining a reserve fleet of fully autonomous (diesel) locomotives for emergency use during power supply failures or network maintenance. Additionally, safety regulations required a portion of yard tracks to remain non-electrified.

Ultimately, FS chose not to expand electric shunting operations beyond the planned procurement. To mitigate the risk of accidents and the resulting legal complications, FS later initiated the de-electrification of many yard sidings.

== Studies and experiments ==
In 1972, during a series of discussions between representatives of the Ferrovie dello Stato (FS) and the Institute of Automation at the Faculty of Engineering of the University of Rome "La Sapienza," an agreement was reached to experimentally convert a locomotive of the E.323 class. The objective was to replace the rotary converter and the DC traction motor with an electronic converter suitable for powering a three-phase traction motor.

This experiment was significant as it marked the first application worldwide of a three-phase traction motor on a 3 kV DC locomotive. The main technical challenges stemmed from the limitations of the power thyristors available at the time, which were suitable only for relatively low operating voltages and were highly sensitive to overvoltages. In 3,000 V DC electrification systems, such overvoltages could reach peak values of up to 12,000 V due to line inductance.

Although the use of a shunting locomotive allowed only a limited demonstration of the benefits of a three-phase motor, the decision to experiment on the E.323 class was considered a practical compromise. These locomotives were equipped with a single traction motor of relatively low power, which minimized the complexity and cost of the conversion.

Responsibilities were divided between the two institutions. The Institute of Automation was tasked with conducting the feasibility study, selecting the traction motor, designing and building a laboratory prototype of the converter, and developing the control circuits. FS was responsible for procuring the traction motor, constructing the final converter and auxiliary systems, reassembling the locomotive, and funding the entire project.

It was also agreed to precede installation on the E.323 with a ground-based experimental application, conducted by the FS Experimental Institute at the electrical substation in Rome Magliana.

The initial scope of the conversion focused solely on replacing the electrical traction equipment. However, the later decision to adopt a four-pole three-phase motor—advantageous in terms of mass and size compared to the originally planned six-pole motor—necessitated a change in the transmission ratio to accommodate the higher rotational speed.

The new traction equipment included the following components:

- a filter, serving both to protect the electronic components from line surges and to limit harmonic distortion in the traction current;
- a thyristor inverter to convert the 3 kV DC supply into three-phase AC voltage, with continuously variable amplitude (0–2.4 kV) and frequency (0.5–130 Hz);
- an automatic control circuit for the converter;
- a four-pole, three-phase asynchronous traction motor with a squirrel-cage rotor, rated at 280 kW (380 hp).

The locomotive was designed to deliver a constant tractive force, with power increasing linearly with speed up to approximately 79 kN (18,000 lbf) between 0 and 13 km/h (0.0 to 8.1 mph), and with slightly decreasing power—peaking at around 276 kW (370 hp)—from 13 km/h to the maximum speed.

Electric braking was included in the design, without energy recovery to the line, with energy dissipated through a resistor.

In 1973, FS allocated funding and studies commenced, resulting in the submission of a feasibility report in December 1974, which concluded favorably.

By mid-1977, the progress of work was as follows:

- the laboratory prototype of the electronic converter had been successfully completed;
- the converter control circuit had undergone significant refinement;
- the Magliana electrical substation had been selected as the site for installing the final converter.

Following ground testing by the FS Experimental Institute of the electronic equipment developed by the Institute of Automation, advances in power electronics—particularly in connection with the E.402 locomotive project—led to declining interest in the E.323 inverter project, which was ultimately abandoned.

== Nicknames ==
Similar to the E.322, the E.324 engine trailer was nicknamed "dog" or "doggie" due to its perceived behavior of following the E.323 locomotive, as if walking on a leash held by its master.

== Chronological summary ==
Regarding the historical data of any class of railway rolling stock, two points from the introduction by engineer Fabio Cherubini—former manager of the FS Material and Traction Service and railway author—are notable:

The greatest care has been taken to identify the builders and years of construction of individual units based on FS documents, but errors or imperfections of various origins cannot be ruled out. Even the builders' license plates do not give absolute certainty [...]

— Fabio Cherubini, Materiale, p. 7)

=== E.323 series 000 ===
E.323 locomotives not suitable for remote control of E.324
Number of service	Admission in service	Cancellation
E.323.001	1966	December 2002
E.323.002	1966	December 2002
E.323.003	1966	December 2002
E.323.004	1966	after 30/1/2000
E.323.005	1966	April 2004
E.323.006	1966	October 2002
E.323.007	1966	December 2002
E.323.008	1966	December 2003
E.323.009	1966	after 30/1/2000
E.323.010	1966	after 30/1/2000
E.323.011	1970	October 2002
E.323.012	1970	December 2002
E.323.013	1971	December 2002
E.323.014	1971	October 2002
E.323.015	1971	after 30/1/2000
E.323.016	1971	October 2002
E.323.017	1971	after 30/1/2000
E.323.018	1971	October 2002
E.323.019	1971	October 2002
E.323.020	1971	May 2003

=== E.323 and E.324 series 100 and 200 ===
E.323 locomotives suitable for remote control of E.324			E.324 locomotives assigned in pairs		
Number of service	Admission in service	Cancellation	Number of service	Admission in service	Cancellation
E.323.101	1966	after 30/1/2000	E.324.101	1966	February 2003
E.323.102	1966	after 30/1/2000	E.324.102	1966	after 30/1/2000
E.323.103	1966	after 30/1/2000	E.324.103	1966	after 30/1/2000
E.323.104	1967	August 2003	E.324.104	1967	after 30/1/2000
E.323.105	1967	preserved as historic rolling stock	E.324.105	1967	preserved as historic rolling stock
E.323.201	1971	April 2009	E.324.201	1971	April 2009
E.323.202	1971	luglio 2003	E.324.202	1971	August 2003
E.323.203	1971	April 2009	E.324.203	1971	June 2009
E.323.204	1971	December 2003	E.324.204	1971	October 2009
E.323.205	1971	April 2004	E.324.205	1971	March 2003

== See also ==
- FS Class E.321
- List of Italian rolling stock

== Bibliography ==
=== Printed sources ===
- Tomaso Zattoni; Giuseppe Maffei (February 1960). "Le locomotive elettriche di manovra a 3000 V c.c. Gr. 321 per la rete elettrificata delle F.S.". Ingegneria Ferroviaria. anno 15 (2): 105–110.
- Giancarlo Marzocchi (April 1962). "Locomotive elettriche da manovra Gr. E.321 delle Ferrovie dello Stato". Rassegna Tecnica TIBB. anno 23 (2): 25–32.
- Fernando Barenghi (1965). "Nuove locomotive elettriche da manovra per le Ferrovie dello Stato". Associazione Elettrotecnica ed Elettronica Italiana, Elettrotecnica ed elettronica nei trasporti terrestri. Rendiconti della LXVI Riunione annuale. Montecatini 1965. Vol. fasc. 2. Memorie. Milano: Associazione Elettrotecnica ed Elettronica Italiana. pp. 58/1–58/6.
- Ministero dei Trasporti e dell'Aviazione Civile – Ferrovie dello Stato (1970). Prefazione Generale all'Orario di Servizio (edizione 1963, ristampa 1970 aggiornata con O.S. nº 1/1965 – 14/1965 – 18/1965 – 26/1967 – 56/1967 – 87/1967 – 17/1968 - 34/1968 – 35/1968 - 43/1969 – 51/1969 – 65/1969 – 109/1969 – 16/1970 – 24/1970 – 38/1970 ed.). Roma: Ferrovie dello Stato.

=== Historiography and complements ===
- Erminio Mascherpa (July 1977). "Il motore trifase nel futuro della ferrovia (quinta parte)". Italmodel Ferrovie. anno 27 (206): 441–446.
- Renzo Marini (1983). "Le locomotive E.323–E.324". Le locomotive elettriche delle FS. Vol. collana Quaderni FS, nuova serie n. 3. Roma: Ufficio Relazioni Aziendali FS. pp. 85–87.
- Giovanni Cornolò; Claudio Pedrazzini (1983). Locomotive elettriche FS. Parma: Ermanno Albertelli. pp. 213–215.
- Giuseppe Sergi (November 1985). "Tra Scilla e Cariddi". Voies ferrées edizione italiana. anno 4 (24): 22–25. ISSN 0392-9817.
- Roberto Rolle (January 1986). "Le E.321-322, approfondimento a corredo dell'articolo "OGR Verona"". Voies ferrées edizione italiana. anno 5 (25): 11. ISSN 0392-9817.
- Angelo Nascimbene (January 1986). "Dove e quante". Voies ferrées edizione italiana. anno 5 (25): 92–93. ISSN 0392-9817.
- Giovanni Cornolò (1994). Locomotive elettriche FS. Parma: Ermanno Albertelli. pp. 291–293.
- David Haydock (1995). Italian Railways. Locomotives and multiple units. Sheffield: Platform 5. pp. 23–24.
- Ettore Caliri (January 1997). "Treni sulle navi". I Treni. anno 18 (178): 23–27. ISSN 0392-4602.
- Tiziano Croce (July 1997). "E 321 – E 323, manovre col "cane"". Tutto Treno. anno 10 (100): 48–53. ISSN 1124-4232.
- Stefano Patelli (May 2000). "Il comando multiplo nelle FS". Tutto Treno. anno 13 (131): 20–29. ISSN 1124-4232.
- Fabio Cherubini (2000). Materiale motore FS 2000. Salò: Editrice Trasporti su Rotaie. pp. 7, 12, 24–25, 52.
- Voltan, Luigi; Nascimbene, Angelo (February 2006). "80 anni di locomotive elettriche FS a corrente continua". Tutto Treno Tema. anno 18 (21): 48–49. ISSN 1124-4232.
- Giovanni Cornolò (2008). Dall'E.626 all'Eurostar. 1928-2008: ottant'anni di locomotive elettriche FS. Parma: Ermanno Albertelli. pp. 296–302.
- Luca Vanni (2011). Materiale di trazione elettrico. Albino: Sandit. pp. 304–315.
