= FS Class 940 =

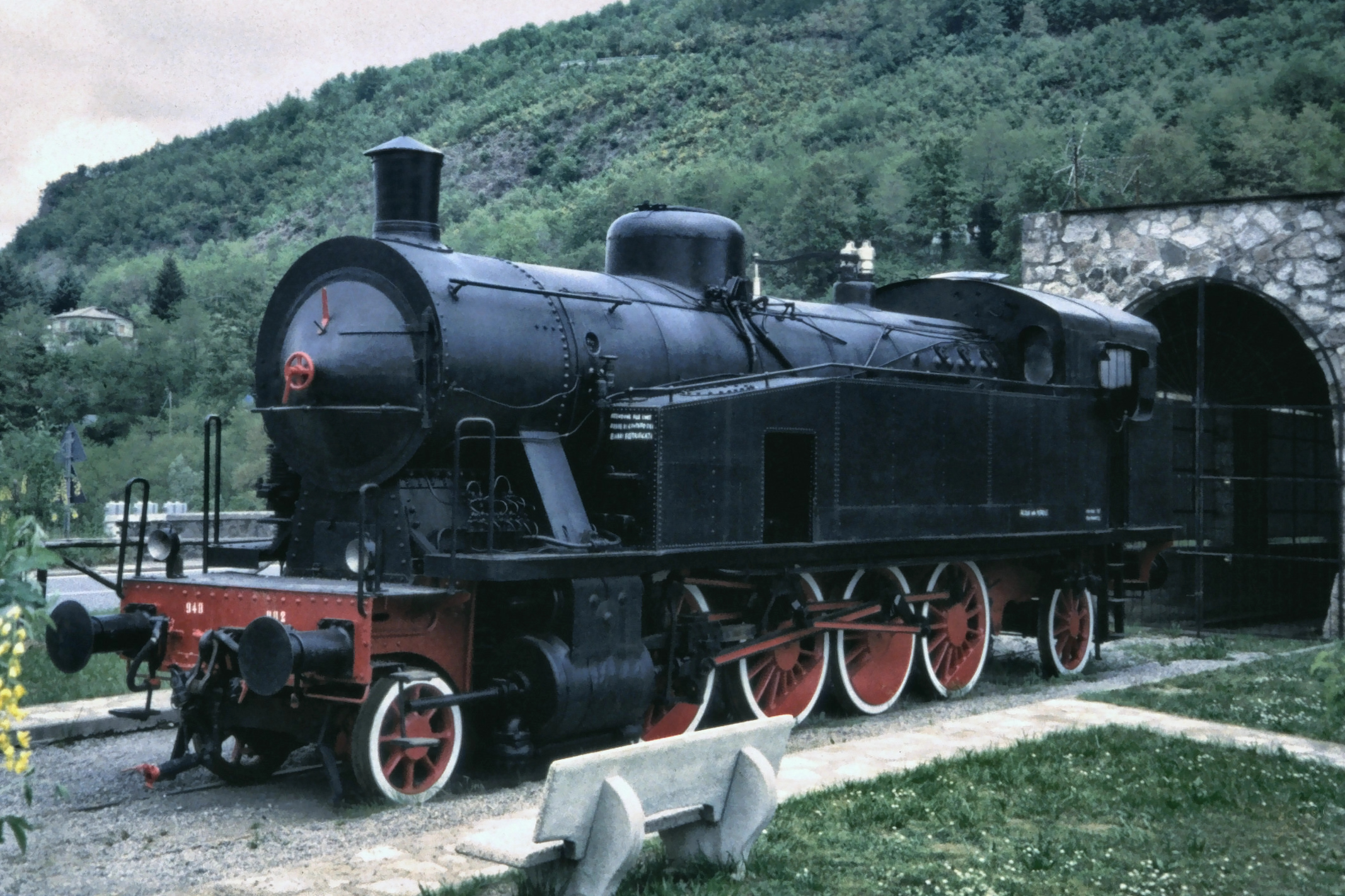
- FS locomotive 940.002 preserved at Piazza al Serchio
Type and origin
- Power type: Steam
- Builder: Officine Meccaniche (7); Reggiane (20); Officine Meccaniche e Navali di Napoli (26)
- Build date: 1922–1924
- Total produced: 53
Specifications
- Configuration
  - Whyte: 2-8-2T
  - UIC: 1′D1′ h2t
- Gauge: 1,435 mm (4 ft 8 1/2 in)
- Leading dia.: 860 mm (33 7/8 in)
- Driver dia.: 1,370 mm (53 7/8 in)
- Trailing dia.: 1,110 mm (43 3/4 in)
- Length: 13,178 mm (43 ft 2 7/8 in)
- Axle load: 15.4 tonnes (15.2 long tons; 17.0 short tons)
- Adhesive weight: 61.6 tonnes (60.6 long tons; 67.9 short tons)
- Loco weight: 87.3 tonnes (85.9 long tons; 96.2 short tons)
- Fuel type: Coal
- Fuel capacity: 3,500 kg (7,700 lb)
- Water cap.: 10,000 litres (2,200 imp gal; 2,600 US gal)
- Firebox
  - Grate area: 2.8 m^{2} (30 sq ft)
- Boiler pressure: 12 kg/cm^{2} (1.18 MPa; 171 psi)
- Heating surface: 152.92 m^{2} (1,646.0 sq ft)
- Superheater
  - Heating area: 41.23 m^{2} (443.8 sq ft)
- Cylinders: Two, outside
- Cylinder size: 540 mm × 700 mm (21 1/4 in × 27 9/16 in)
- Valve gear: Walschaerts
Performance figures
- Maximum speed: 65 km/h (40 mph)
- Power output: 980 PS (967 hp; 721 kW)
- Tractive effort: 13,500 kgf (132 kN; 29,800 lbf)

The Ferrovie dello Stato Italiane (FS; Italian State Railways) Class 940 (Italian: Gruppo 940) is a 2-8-2 steam tank locomotive, derived from the Class 740 tender locomotive.

== Design ==
The Class 940 was designed for the Apennine Mountains railways, and especially for the Rome-Sulmona-Pescara line, an important coast-to-coast railway that presented steep gradients (up to 2.7%); until then those had been served by 0-6-0 locomotives such as the FS Class 851, that had become inadequate for the increasing needs. Therefore, it was decided to build a locomotive with eight driving wheels, by adapting the frames, the boiler and the engine of the Class 740 to a tank design, also adding a trailing wheel to the wheelbase to enable the new design to run well backwards as well as forwards.

The locomotives were built from 1922 to 1924 by the Officine Meccaniche, Reggiane and the Officine Meccaniche e Navali di Napoli, for a total of 50.

== Service and modifications ==
Initially, most of the class was allocated to the Sulmona shed for service on the trans-apennine railway; after World War II (in which four locomotives ended up remaining in Yugoslavian territory, and being taken up by the Yugoslav Railways as JŽ 118 001-4), the Class was dispersed in many sheds throughout Italy. Since 1968 improved draughting and a larger chimney were fitted.

In 1951 three locomotives identical to the Class 940 but built in 1924 for the Ferrovie Elettriche Biellesi, numbered 941–943, were taken over by the FS, when the company was absorbed, and were given the running numbers from 940.051 to 940.053, therefore bringing to 53 the nominal total for the class.

The Class 940 was a successful design, that remained in service till the end of regular steam services on the FS network, mostly for freight service but also for passenger trains and heavy shunting duties.

== Preservation ==
Eighteen Class 940 survived into preservation; currently, only the 041 and the 006 are operational and available for heritage trains, while others (such as the 022 and the 036) are undergoing maintenance.
