= Bologna San Donato railway test circuit =

Railway test circuit in Bologna, Italy

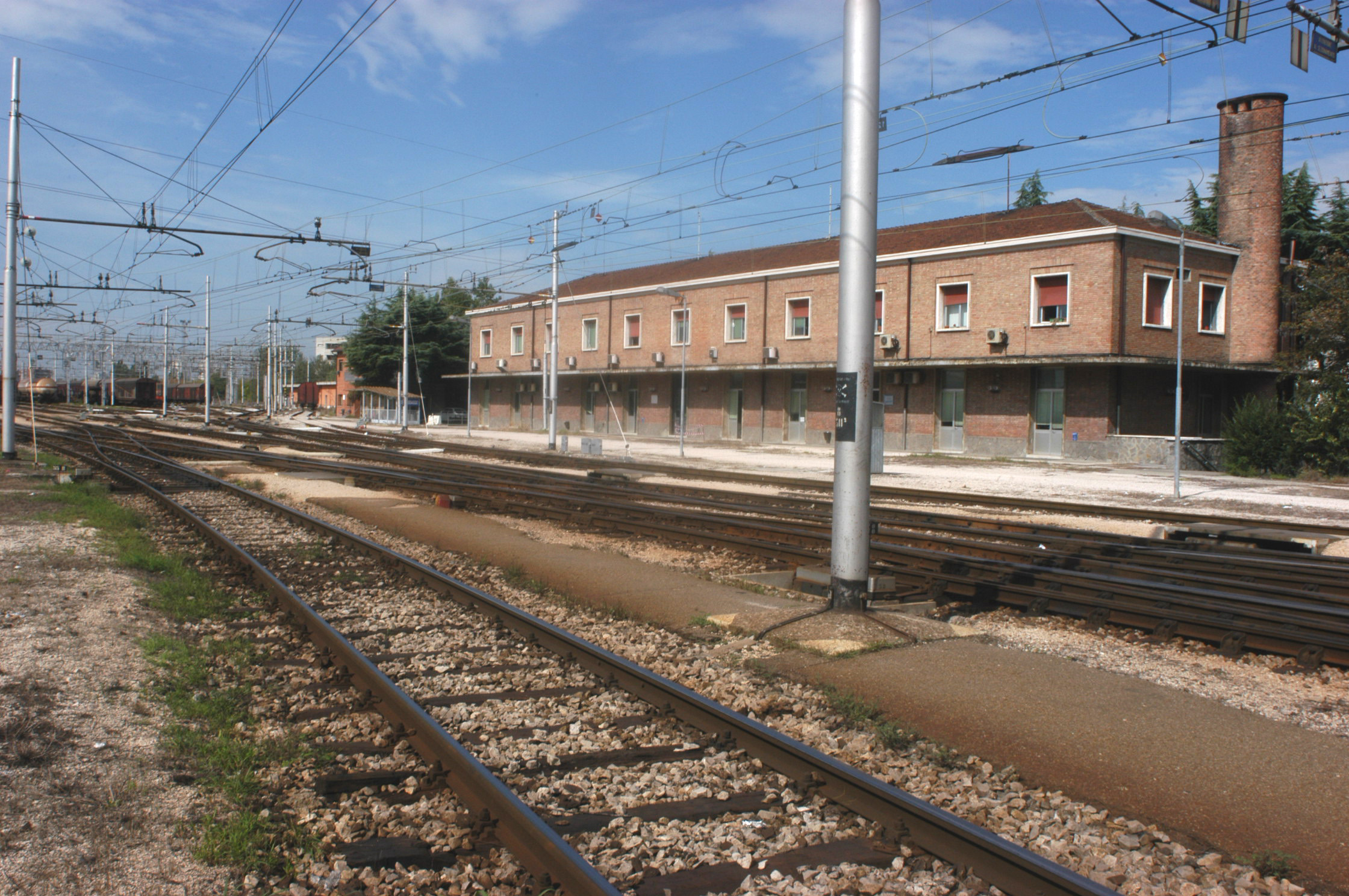
Posto B

The Bologna San Donato railway test circuit (Italian: Circuito ferroviario di prova di Bologna San Donato) is a railway rolling stock testing facility located in Bologna, Emilia-Romagna, Italy.

The facility started operating in 1942 as a freight yard. For decades, it was the largest Italian railway freight yard in terms of size and traffic. It was made up of 4 main beams, for a total length of approximately 4 km: the arrivals beam (Italian: fascio arrivi), the direction beam (Italian: fascio direzioni), the North departures beam (Italian: fascio partenze nord) and the South departures beam (Italian: fascio partenze sud). It also featured secondary beams.

It is connected to the Bologna ring railway.

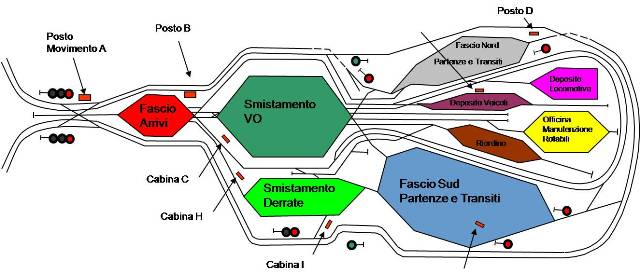
Schematic plan

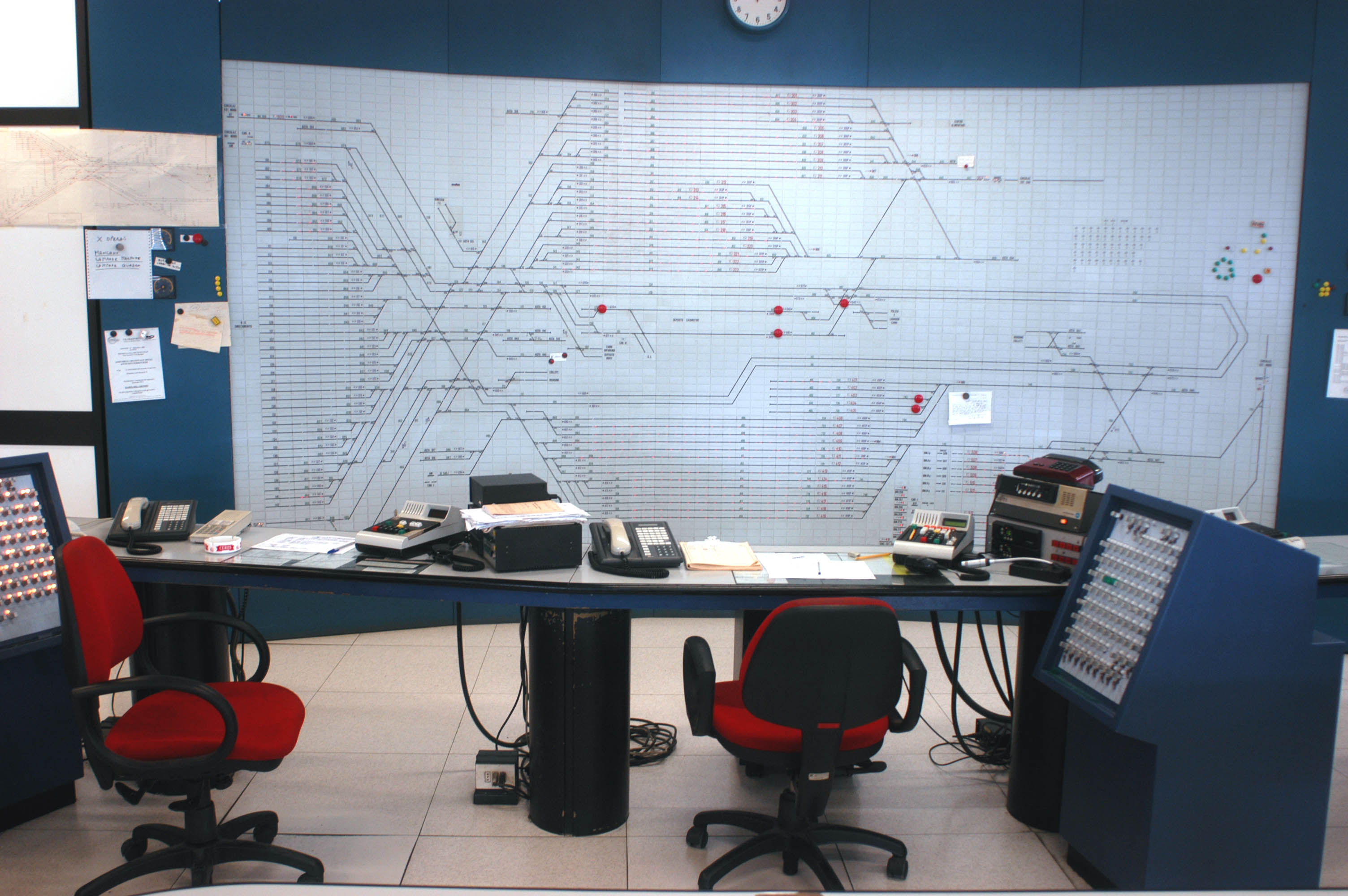
Control room

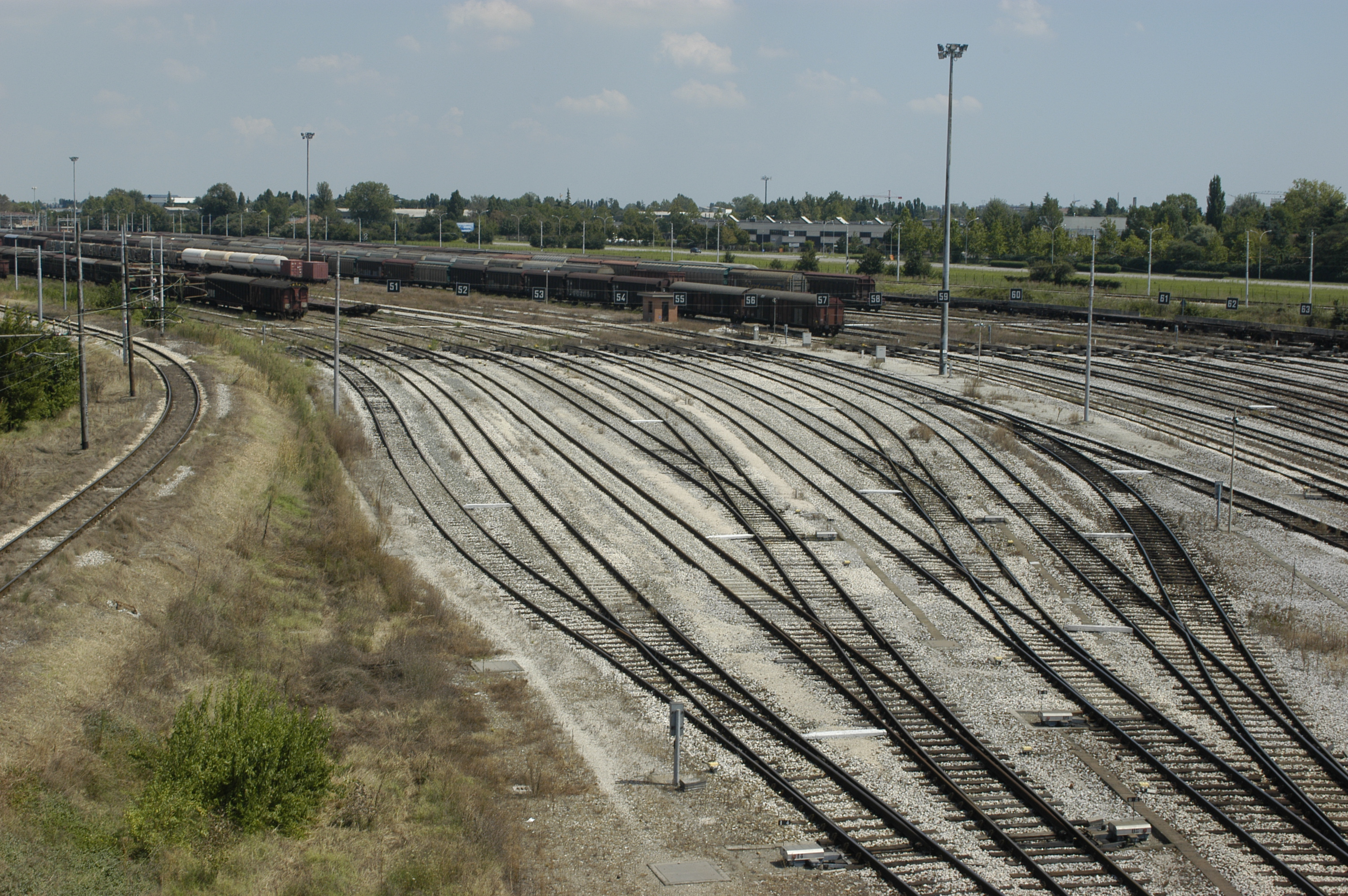
Tracks and rolling stock

The freight yard saw a progressive decline in traffic as early as the 1990s, mainly due to changes in transport policies, which began to favor freight transport on complete trains and the use of freight villages. The launch saddles in Bologna San Donato were closed in 2012; from that moment on, the yard only hosted trains that were carrying out re-composition maneuvers, and it soon became a depot for rolling stock awaiting demolition.

At the beginning of 2018, the decision was made to repurpose the external circulation circuit and build a new curve, so as to form a closed railway path, consisting of an oval about 6 km in length, to be used as a test railway circuit. The first train traveled the new test track on 15 October 2018.

The circuit measures 5759 m in length, of which approximately 2000 m are double tracked. Rails are of the UNI 60 type. The power supply is 3 kV DC.

The maximum speed on the circuit is 120 km/h, which can be increased to 140.

The circuit currently allows test runs of new rolling stock; it also allows testing of rolling stock without a certificate of admission to service from the Italian National Agency for Railway Safety, as the circuit is outside the national railway infrastructure.
