= FS Class 290 =

RA Class 350 bis FS Class 290
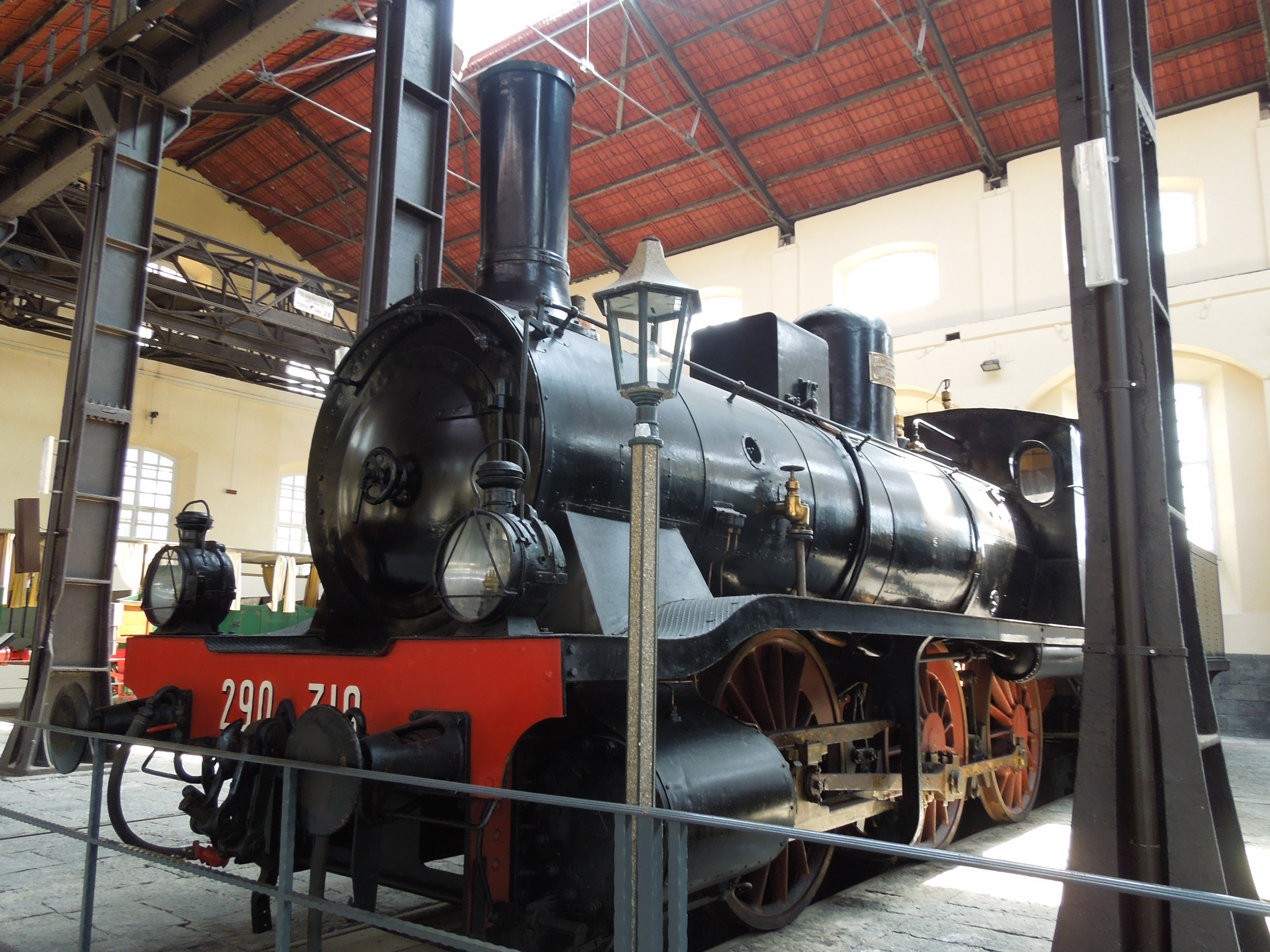
- FS locomotive 290.319 as preserved
Type and origin
- Power type: Steam
- Builder: Borsig, Costruzioni Meccaniche di Saronno, Breda, Henschel & Son, Ansaldo, Miani & Silvestri, Maffei, MÁVAG, Maschinenfabrik Esslingen
- Build date: 1899-1913
- Total produced: 338
Specifications
- Configuration
  - UIC: C'n2
- Gauge: 1,435 mm (4 ft 8 1/2 in)
- Driver dia.: 1,510 mm (59.45 in)
- Length: 15,800 mm (51 ft 10 in)
- Axle load: 14.7 tonnes (14.5 long tons; 16.2 short tons)
- Loco weight: 43.8 tonnes (43.1 long tons; 48.3 short tons)
- Tender weight: 29.9 tonnes (29.4 long tons; 33.0 short tons)
- Fuel type: Coal
- Fuel capacity: 4,000 kg (8,800 lb)
- Water cap.: 12,000 L (2,600 imp gal; 3,200 US gal)
- Firebox
  - Grate area: 2.03 m^{2} (21.9 sq ft)
- Boiler pressure: 12 kg/cm^{2} (1.18 MPa; 171 psi)
- Heating surface: 120.88 m^{2} (1,301.1 sq ft)
- Cylinders: Two, outside
- Cylinder size: 355 mm × 650 mm (13.98 in × 25.59 in)
- Valve gear: Stephenson
Performance figures
- Maximum speed: 60 km/h (37 mph)
- Power output: 500 PS (368 kW; 493 hp)
- Tractive effort: 8,740 kgf (85.7 kN; 19,300 lbf)

The Ferrovie dello Stato Italiane (FS; Italian State Railways) Class 290 (Italian: Gruppo 290), formerly the Rete Adriatica Class 350 bis, is a 0-6-0 steam locomotive.

== Design and construction ==
The Class 290 was a development of the earlier Class 270 locomotives, studied under the Rete Adriatica; it kept the wheelbase, but replaced the boiler with a slightly bigger one, with a minimally coned rear ring. Its construction was continued under the new FS management, which made it one of its twelve standard designs; it was the last and most successful 0-6-0 Italian locomotive.

The class was built by several Italian and foreign manufacturers, between 1899 and 1913. The first 30 locomotives were fitted with a two-axle tender, with a coal capacity of 3,400 kg (7,500 lb) and a water capacity of 8,000 L (1,800 imp gal; 2,100 US gal); the subsequent ones were fitted with the three-axle tender that would see widespread service under the FS (especially behind the Class 625 and Class 640 locomotives).

The first 112 locomotives were classified as Class RA 350 bis (with running numbers between 3631 and 3742); of these, 52 were taken over by the FS in July 1905 upon formation, while the other 60 were taken over by the new Strade Ferrate Meridionali (Southern Railways), a rump of the RA, until its incorporation with the FS in July 1906.

== Service ==
The class saw widespread service on the Italian network, with the first members of the class being sent to work as helpers on the steep lines around Fabriano and Sulmona.

Some locomotives were withdrawn relatively early, but as many as 60 were still active after World War II; however, their activity ceased by the end of the 1950s.

== Preservation ==
The last member of the class to remain active, the 290.319, survived into preservation; it is currently kept in the Pietrarsa railway museum.
