= FS Class 830 I =

Italian steam locomotive used for shunting (1903–1940)

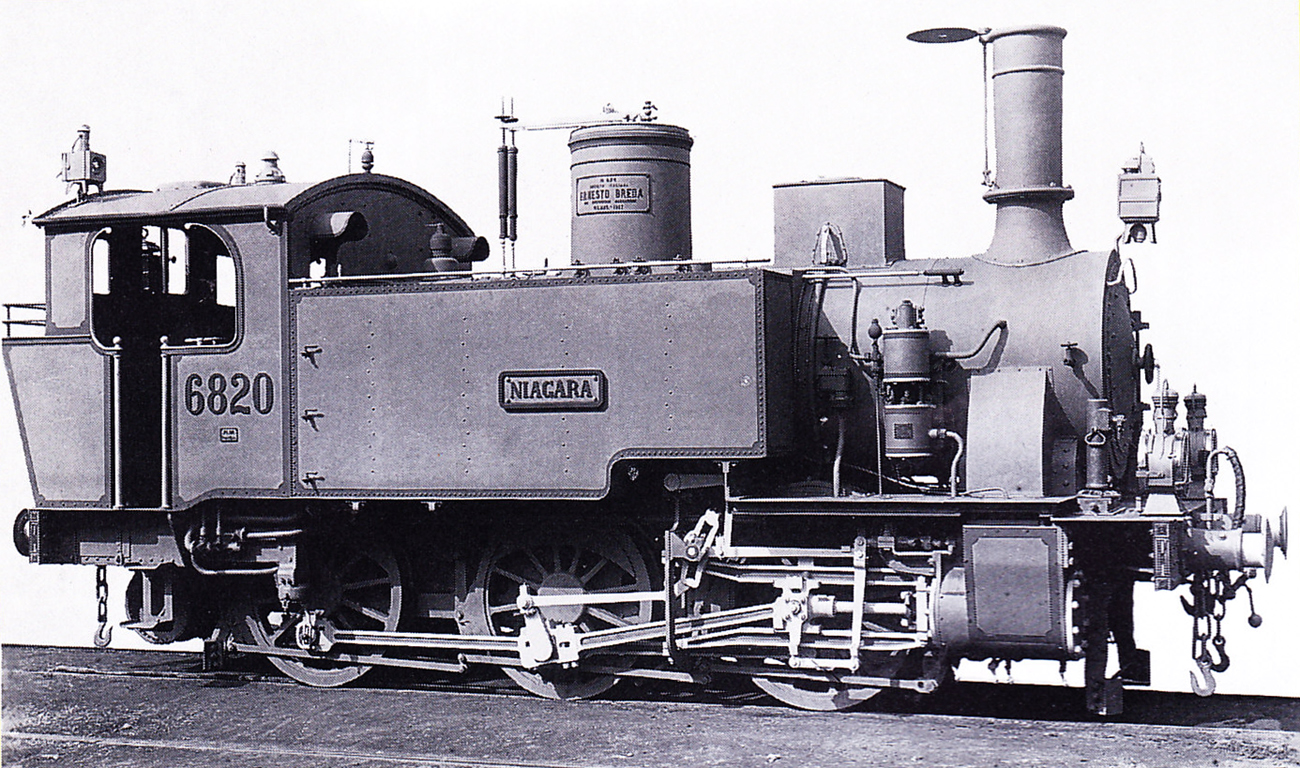
- RM 6820 "Niagara" locomotive, later FS 830.014, brand new in 1903
Type and origin
- Power type: Steam
- Builder: Breda
- Build date: 1903–1906
- Total produced: 44
Specifications
- Configuration
  - Whyte: 0-6-0T
- Gauge: 1,435 mm (4 ft 8 1/2 in)
- Coupled dia.: 1,310 millimetres (4.30 ft)
- Length: 8,960 millimetres (29.40 ft)
- Width: 4,205 millimetres (13.796 ft)
- Loco weight: 45.2 tonnes (100,000 lb)
- Cylinders: Two, outside
Performance figures
- Tractive effort: 6,300 kg (13,900 lb)
Career
- Operators: Italian State Railways
- Withdrawn: 1940
- Preserved: 5

The FS Class 830 was a series of 0-6-0T tank locomotives used by the Italian State Railways (FS) for shunting duties from 1903 to the 1940s. Initially built for the Rete Mediterranea (RM) as RM 6807–6820, these locomotives were closely related to the earlier RM 6801-6806, later FS 829 and served as the direct predecessors to the FS 835. Some components of decommissioned FS 830 locomotives were repurposed for constructing locomotives of the FS 234 and E.321 and E.322 groups.

== History ==
=== Design and construction ===
The FS Class 830 locomotives were designed by the Technical Office in Turin of the Rete Mediterranea. Based on the earlier RM 6801–6806, the first batch of 14 locomotives, numbered RM 6807–6820, was delivered in 1903. Following the nationalization of the railways in 1905, the Italian State Railways commissioned an additional 30 units between 1905 and 1906. These 44 locomotives formed the FS Class 830, initially numbered 8301–8344, and from 1918, renumbered as 830.001–044. They were primarily assigned to shunting duties at locomotive depots in Turin, Alessandria, and Novara. By December 31, 1922, their distribution included Turin Smistamento (26), Casale Monferrato (2), Novara (12), Bra (2), and Asti (2).

=== Decommissioning ===
Decommissioning of the FS Class 830 began in the 1930s. Several units were transferred to private railway companies, public entities, or industrial firms for shunting and line services. In 1952, four units (830.007, 010, 016, and 021) were sold to Impresa Lagorara (IL), which operated shunting services at the port of Genoa alongside Impresa Manovre & Affini (IMA). When FS assumed control of these operations in 1969, these locomotives were reacquired and integrated into a new FS Class 830 group, with renumbering that coincidentally preserved the original registration for 830.007. These reacquired units were decommissioned by 1971. Additionally, in 1952, IMA purchased five FS 830 locomotives, which were not reacquired by FS in 1969.

Other units were transferred to various entities. In 1936, two locomotives, including 830.001, were sold to Cockitalia for use at its Bragno plant siding. Additional units were transferred to Montecatini and ILVA. Between 1939 and 1941, eleven units were assigned to the Ministry of the Navy for arsenal sidings, with 830.039 still in service at La Spezia in 1969. From 1939 to 1942, units 830.021 and 042 were leased to Ferrovie Torino Nord for line services. The 830.006 remained operational as late as January 1987.

The FS Class 830 design influenced the development of the more numerous FS Class 835. Frames and wheel arrangements from some decommissioned 830s were reused to construct locomotives of the FS Class 234, E.321, and E.322 groups.

== Technical details ==
The FS Class 830 locomotives were saturated steam locomotives with simple-expansion, twin-cylinder engines. They were divided into two subgroups:

- 830.001–014: The initial batch, based on the RM 6807–6820 design.
- 830.015–044: A later batch with a longer frame for larger coal bunkers and a wider chimney to enhance boiler performance.

The boiler, larger than that of the FS Class 829 due to additional fire tubes, produced approximately 7% more steam. During major repairs, some units were fitted with boilers from the FS Class 835 (specifically subgroup 835.317–370), which were later standardized across the 835 group.

== Preservation ==
Several FS Class 830 locomotives are preserved in museums across Italy:

- RM 6807 (FS 830.001), built by Breda in 1902, located at Italiana Coke, Vado Ligure (Savona).
- RM 6812 (FS 830.006), built by Breda in 1902 (construction number 618), displayed at "Casello 33" of the former Ferrara-Modena railway, Ravarino (Modena).
- RM 6816 (FS 830.010), built by Breda in 1902 (construction number 622), preserved at the Center for the History of Railways and Tramways, Bologna.
- FS 830.017, built by Breda in 1906 (construction number 758), exhibited at the Ex-Breda Industrial Archaeological Park, Sesto San Giovanni.
- FS 830.035, built by Breda in 1906 (construction number 776), located at Selva Pergusina Park, Pergusa (Enna).

== Bibliography ==
=== Printed sources ===
- Corbellini, Guido (1955). "Il cinquantenario delle Ferrovie dello Stato" [The fiftieth anniversary of the Italian State Railways]. Ingegneria Ferroviaria. 9 (5–6): 333–528. [reprinted in volume: Rome, Collegio Ingegneri Ferroviari Italiani, 1955; Rome, Collegio Ingegneri Ferroviari Italiani-Ponte San Nicolò, Duegi, 2005, ISBN 88-900979-0-6].
- Diegoli, Manlio (1961). "La trazione a vapore" [Steam traction]. Ingegneria Ferroviaria. 16 (7–8): 671–680.
- Ferrovie dello Stato. Direzione generale. Servizio Trazione (1915). Album dei tipi delle locomotive ed automotrici [Album of locomotive and railcar types]. Florence: Ferrovie dello Stato. FS Album. Anastatic reprint: Colleferro, Editrice di storia dei trasporti, 1979; Ponte San Nicolò, Duegi, 2005.

=== Historiography and additional sources ===
- Briano, Italo (1977). "Le vicende" [The events]. Storia delle ferrovie in Italia [History of railways in Italy]. Vol. 1. Milan: Cavallotti.
- Briano, Italo (1977). "La tecnica 1" [The technology 1]. Storia delle ferrovie in Italia [History of railways in Italy]. Vol. 2. Milan: Cavallotti.
- Castiglioni, Franco (1992). Vapore 1992. Le locomotive conservate in Italia. Musei, monumenti e vapore attivo [Steam 1992. Preserved locomotives in Italy. Museums, monuments, and active steam]. Turin: Gulliver. ISBN 88-85361-39-0. SBN LO10886442.
- Castiglioni, Franco (2016). "FS Gr. 830. Il gruppo che visse due volte" [FS Gr. 830. The group that lived twice]. Tutto Treno. 29 (304): 16–23.
- Cornolò, Giovanni (1998). Locomotive a vapore FS [FS steam locomotives] (2 ed.). Parma: Ermanno Albertelli. ISBN 88-85909-91-4.
- Kalla-Bishop, Peter Michael (1986). Italian State Railways steam locomotives. Abingdon: R. Tourret. pp. 68–69. ISBN 0-905878-03-5.
- Mascherpa, Erminio (1995). "Mille facce dell'835" [A thousand faces of the 835]. I Treni. 17 (168): 14–26.
- Nascimbene, Angelo; Riccardi, Aldo (1995). FS anni '50, Prima parte: Trazione a vapore e Diesel [FS in the '50s, Part One: Steam and Diesel Traction]. Albignasego: Duegi.
- Nascimbene, Angelo; Riccardi, Aldo (2005). "1905-2005. Cento anni di locomotive a vapore delle Ferrovie dello Stato" [1905-2005. One hundred years of Italian State Railways steam locomotives]. Tutto Treno Tema (20): 53–56, 59.
- Tourret, R. (1995). Allied military locomotives of the Second World War. Abingdon: R. Tourret. ISBN 0-905878-06-X.
