= FS Class E.320 =

FS class E.320
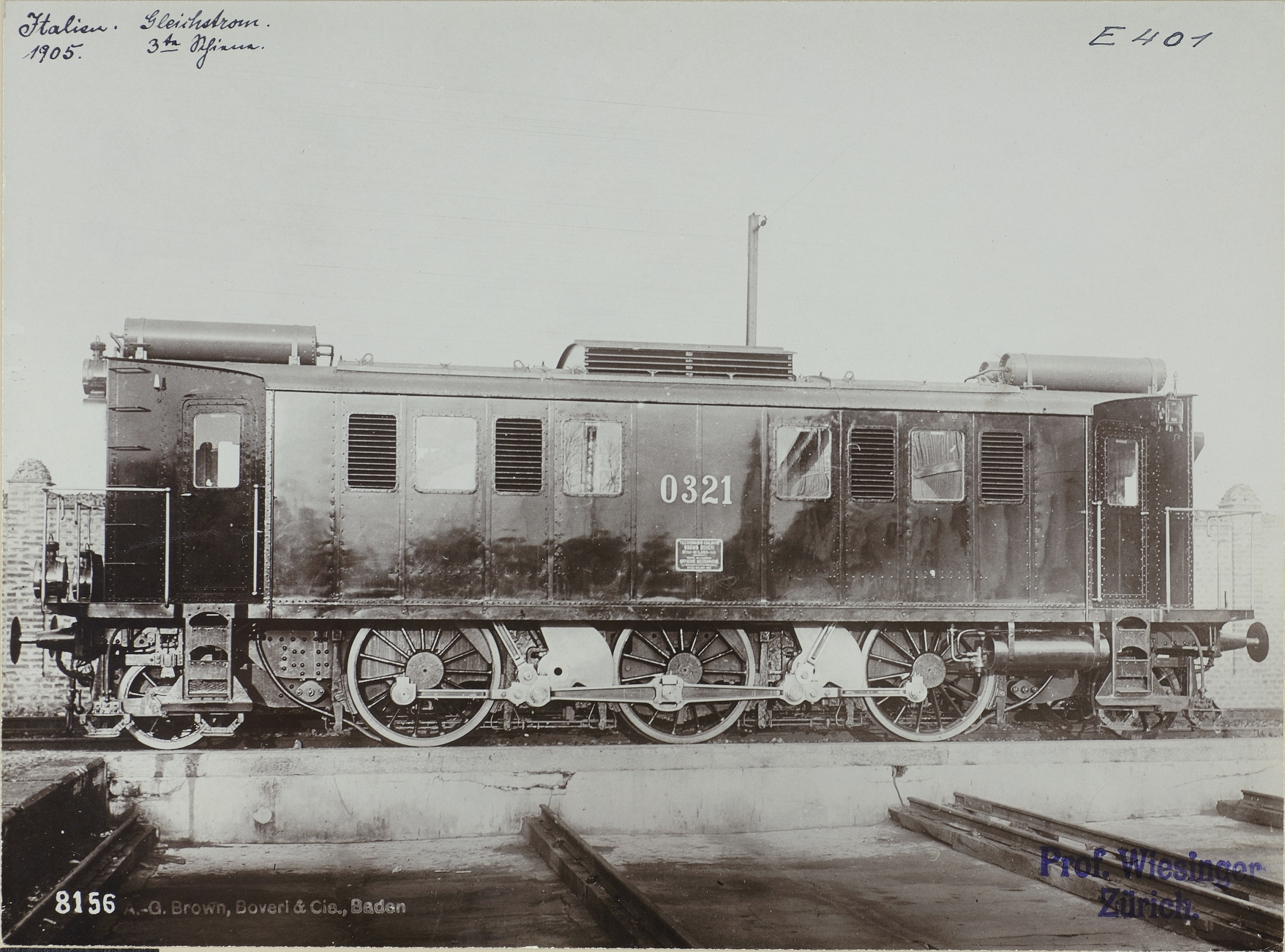
- No. 0321
Type and origin
- Power type: Electric
- Builder: OM, TIBB
- Build date: 1915-1918
- Total produced: 5
Specifications
- Configuration
  - AAR: 1-C-1
  - UIC: 1′C1′
- Gauge: 1,435 mm (4 ft 8 1/2 in) standard gauge
- Wheel diameter: 1,500 mm (59.06 in)
- Length: 12.77 m (41 ft 10 3/4 in)
- Loco weight: 71.8 t (70.7 long tons; 79.1 short tons)
- Electric system/s: 650 V DC
- Current pickup(s): Third rail
- Traction motors: DC
Performance figures
- Maximum speed: 95 km/h (59 mph)
- Power output: 1,100 kW (1,480 hp)
Career
- Operators: FS
- Disposition: Disposed

The FS Class E.320 was a class of Italian third rail electric locomotive built between 1915 and 1918. Five units were built and they saw service on the Varese - Milan - Porto Ceresio line. They were powered by two direct current electric motors, designed by Tecnomasio Italiano-Brown-Boveri (TIBB), giving a maximum speed of 95 km/h (59 mph). The final assembly and the mechanical design were by Officine Meccaniche (OM). At the time of their construction they were the most powerful direct current locomotives in the world. The transmission of the motion to the three axles was by connecting rods and these were subject to frequent breakages.

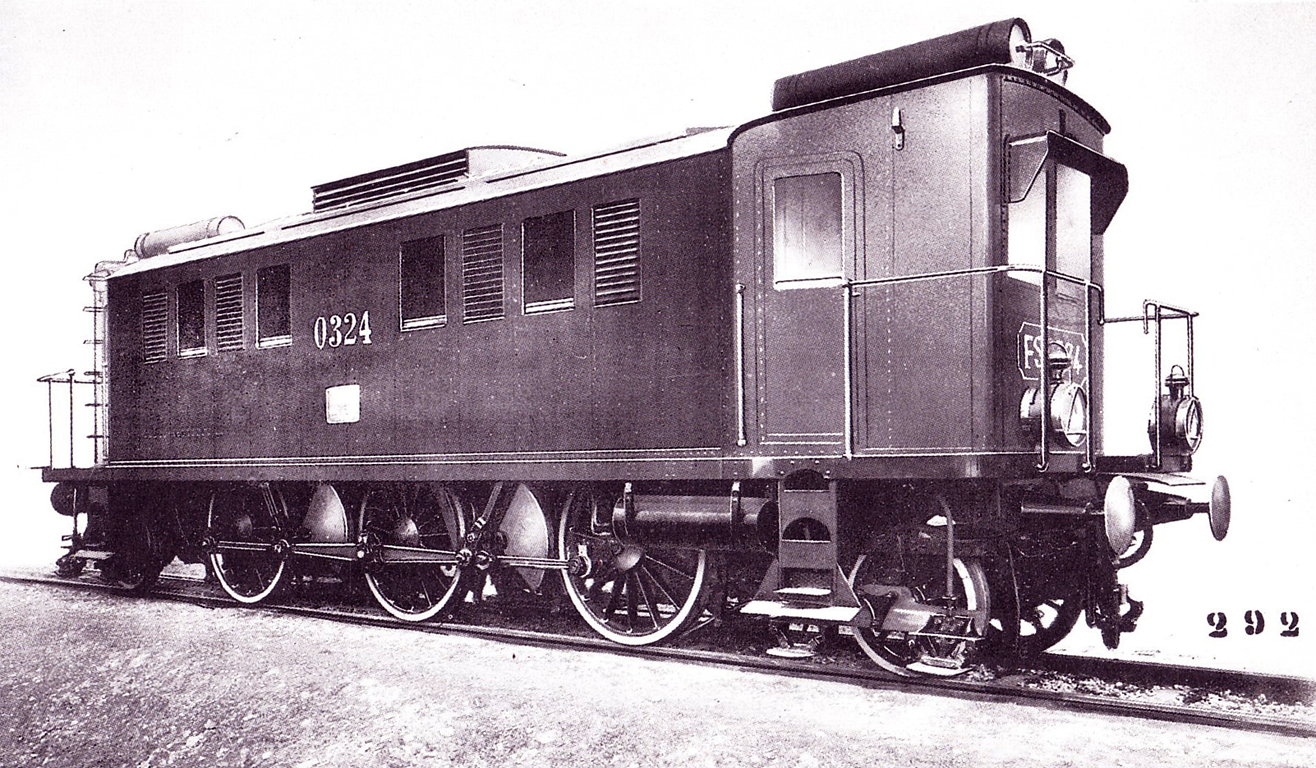

The locomotives were soon replaced by Class E.321.

== Sources ==
- Cornolò, Giovanni (1983). Locomotive elettriche FS (in Italian). Parma: Ermanno Albertelli Editore. pp. 33–38.
