= Fossalta di Portogruaro =

- Comune
- Comune di Fossalta di Portogruaro
- Coat of arms

- Location within Italy Location within Veneto
- Coordinates: 45°47′N 12°55′E
- Country: Italy
- Region: Veneto
- Metropolitan city: Venice (VE)
- Frazioni: Alvisopoli, Fratta, Gorgo, Sacilato, Stiago, Vado, Viatte-Torresella, Villanova Santa Margherita, Villanova Sant'Antonio

Government
  - Mayor: Annamaria Ambrosio

Area
  - Total: 32 km^{2} (12 sq mi)
- Elevation: 9 m (30 ft)

Population (2023)
  - Total: 5,731
  - Density: 180/km^{2} (460/sq mi)
- Demonym: Fossaltesi
- Time zone: UTC+1 (CET)
  - Summer (DST): UTC+2 (CEST)
- Postal code: 30025
- Dialing code: 0421
- Website: Official website

Fossalta di Portogruaro is a town in the Metropolitan City of Venice, Veneto, Italy. It lies south of A4, some 80 km east of Venice.
