= FS Class E.321 =

FS class E.321/E.322
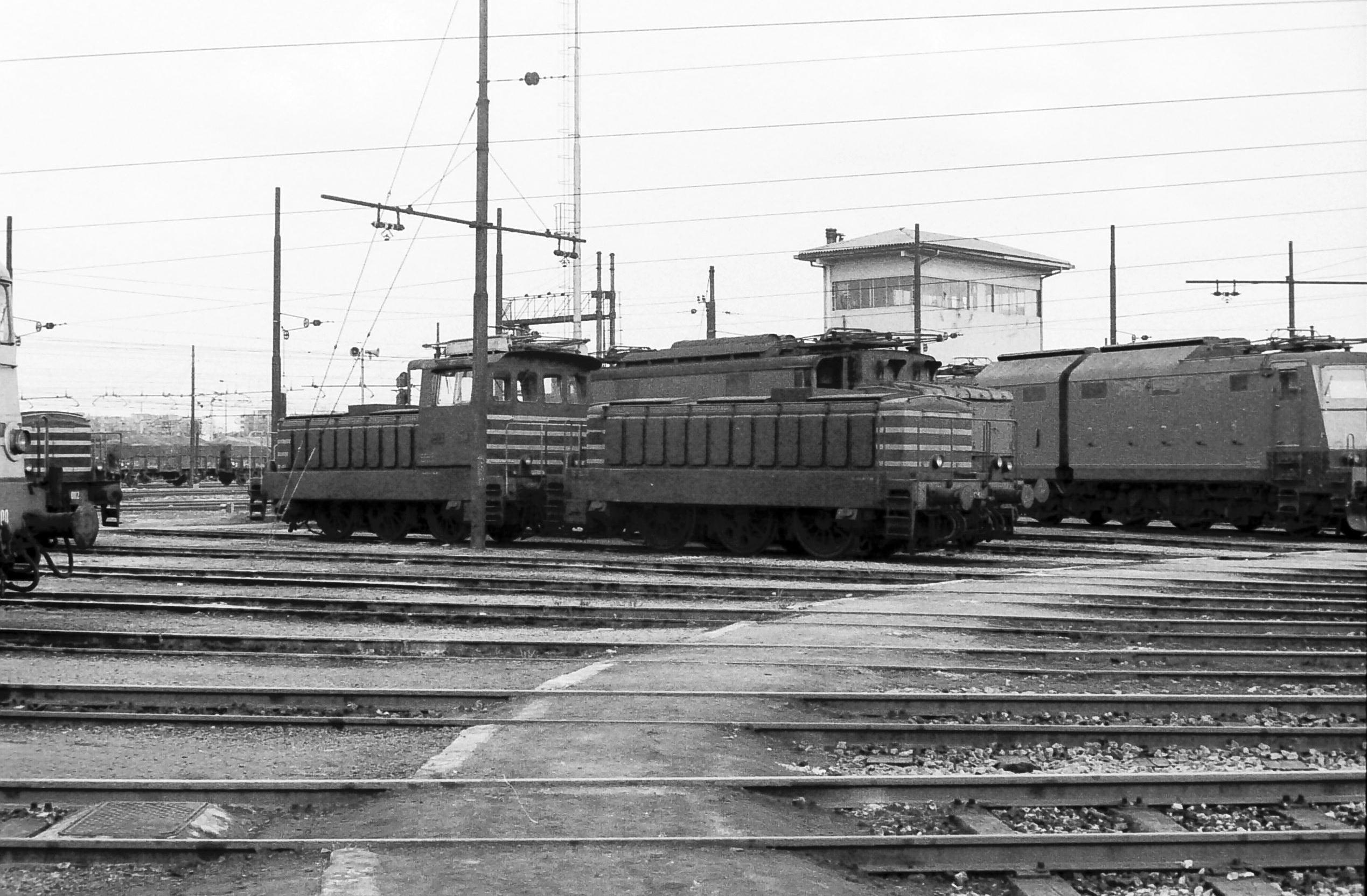
Type and origin
- Power type: Electric
- Builder: Officine Grandi Riparazioni FS, TIBB
- Build date: E.321: 1959-1963; E.322: 1961-1964
- Total produced: 40 (E.322); 20 (E.322)
Specifications
- Configuration
  - Whyte: 0-6-0OE
  - AAR: C
  - UIC: C
- Gauge: 1,435 mm (4 ft 8 1/2 in) standard gauge
- Wheel diameter: 1,310 mm (51.57 in)
- Length: 9.160 m (30 ft 5/8 in)
- Width: 2.900 m (9 ft 6 1/8 in)
- Height: 3.700 m (12 ft 1 5/8 in)
- Loco weight: 36 t (35.4 long tons; 39.7 short tons)
- Electric system/s: 3000 V DC Catenary
- Current pickup: Pantograph
- Traction motors: DC
Performance figures
- Maximum speed: 50 km/h (31 mph)
- Power output: 210 kW (280 hp)
Career
- Operators: FS
- Disposition: Retired

The Class E.321 was an Italian shunting locomotive built from 1959 to 1964. The similar Class E.322 used the same chassis and electric power plan but had no cabin, and was coupled with E.321 to give more output. Both classes were in service with the Ferrovie dello Stato from 1960 until 2002.

These locomotives were the base for the E.323 and E.324 classes, which used the same electric part but with a new mechanic one. The E.321/322s were phased out starting from the late 1980s, being replaced by the diesel shunters D.145, which could also be used for hauling light/medium weight freight trains.

== Sources ==
- Cornolò, Giovanni (1983). Locomotive elettriche FS. Parma: Ermanno Albertelli Editore. pp. 33–38.
