= Taormina–Giardini railway station =

Railway station in Messina, Italy

Taormina–Giardini Naxos
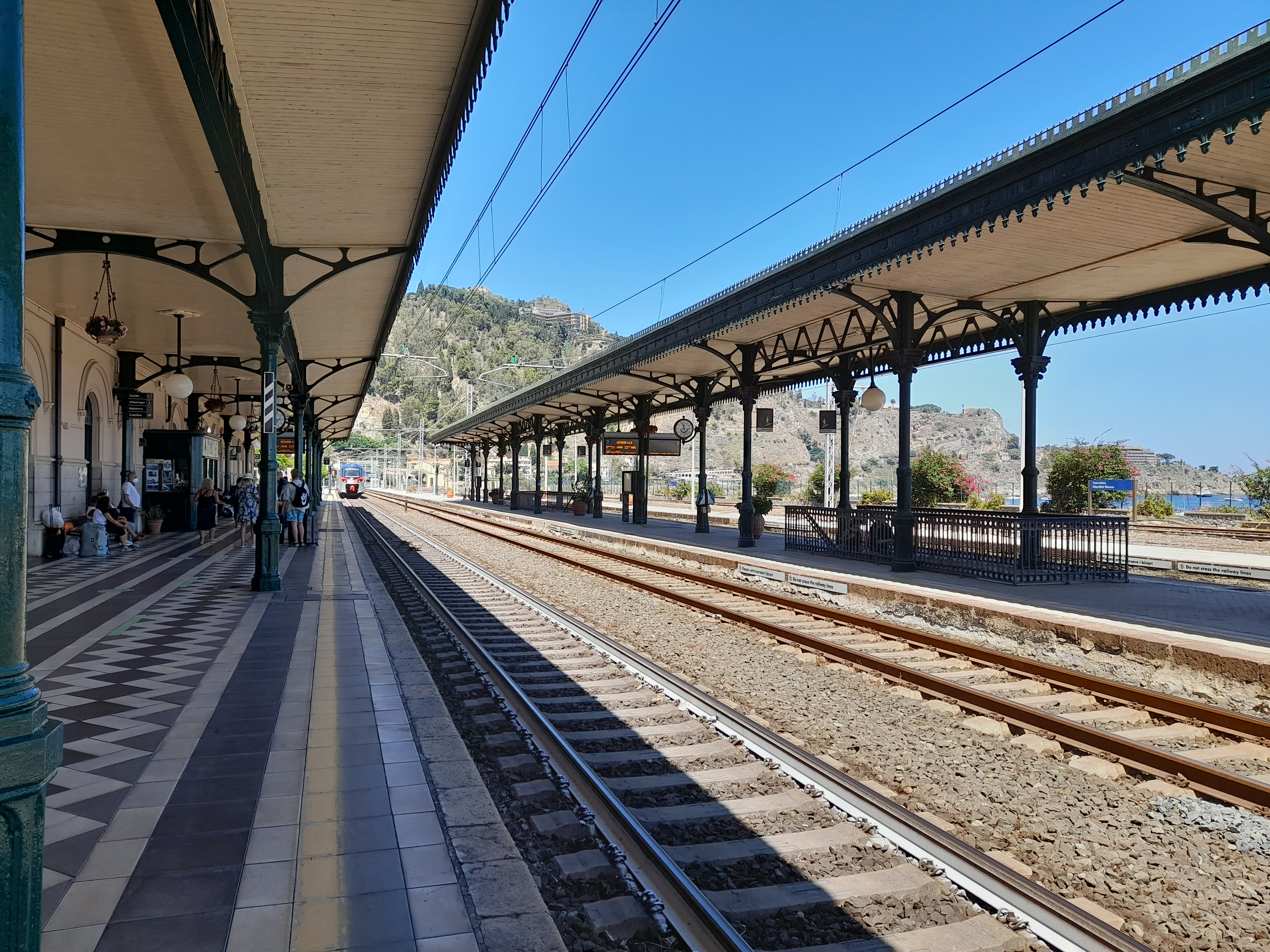

General information
- Location: Via Nazionale 23; Taormina, Metropolitan City of Messina, Sicily; Italy
- Coordinates: 37°50′43.92″N 15°16′57.07″E
- Owner: Rete Ferroviaria Italiana
- Operator: Trenitalia
- Line: Messina–Syracuse railway
- Platforms: 2
- Tracks: 3
- Train operators: Trenitalia

Other information
- Classification: Silver

History
- Opened: 12 December 1866; 159 years ago
- Rebuilt: 1926–1928
- Former names: Giardini (1866–1928)

Services
Preceding station	Trenitalia	Following station
Messina Centrale towards Milano Centrale	InterCity Notte; Milan–Syracuse	Giarre–Riposto towards Siracusa
Letojanni towards Messina Centrale	Regionale; Messina–Syracuse	Alcantara towards Siracusa
Location
- Location within Sicily Location within Italy

Taormina–Giardini railway station (Italian: Stazione di Taormina–Giardini or Taormina–Giardini, signed as Taormina–Giardini Naxos) is a historic railway station in the Italian municipality of Taormina in Sicily. It is owned by the Ferrovie dello Stato, the national rail company of Italy.

== History ==
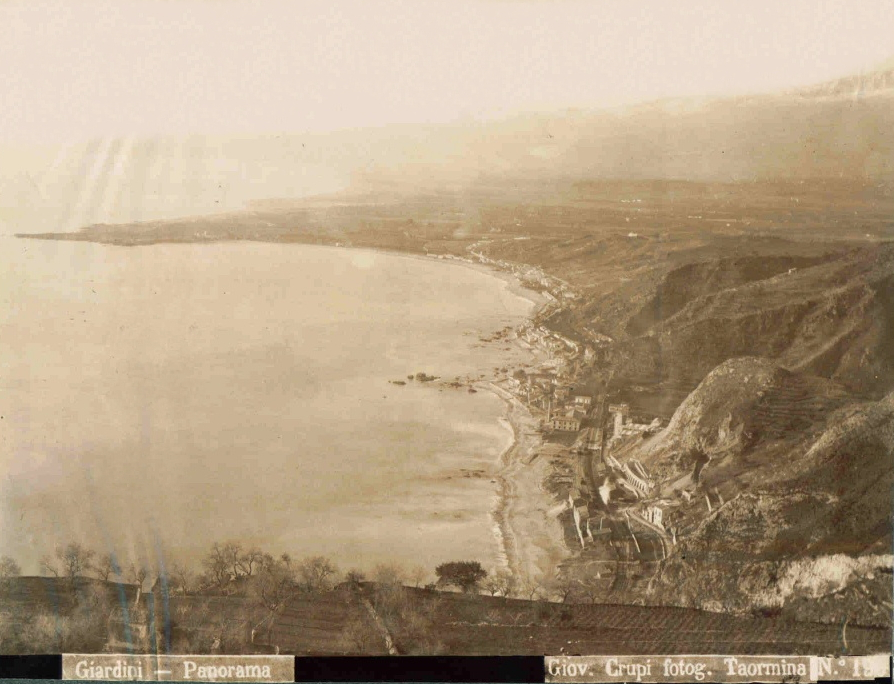
View of Giardini from a high vantage before 1925

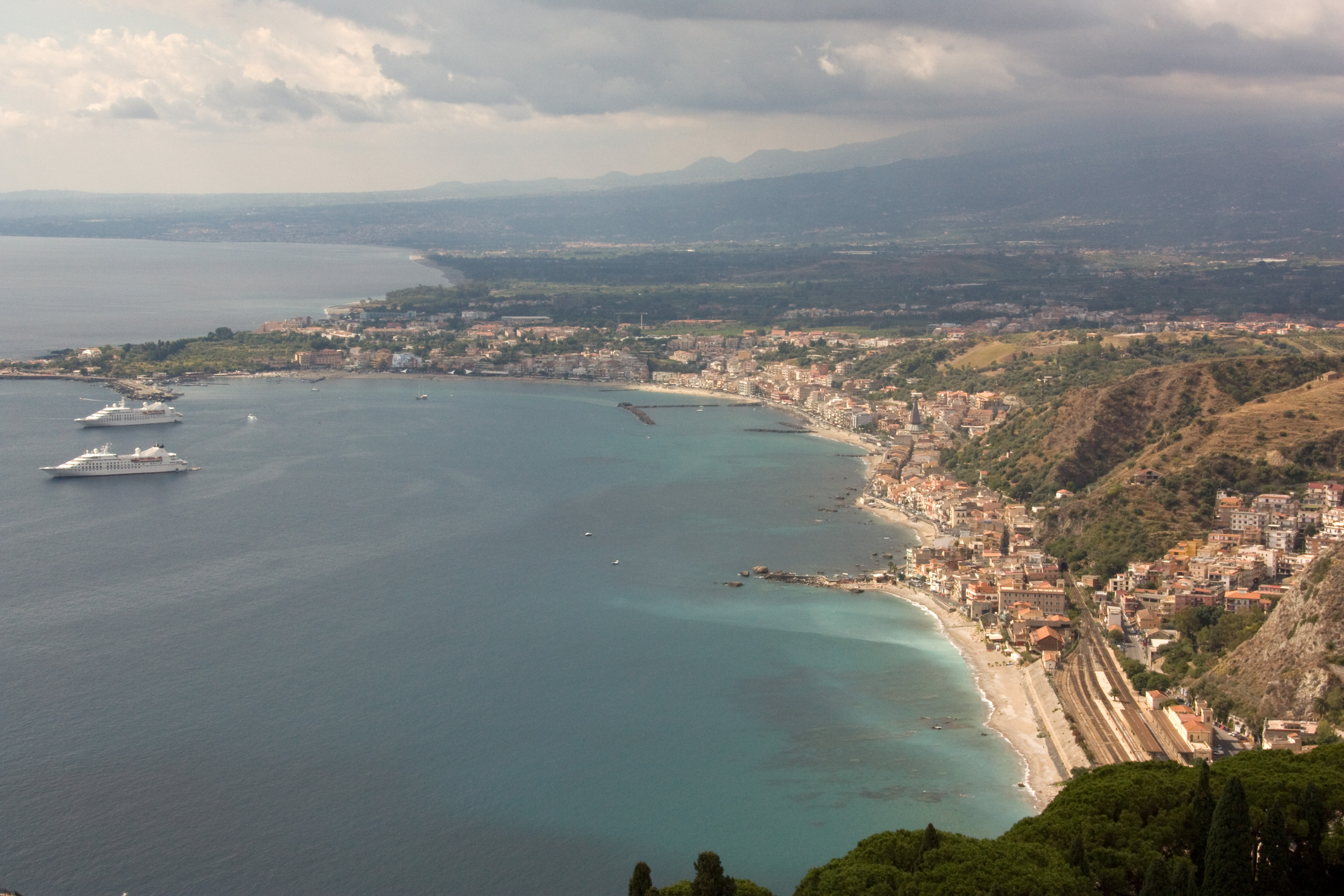
View of Giardini from Taormina Castle in September 2008

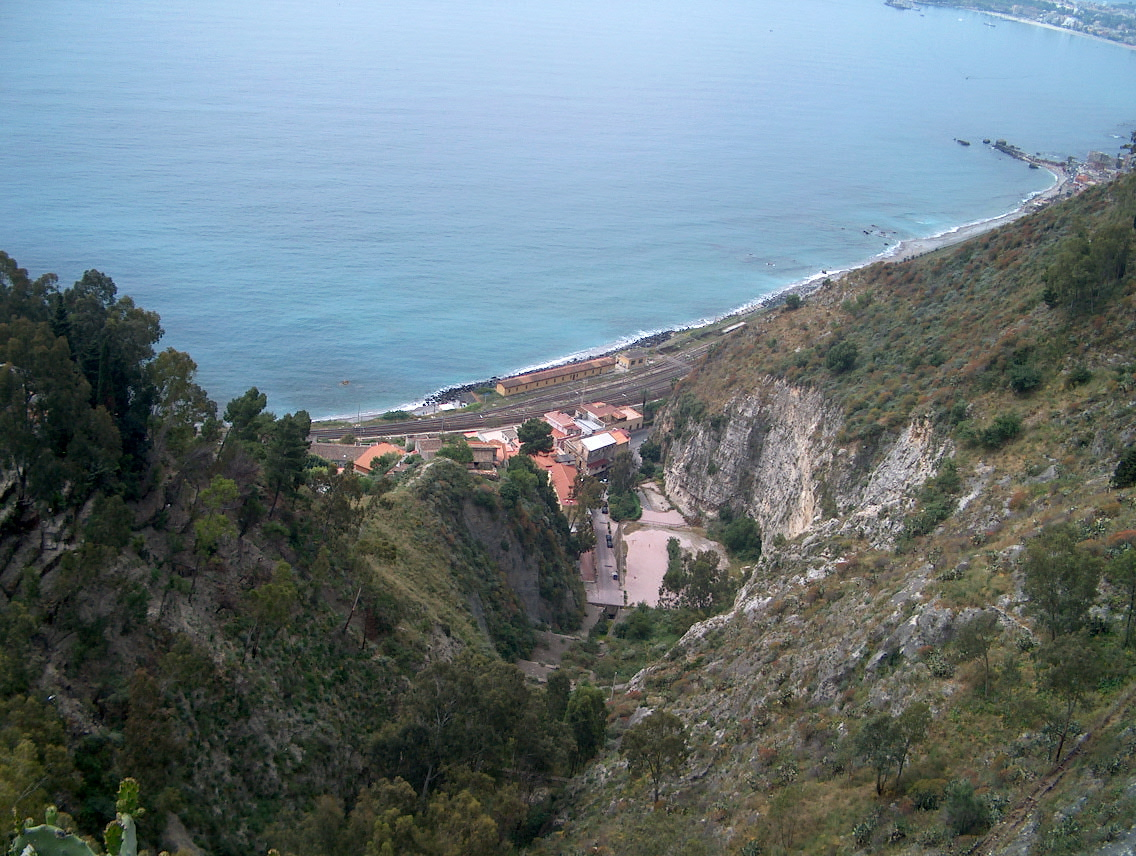
Aerial view of the station from Taormina

The station was designed as part of the railway construction program undertaken by the Victor Emmanuel Railway in Sicily, which planned to connect the extreme northern strip of Sicily and the port of Messina to the production areas of the east coast of the Ionian Sea via the railway. The station was built in the space between two galleries in the area below the town of Taormina, adjacent to State Road 114 (eastern Sicula), about one kilometer before the beginning of the town of Giardini, in the hamlet of Villagonia. The station initially took the name of the nearest municipality, Giardini.

Railway services were inaugurated on December 12, 1866, alongside the opening of the Messina to Giardini section of the Messina-Syracuse railway. The line was extended south towards Catania (Centrale) on January 3, 1867.

Due to financial difficulties encountered by the Victor Emmanuel Railway in the 1870s, the management of the plants were temporarily delegated to the Società per le strade ferrate della Sicilia (Society for the railways of Sicily) until 1885 when, following the division of the Italian railways into three large networks, the station was assumed by the Society as part of the Sicula network. In 1905 services were acquired by the Ferrovie dello Stato.

In the mid-1920s the state railways undertook a program to strengthen the railway infrastructure, as such the station was completely rebuilt. The task of preparing the project was delegated to architect Roberto Narducci. The expansion work of the station also provided for the expropriation of the Castello di Villagonia, home of the noble family of San Martino, princes of Pardo, dukes of Montalbano and Santo Stefano di Briga that stood on the seashore in the area partly used for the construction of the new railway station. Along with the castle, a chapel of the Madonna of Porto Salvo was also demolished. The current station building was constructed between 1926 and 1928.The station was then renamed to Taormina-Giardini.

During World War II, the station was bombed by the Allies.

From 1959 to 1994 the station was the origin of the trains to Randazzo via the Alcantara valley.

In 2014 the station was planned to be decommissioned and replaced with a "Taormina" stop in a different location on the double-track section. The intention by Ferrovie dello Stato to proceed with demolition of the station following a possible decommission caused controversy and backlash from local residents, as well as intervention from the Italian Superintendent of Cultural Heritage at the Ministry of Culture.

== Architecture ==
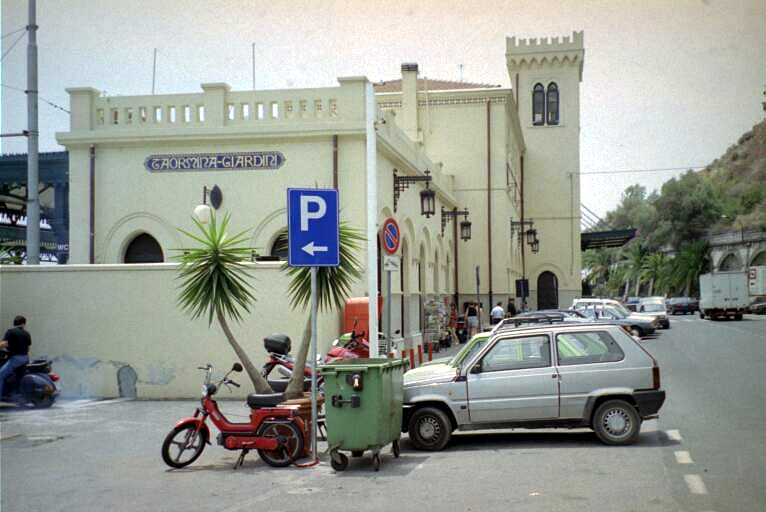
Station building in early 2007

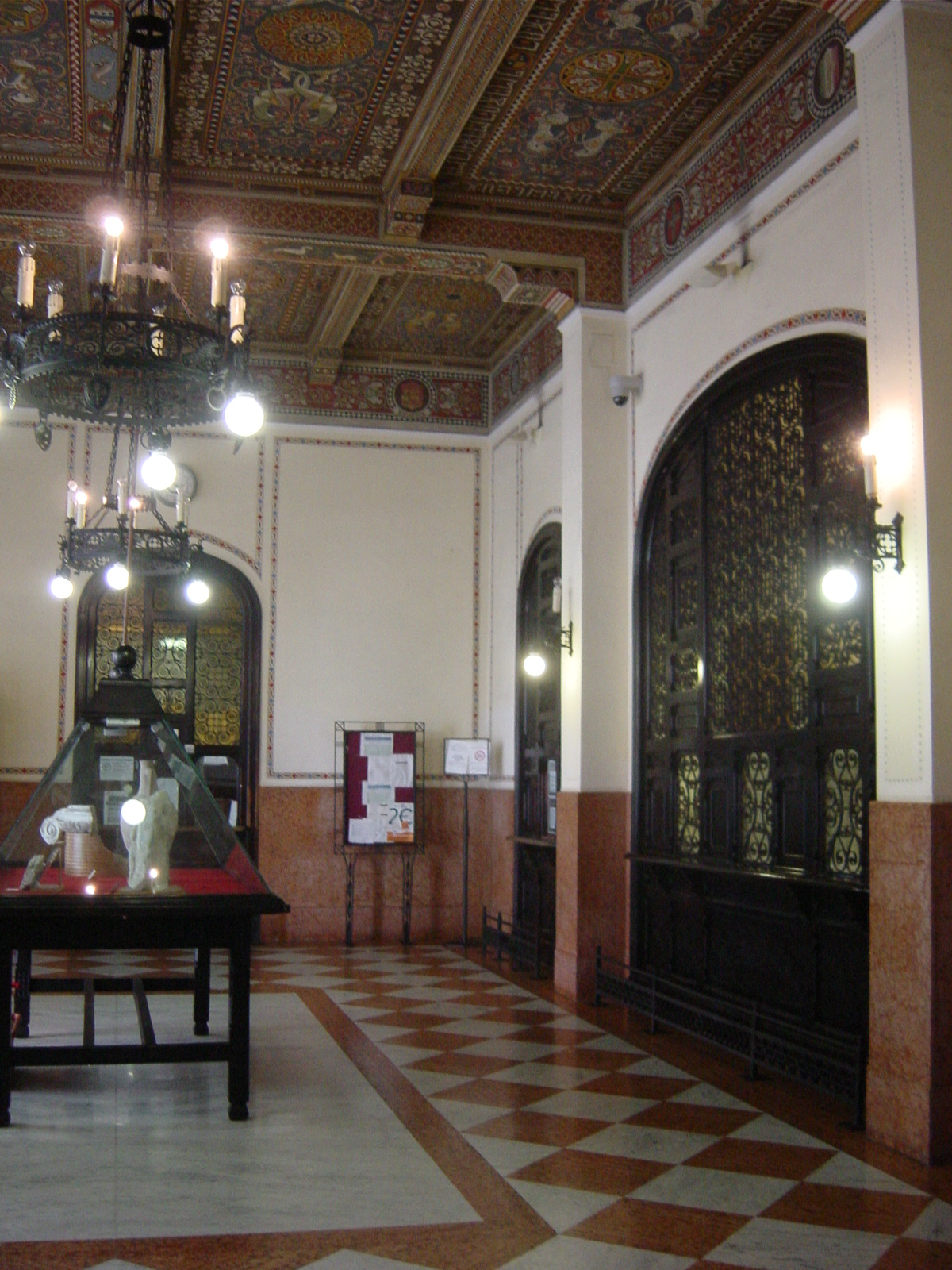
Train station lobby and ticket office, decorations

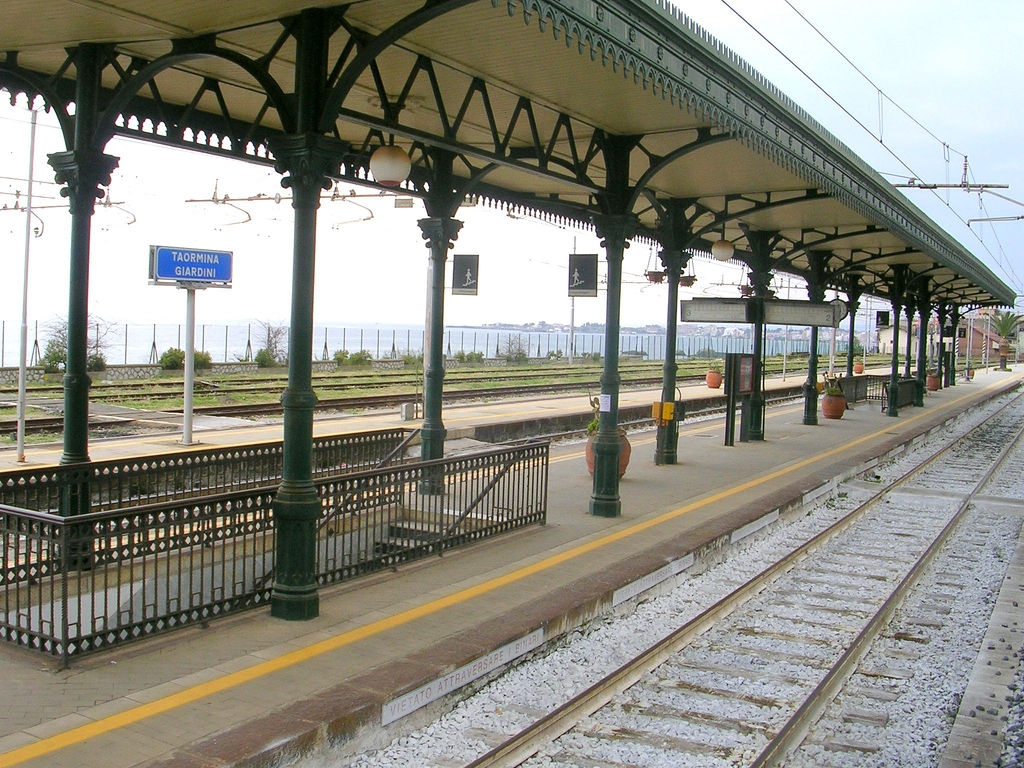
Detail of the shelters

The Taormina-Giardini station consists of a neo-Gothic station building with a two-story elevated central body, flanked by two elongated lateral bodies. The external facade is enriched in the central body by two crenellated towers arranged symmetrically with respect to the central body. The entrance is protected by an artistic wrought iron canopy. The drawing resumes by elaborating the architectural motifs of the demolished castle of Villagonia. The pointed arch and sixth windows take up motifs from the medieval past that can be traced back to Catalan Gothic architecture.

The internal rooms are furnished with dark wooden furniture in Sicilian style from the late nineteenth century. The walls and ceilings of the station's rooms are embellished with frescoes and relief decorations by Salvatore Gregorietti from Palermo, he also took care of the creation of stained glass windows and wrought iron furnishings.

The station is centered in the surrounding landscape located at the foot of the Taormina rock, on an embankment overlooking the evocative bay of Giardini Naxos.

== Structures ==
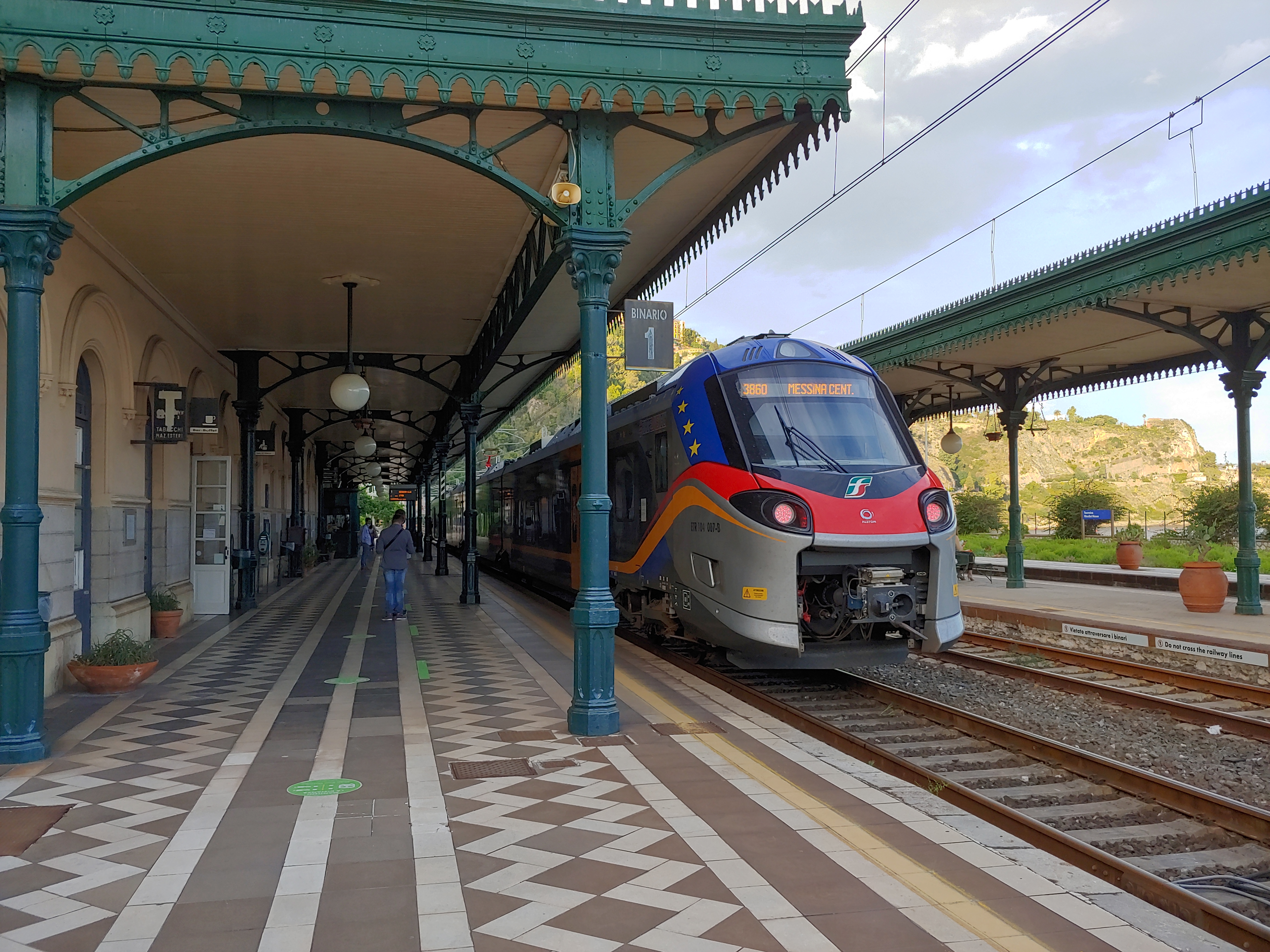
Regionale 3860 at the station in September 2020

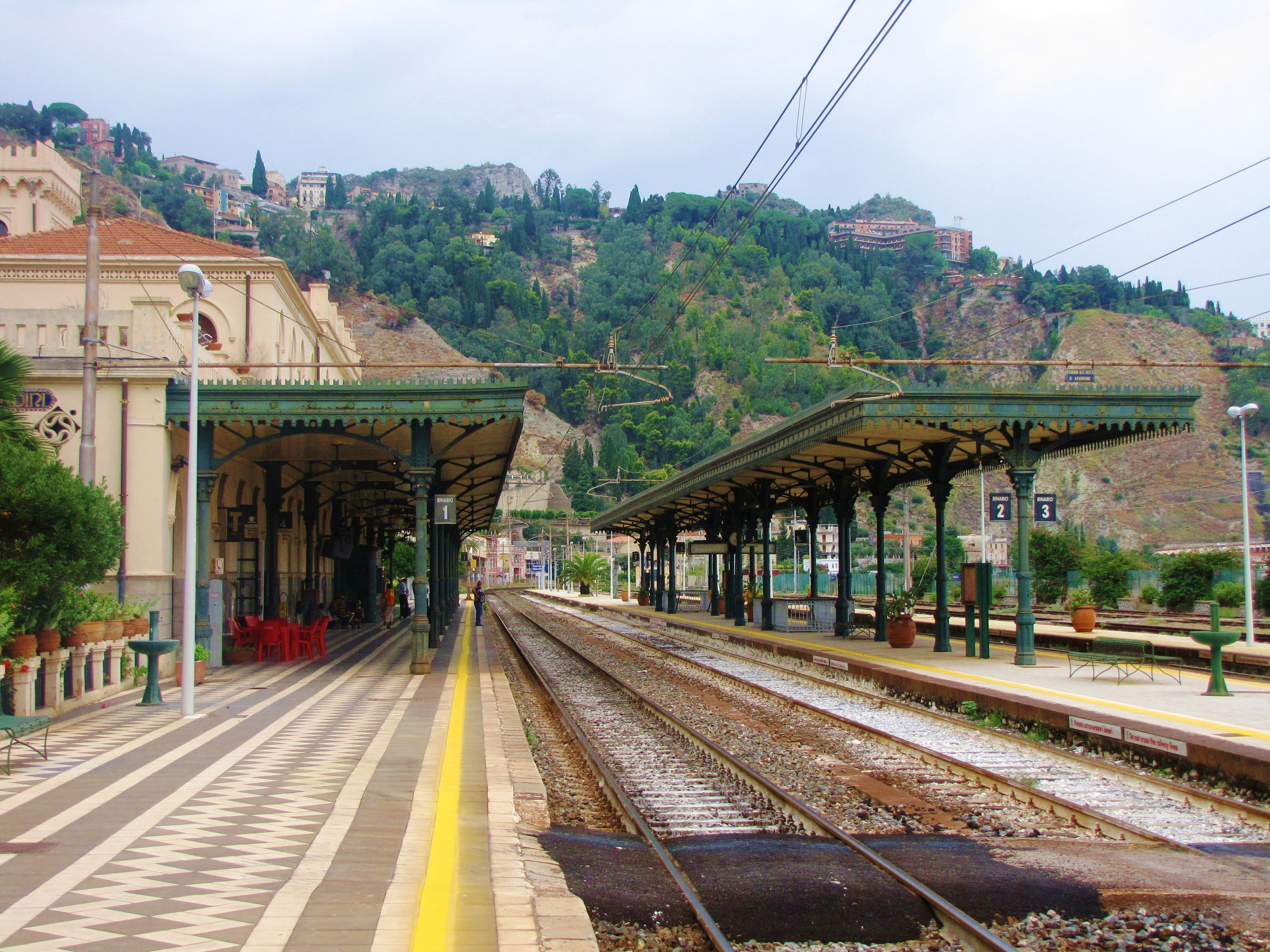
View of station and platforms in September 2009

The station is located almost halfway between Messina and Catania, on the single track section of the important railway connection in the region. The passenger building is placed in an almost symmetrical position with respect to the track beam on the upstream side with respect to it. Once upon a time two hydraulic columns for the supply of steam engines.

The track beam includes three tracks for passenger service; the sidewalks are connected by an underpass and equipped with cast iron shelters typical of the railway at the time of construction, with load-bearing iron columns.

There is also a set of tracks for loading and unloading located to the north of the building, equipped with a freight warehouse and a swing bridge; the square is partly used as passenger parking.

== Services ==
In 1938 the station was the main stop of nine accelerated trains coming from Messina, three direct trains with carriages from the mainland and three fast trains carried out with ALn 56 railcars, two of which continued to the Port of Syracuse. In the opposite direction, four accelerated trains from Catania and two from Syracuse stopped there, four direct trains, three of which continued towards the mainland and three rapid trains, one of which was original from Catania. Two accelerated trains and a fast train for Messina and an evening accelerated train for Syracuse originated in the Taormina-Giardini station; two accelerated trains, a mixed and a fast train from Messina ended there.

The official schedule of 1975 reported the stop of 10 trains in local service, 10 express (of which 3 were periodic) and 2 direct from the mainland or coinciding but originating in Messina and a fast train from Rome Termini. In the opposite sense, seven trains made local stops, one direct and seven express trains (of these 3 were periodic). They originated at Taormina-Giardini, four local trains for Messina and two for Catania.

The movement of goods was supported at the beginning of the twentieth century also by the presence of a hydraulic lime production plant in the immediate vicinity But it decayed inexorably starting from the seventies. The decision to abolish wagon and collective services implemented by the FS finally led to its suppression.

In 2014, the regional passenger trains operated by Trenitalia stopped as part of the service contract provided for the Sicilian Region: the service offered the stop of 20 regional trains coming from Messina and in continuation, and two trains to Catania originated there. In the opposite direction, there were 20 regional trains that stopped there. There were also two pairs of InterCity trains and three pairs of InterCity Notte trains arriving from the continent and continuing to Catania and Syracuse and vice versa.

In 2025 ""In treno"" Digital regional timetable, in force from 15 June to 13 December 2025, timetable 97, pp. 124-158 it is noted that Trenitalia offers the stopping service for Regional and Regional Fast trains coming from Messina and Regional and Regional Fast trains coming from Catania and Siracusa. InterCity pairs and InterCity Notte pairs arriving from Milano Centrale, Roma Termini and continuing to Catania and Syracuse and vice versa also stop there.

== In popular culture ==
The station has been filmed many times, most notably in The Godfather Part III (1990) as a stand-in for Bagheria railway station.

The station has also been filmed in various Italian films, such as The Little Devil (1988), The Big Blue (1988), and Made in Italy (1965).

== Bibliography ==
- Ferrovie dello Stato, Palermo (24 September 1995). Circulation file for the lines of the peripheral unit. pp. 129–139.
- Emilio Ganzerla (September 2013). "Taormina-Giardini". Mondo Ferroviario (313): 22–35.
- Ezio Godoli e Antonietta Iolanda Lima (2004). Architettura ferroviaria in Italia, Novecento, Dalla nazionalizzazione agli anni trenta ampliamenti e nuove realizzazioni in Sicilia. Palermo: Dario Flaccovio Editore. pp. 139–168.
- Giuseppe Mercurio (2008). Giardini Naxos... le cartoline raccontano. Messina: Ed. Sfamemi.
- Ninni Panzera, ed. (2012). Il cinema sopra Taormina. Cento anni di luoghi, storie e personaggi dei film girati a Taormina. Messina: Edizioni La Zattera dell'Arte.

== Related entries ==
- Messina–Syracuse railway
- Railway network of Sicily
- Victor Emmanuel Railway
- Società per le strade ferrate della Sicilia (Society for the Railways of Sicily)
