= Francesco Grimaldi =

Francesco Grimaldi may refer to:

- Francesco Maria Grimaldi (1618–1663), an Italian Jesuit priest, mathematician and physicist;
- François Grimaldi (died 1309), called il Malizia ("the Cunning"), first ruler of Monaco and son of the Guelf Guglielmo Grimaldi;
- Francesco Grimaldi (architect) (1543–1613), a Theatine priest and architect;
- Francesco Ceva Grimaldi (historian) (1806–1864), an Italian historian, writer, and administrator;
- Francesco Ceva Grimaldi (politician) (1831–1899), an Italian politician.
