= FS Class 410 =

Class of 25 Italian 0-8-0 locomotives

FS Class 410 RS 301-325
Type and origin
- Power type: Steam
- Builder: Breda, Ansaldo, Officine Meccaniche
- Build date: 1892-1903
- Total produced: 25
Specifications
- Configuration
  - Whyte: 0-8-0
- Gauge: 1,435 mm (4 ft 8 1/2 in)
- Driver dia.: 1.2 m (47 in)
- Length: 16.283 m (53.42 ft)
- Loco weight: 50.4 tonnes (49.6 long tons; 55.6 short tons)
- Fuel type: Coal
- Fuel capacity: 2,500 kg (5,500 lb)
- Water cap.: 9,500 kg (20,900 lb)
- Boiler pressure: 8 bar (0.80 MPa; 120 psi)
- Cylinders: 2 outside
- Valve gear: Walschaerts
Performance figures
- Maximum speed: 45 km/h (28 mph)
- Power output: 600 hp (450 kW)
- Tractive effort: 10,300 kgf (23,000 lbf)

FS Class 410 were 0-8-0 steam locomotives which the Italian State Railways (FS) acquired from Rete Sicula (the Sicilian Network) on nationalization in 1906.

== History ==
The class was designed by the Sicula Network Research Office led by engineer Guglielmo Cappa as part of a renewal and unification programme to replace obsolete rolling stock inherited from the previous management. It was designated as a group F, according to the custom that was then to define with letters the group of locomotives according to their function, and numbered from 301 to 325. When they passed to FS, they were registered as Class 420. They had some technical differences from other FS 0-8-0 locomotives, notably the use of Walschaerts valve gear instead of Stephenson.

They were built in three batches and there were some detail differences between batches. The first unit was ordered from Breda in Milan and delivered in 1892 and a further 21 units came from Ansaldo's Sampierdarena factory between 1893 and 1894. Finally in 1903 another batch of 3 locomotives was built and delivered by Officine Meccaniche of Milan. In 1906 the transfer to FS occurred, and the locomotives received the new four-digit markings 4101-4125 which later became 410.001-025. The locomotives spent their working lives on the island of Sicily.

== Features ==
The Class 410 locomotives, with a power output of 600 hp (450 kW), were versatile machines and designed for every type of use, although the small wheels (diameter 1,200 mm or 47 in) limited the speed to 45 km/h (28 mph). They were built for saturated steam and simple expansion with 2 outside cylinders. Steam distribution was by slide valves with Walschaerts valve gear.
