= Cappa (surname) =

Cappa is an Italian surname. Notable people with the surname include:

- Adam Cappa (born 1985), American musician
- Andrea Cappa (born 1993), Italian football player
- Ángel Cappa (born 1946), Argentine football manager and former player
- Alex Cappa (born 1995), American football player
- Benedetta Cappa (1897–1977), Italian artist
- Goffredo Cappa (1644–1717), Italian luthier
- Guglielmo Cappa (1844–1905), Italian engineer
- Paolo Cappa (1888–1956), Italian journalist, lawyer and politician
- Catherine Scorsese, née Cappa (1912–1997), Italian-American actress
