= FS Class 910 =

FS Class 910 RS Class 400
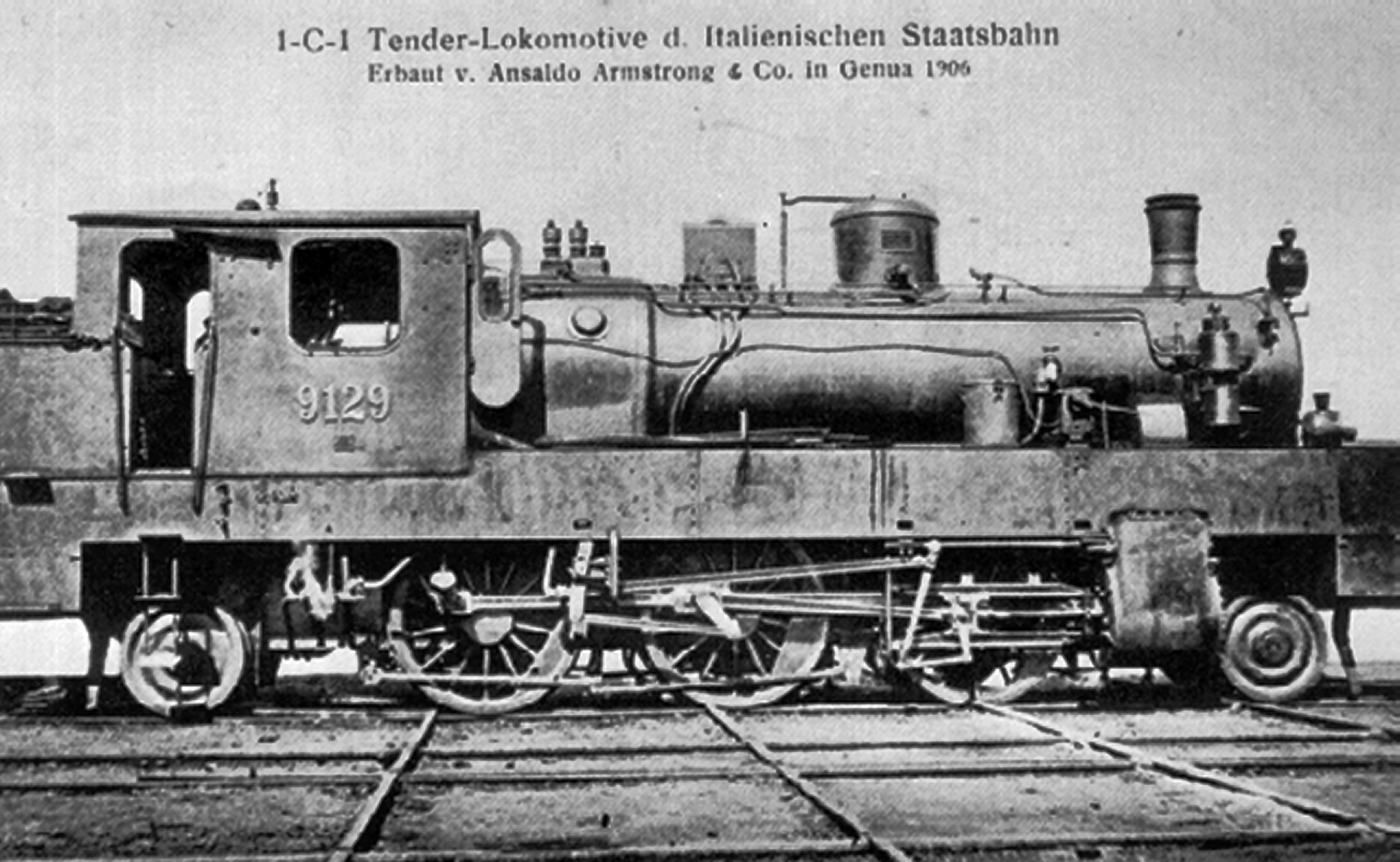
- FS Class 910
Type and origin
- Power type: Steam
- Builder: Gio. Ansaldo & C. (19); Società Italiana Ernesto Breda (35)
- Build date: 1905–1908
- Total produced: 54
Specifications
- Configuration
  - Whyte: 2-6-2T
  - UIC: 1′C1′ n2vt
- Gauge: 1,435 mm (4 ft 8 1/2 in)
- Leading dia.: 850 mm (2 ft 9 1/2 in)
- Driver dia.: 1,510 mm (4 ft 11 1/2 in)
- Wheelbase
  - Axle spacing (Asymmetrical): 2,400 mm (7 ft 10 1/2 in); 1,900 mm (6 ft 2 3/4 in); 1,900 mm (6 ft 2 3/4 in); 2,300 mm (7 ft 6 1/2 in)
  - Engine: 8,500 mm (27 ft 10 5/8 in)
- Length
  - Over headstocks: 11,552 mm (37 ft 10 3/4 in)
  - Over buffers: 12,752 mm (41 ft 10 in)
- Height: 4,210 mm (13 ft 9 3/4 in)
- Axle load
  - Leading: 11,700 kg (11.5 long tons; 12.9 short tons)
  - Coupled: 14,500 kg (14.3 long tons; 16.0 short tons)
  - Trailing: 11,700 kg (11.5 long tons; 12.9 short tons)
- Adhesive weight: 43,500 kg (42.8 long tons; 48.0 short tons)
- Loco weight: 63,400 kg (62.4 long tons; 69.9 short tons); 66,900 kg (65.8 long tons; 73.7 short tons) after modification
- Fuel type: Coal
- Boiler
  - Pitch: 2,710 mm (8 ft 10 3/4 in)
- Boiler pressure: 13 kgf/cm^{2} (12.7 bar; 185 psi)
- Cylinders: 1 high pressure 1 low pressure
- High-pressure cylinder: 460 mm × 600 mm (18 1/8 in × 23 5/8 in)
- Low-pressure cylinder: 700 mm × 600 mm (27 9/16 in × 23 5/8 in)
- Valve gear: Walschaerts
Performance figures
- Maximum speed: 75 km/h (47 mph)
- Power output: 690 CV (510 kW; 680 hp)
Career
- Operators: Rete Sicula; Italian State Railways; Yugoslav Railways
- Numbers: RS: 401–406; FS 9101–9154; FS 910.001–910.054; JŽ 115.001–115.007
- Retired: 1950s

FS Class 910 were 2-6-2 tank locomotives designed by Guglielmo Cappa for Rete Sicula where they were registered as RS Class 400. They were absorbed by Italian State Railways (FS) in 1905 and became FS Class 910.

== History ==
With the conventions of 1885, Rete Sicula took over the lines of Società per le Strade Ferrate Calabro-Sicule and had to face the problems of constructing new lines and introducing modern locomotives. The engineer Guglielmo Cappa designed the Class 400 steam locomotives which were re-registered as FS Class 910 on nationalization in 1905. The locomotive was designed to tackle steeply-graded lines, such as Messina - Palermo with its pass of the Peloritani Mountains and its long tunnel. It also had to be suitable for minor local or commuter services and to have the characteristic of bidirectionality, to gain time at terminal stations by avoiding the need for turntables.

The choice was a 2-6-2T which allowed the same speed in both directions of travel. The first 19 locomotives were built by Ansaldo of Sampierdarena, while the remaining 35 were built by Società Italiana Ernesto Breda of Milan. Deliveries took place during the passage of the Sicula Network to the FS. The first delivery was of 6 locomotives registered by the Sicula network as RS 401-406. Later deliveries were numbered in the FS 91xx series from the start. In 1906 a specimen was exhibited at the Milan Exposition. The entire group became concentrated in Milan for suburban services and those in Sicily were transferred to Milan. Over the years, they underwent small changes and continued to perform good service in the locomotive depots of Milano Centrale and Pavia for the service on the lines from Milan to Bergamo, Como, Lecco and Voghera.

=== Diesel conversion ===
In 1929 the 910.042 was experimentally converted to a Diesel-Zarlatti locomotive. This had a diesel engine and compressed-air transmission, using the original steam cylinders. It was not a great success and had no practical follow-up.

=== World War II ===
During World War II, some locomotives were used for operations in Yugoslavia and seven of them remained there permanently at the end of the war, incorporated by the Yugoslavian Railways (JŽ) as their class 115.

== Technical features ==
The locomotives used saturated steam and compound expansion. The high-pressure cylinder was on the left, with piston valves, and the low-pressure cylinder was on the right, with a slide valve. Outside Walschaerts valve gear was used.

The locomotive frame was carried on three coupled axles and two one-axle trucks, of the Adams type, at the two ends. This made the locomotive stable, even at high speeds, both in forward and reverse. The boiler had 222 fire tubes, increased to 226 in the second ordering series. Despite being a tank engine, the locomotive carried 3,000 kg (6,600 lb) of coal and 8,000 kg (18,000 lb) of water.

A modification carried out from the second series onwards was the increase in the diameter of the carrying wheels from 830 to 960 mm (33 to 38 in) and the replacement of the Nathan lubrication system with a Friedmann lubrication pump. The locomotive was equipped with a compressed air brake and a proportional brake. It was also equipped for steam heating of the train.

== Depot allocations ==
- Messina
- Milano
- Padova
- Milano Greco
- Venezia Mestre
- Livorno
- Voghera
- Brescia
- Lecco

== Preservation ==
Number 910.001 was restored and is at the National Railway Museum of Pietrarsa.
