= William Joseph Still =

British mechanical engineer and inventor

William Joseph Still

William Joseph Still was an English engineer. He was born at Reigate on 17 August 1870. In 1884, he went to Canada to work for a firm of electric vehicle manufacturers. In 1894, he returned to England, where he invented a double-acting diesel-steam engine in which waste heat from the cylinder jacket and the exhaust was used to produce steam to assist the diesel engine. This is covered by U.S. patent 1230617 of 1917. Still also invented the Still heat-transmitting tube which was used in refrigeration plant.

== The Still engine ==
The Still engine was used experimentally for stationary, marine and locomotive applications. The best-known application was the Kitson-Still locomotive of 1926 which was tried out on the London and North Eastern Railway

The Still engine gave an increase in thermal efficiency over an ordinary diesel engine but was not a long-term success because of the added complexity of the steam system.

== Patents ==
Still obtained a large number of British, Canadian and U.S. patents. Some examples follow:

- GB191317862, Improvements in means for injecting fuel into the cylinders of internal-combustion engines
- CA49886, Rectifier for electrical currents
- US547043, Rectifier for electrical currents
- US1171899, Manufacture of gilled tubular apparatus

In February 1920 Still (with his engineering collaborator Francis Acland) sold his steam-diesel engine patents to the Still Engine Company Limited, a company floated on the London Stock Exchange to exploit his invention, for £10,000 (equivalent to £560,000 in 2023). The prospectus claimed that shipbuilders Dennys of Glasgow, Armstrong Whitworth of Newcastle, ACL of Nantes and Scotts of Greenock (with others under negotiation, including Nobel frères of Sweden) had taken licences to produce marine versions of Still's engine; of these only Scotts is known to have placed it into production.
