= Diesel-Zarlatti locomotive =

The Diesel-Zarlatti locomotive was a prototype railway locomotive, built in Italy in 1929, which adopted a hybrid diesel-steam transmission system.

== History ==
In the 1920s, there was a search for alternatives to the steam locomotive for railway traction, to reduce cost and improve efficiency. The main alternatives were railway electrification or the use of an internal combustion engine, such as the diesel engine.

A disadvantage of the internal combustion engine was the need for a transmission system. One option to be explored was the conversion of an existing steam locomotive by fitting a diesel engine and an air compressor to supply compressed air to the existing steam cylinders. This was the constructive principle on which the Zarlatti locomotive was based. It may be seen as a development of the earlier Mekarski system.

Between 1928 and 1929 FS steam locomotive number 910.042 was modified at the Royal Arsenal of La Spezia to test the system, which was based on the patents of the inventors Fausto Zarlatti and Umberto Simoni. If the system had been a success, it could have led to the modification of a large number of FS steam locomotives and the avoidance of the need to build new locomotives.

The tests took place on the Rome–Lido railway from 6 April to 25 April 1929 with 16 round-trip pairs. The maximum speed was 74 km/h (46 mph) with a tail load of 101 t (99 long tons; 111 short tons). The experiment had some success but there were problems: On 17 April, the piston of the engine water circulation pump broke and on 23 April a pipe attached to the Westinghouse brake compressor became detached. The experiment, for these reasons, was not pursued.

== Technical features ==
The boiler and superstructure were removed from the locomotive in the arsenal workshop at La Spezia but the original compound expansion steam cylinders were left in place. A six-cylinder, two-stroke diesel engine built by Fiat-San Giorgio was installed. This engine produced 325 hp (242 kW) at 450 rpm and drove a rotary compressor, built by a Swiss company in Winterthur, which delivered compressed air at 8 bar (800 kPa; 120 psi) pressure. A small naphtha-fired boiler with a heating surface of 52 m^{2} (560 ft^{2}) was also installed for the production of steam. Cooling water from the engine and compressor was fed into the boiler at about 70 °C (158 °F). For cold starting, the boiler was used to preheat the diesel engine. When the locomotive started from rest, the original steam cylinders were fed with steam alone, but when running they were powered by a mixture of steam and compressed air. The steam was needed to prevent the cylinders icing up, because compressed air cools when it expands.

== See also ==
- Steam diesel hybrid locomotive
