= Francesco Ceva Grimaldi (politician) =

Italian politician (1831–1899)

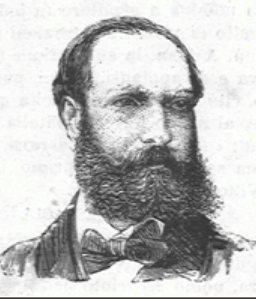
- Born: Francesco Maria Giuseppe Raffaele Ceva Grimaldi; 13 February 1831; Naples, Italy
- Died: 21 November 1899 (aged 68); Rome, Italy
- Occupation: Politician
- Relatives: Francesco Ceva Grimaldi (cousin)

Francesco Ceva Grimaldi (13 February 1831 – 21 November 1899) was an Italian politician. He was a Senator of the Kingdom of Italy and a Commander of the Order of the Crown of Italy.

== Life and career ==
A member of a noble family of Genoese origin that established itself in Naples in the 16th century, Ceva Grimaldi was born in Naples, the only son of Maria Adelaide Martini and Giuseppe Ceva Grimaldi who had been the President of the Council of Ministers of the Kingdom of Two Sicilies. As a young man, he had belonged to an early precursor of the Italian Liberal Party but left the party because of police harassment following the failure of the 1848 revolutions. He nevertheless adhered to liberal ideals throughout his life, according to his eulogy in the Italian Senate delivered by Giuseppe Saracco.

Ceva Grimaldi inherited the title of Marchese di Pietracatella in 1862 on the death of his father. He was appointed a Senator of the Kingdom of Italy in 1876 and was made a Commander of the Order of the Crown of Italy, the following year. During his time as a senator he was also on the administrative boards of the Real Casa Santa dell'Annunziata orphanage and the Società della Ferrovia Sicula Occidentale.

Ceva Grimaldi was married to Costanza Statella, also from a noble Neapolitan family. They had no children, and on his death in Rome in 1899 the title of Marchese di Pietracatella passed to Marcello, the son of his cousin Francesco Ceva Grimaldi (1806–1864). This older Francesco Ceva Grimaldi was a writer and historian whose books included Memorie storiche della città di Napoli.

== See also ==
- Ceva Grimaldi family
