= Louis Mékarski =

French engineer

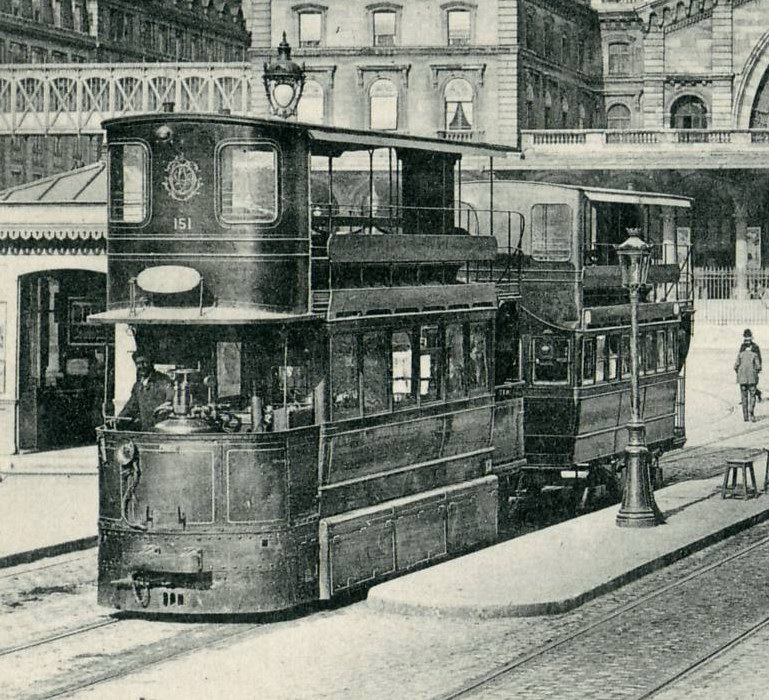
Mékarski tram in Paris in 1900

Louis Mékarski (in Polish Ludwik Mękarski) (1843, Clermont-Ferrand, France – 1923) was a French engineer and inventor of Polish origin. In the 1870s he invented the so-called Mekarski system of compressed-air powered trams which was used in several cities of France and USA as alternative to horse-powered and steam-powered trams.

== Patents ==
Louis Mékarski (with Paul Lucas-Girardville, an early aviator) patented a similar system for automobiles in 1903. Waste heat from an internal combustion engine generated steam, which was mixed with compressed air from an air compressor driven by the ic engine. The air/steam mixture then drove a separate piston engine which propelled the vehicle. This system pre-dated the better-known Still engine.

Mékarski also obtained a patent for spring wheels for vehicles.

== Commemoration ==
In Nantes there is a street Rue Louis Mékarski.
