= Società per le strade ferrate della Sicilia =

Sicilian train line construction and operating company

The Società per le strade ferrate della Sicilia, better known as Rete Sicula (Sicilian Network) was a company for the construction and operation of the railway lines of Sicily.

== History ==
The company was formed, mainly with foreign capital, by a banking group with headquarters in Rome, following the agreements of 1885 that divided the Italian railway network into three large corporate groups. It replaced the previous companies that ran the island railway lines, among which was the Vittorio Emanuele Company which, had entered a serious phase of financial difficulties that led to bankruptcy. At the time of the takeover, the planned construction programme had not yet been completed. At 1 May 1876, the length of the Sicilian railway network was 550 kilometres. The Palermo - Marsala - Trapani line came into operation on 5 June 1881 by the Società della Ferrovia Sicula Occidentale. In 1885 the entire Sicilian network extended for a total of 597 km. The newly established company continued its construction programme slowly. In 1895, the Palermo - Messina railway was finally completed and, at the end of 1896, the network of Sicilian railways had reached 1,093 km. From 1901 to 1905 the engineer Riccardo Bianchi was the general director of the company

== Ferries ==
In November 1893, the company was given the concession for navigation by steam through the Strait of Messina, with the obligation to make two daily ferry trips between Messina and Reggio Calabria. Two daily ferry trips to Villa San Giovanni were established at the time of completion of the Southern Tyrrhenian Railway. In 1894 the company ordered a pair of ferry-boats, with paddle drive and steam engines, which entered service at the end of 1896 as train ferries. The two ferry-ships were the Scilla and the Cariddi. The regular ferry service of freight wagons between Messina and Reggio Calabria began in November 1899 and, on 1 August 1901, the company inaugurated the passenger ferry with two coaches of the Rome-Syracuse direct train.
