= William Peter Durtnall =

British electrical engineer

- Born: 1873; Herne Bay
- Died: 1947 (aged 73–74); Luton
- Citizenship: British
- Occupations: Electrical engineer, captain at the Royal Air Force
- Organization: Royal Air Force

William Peter Durtnall (1873–1947), M.I.Mar.E., M.I.Auto.E., M.I.Loco.E, was a British electrical engineer and inventor, and a captain in the Royal Air Force. He was involved in both marine and locomotive engineering and invented a thermoelectric engine patented as the "Paragon". He transferred from the Royal Navy Volunteer Reserve to a temporary commission as a captain in the Royal Air Force in April 1918.

== Early life ==
Durtnall was born in Herne Bay, Kent 1873 and baptised there on 2 February 1873. His father was a mariner before marriage, and later became a railway carman. His mother ran a lodging house, and his grandfather had been a sailmaker at Chatham Dockyard.

== Career ==
Durtnall was apprenticed to Willans at Rugby, where he was involved in a junior position in work relating to the Heilmann steam locomotives. He first served at the Herne Bay Electric Light Co. in 1886. He then served at the Maxim Weston Electric Company's works at Dalston under Mr W J L Hamilton, Engineer for both companies, until 1890. He was elected an Associate of the Institution of Electrical Engineers in 1893.

The Herne Bay Electric Light Co. appears never to have been formally registered. It was promoted by a firm called Shippy Bros, backed by the Universal Electric Light Co. and Durtnall (along with other employees) was not paid his wages between March 1888 and January 1889, resulting in a court case at Canterbury County Court on 2 April 1889. Durtnall was employed by the Herne Bay Co. from May 1887 to 26 January 1889 and was paid a wage of 6s. per week to clean and stoke the engine, fit up bells and attend to the offices. Judgement was given in £9 for 30 weeks wages.

In October 1890 he was appointed Chief Electrical Engineer to the Cannon Street Hotel Co. he installed a high frequency electrical system at Cannon Street Hotel in 1895. He resigned in 1899; by 1901 he had set up in business as an Electric Light and Power Engineer from premises at 85 Finsbury Pavement, E.C. Notable installations included: Messrs Hurst & Co. Dye Works; The Guildhall Literary & Art School, Winchester Corporation; Anderton's Hotel, Fleet Street, London; Messrs Raphael Tuck & Sons, Moorfields City, London; Messrs A V Smeeton & Co., Sun Court, Golden Lane, City (Arthur Valentine Smeeton, costume & blouse manufacturer, bankrupt 1908).

Some of his subsequent work was on buses and ships. He made an experimental petrol electric bus for London use c1905. However, was most of his work was with ships. Back in England, he continued work on 'hybrid' drives, namely coupling a high speed internal combustion engine to generators or alternators that produced electricity for variable speed electric traction motors that drove ship's propellers or wheels on automobiles and locomotives.

The "Paragon" thermo-electric engine was developed and patented by Durtnall in the early years of the 20th century. He proposed a number of applications, including road, rail, marine and air transport. In 1906, Durtnall designed and constructed the first vehicle to be propelled by polyphase alternating current, generated on the vehicle itself. It took the form of a motor-omnibus that could travel at three different speeds. By 1921, he was working for R. & W. Hawthorn, Leslie and Company.

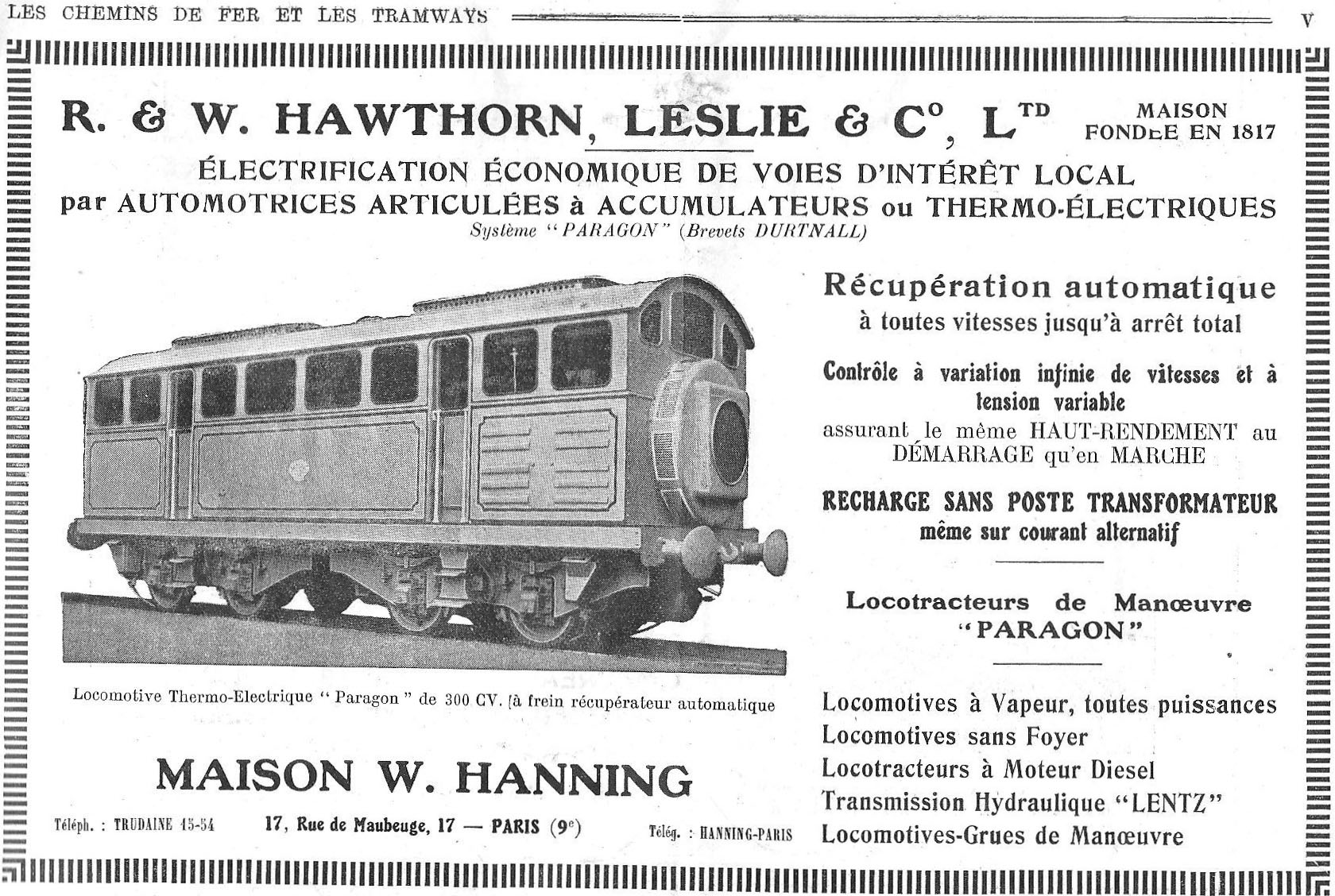
One of Durtnall's "Paragon" electric battery locomotives in an advertisement

Durtnall's propulsion system was first made public at the Franco-British Exposition in July 1908, where he read an original paper on the subject before members of the Institute of Marine Engineers. He there was awarded the Denny gold medal. In 1917 he was awarded the president's gold medal.

== World War I ==
In the Great War, he served in the Royal Naval Volunteer Reserve, transferring to the RAF when formed. He was made temporary Lt. (R.N.V.R.), 7 August 1917 and Staff Officer; Lt., (R.N.V.R)., and given a temporary commission as captain, 16 April 1918. He was appointed captain on 1 February 1920. He always styled himself Captain RAF, but captain is not an RAF rank. He was in the Air Ministry, which gave its staff Army ranks. His post was in the electrical section of the Civil Engineer's department.

== Later life and death ==
Durtnall was active in engineering affairs from 1919, writing some articles, attending conferences, and making comments on proceedings until c1925, after which he appears to have written little. He spent his later years in Luton, where he died in 1947.

== Design work ==
=== Locomotives ===
Durtnall read a paper entitled "The Evolution and Development of the Internal Combustion Railway Locomotive" to the Institution of Locomotive Engineers at Caxton Hall, Victoria, London on 17 June 1914. In 1923, in association with Hawthorn Leslie and Company, he built a petrol/steam hybrid locomotive using the Cristiani compressed steam system. He also designed a petrol engined electric transmission locomotive for service in Australia (unbuilt) and a Battery electric locomotive. His thermo-electric locomotive, first proposed in 1902, was not built until 1920.

=== Marine ===
Durtnall devised an electric transmission system for ships. On 18 July 1908 he read a paper on "The generation and electrical transmission of power for main marine propulsion and speed regulation" to the Institute of Marine Engineers at their meeting at the Congress Hall of the Franco-British Exhibition. In 1909, Durtnall claimed that the use of the Paragon system in a Dreadnought would save 26% in the cost of fuel.

=== Aviation ===
In 1919 The Times reported that Durtnall, together with Commander G.T. Bowles R.N., had completed tests at Manchester on a new type of aeroplane engine that would be silent and from which the danger of fire in the air had been removed.

== Sources ==
- Brian Webb (1974), The British Internal Combustion Locomotive 1890–1940, David & Charles, Newton Abbot
- Henry Metcalf Hobart (1911), "XV. The Durtnall System of Propelling Ships", The electric propulsion of ships, Harper & Brothers, London and New York, pp. 135–157
