= Giarre–Riposto railway station =

Railway station in Giarre, Italy

Giarre–Riposto
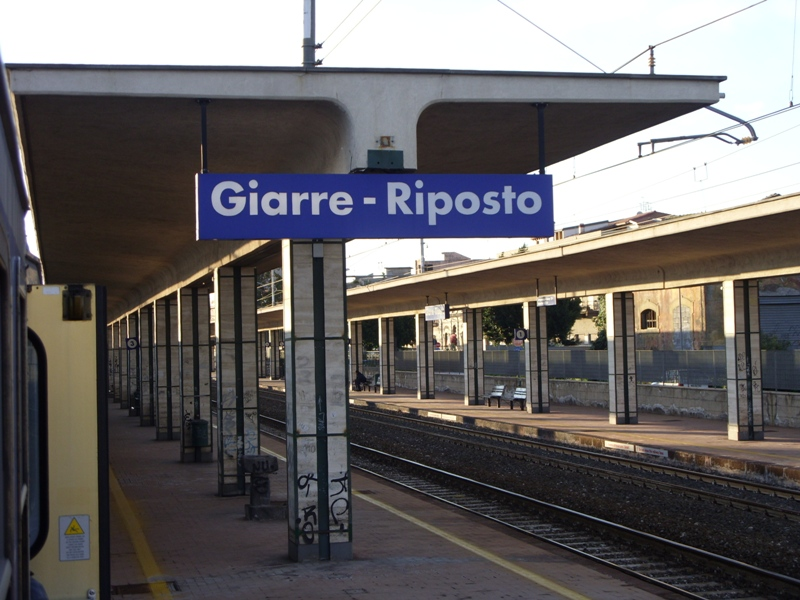

General information
- Location: Giarre, Metropolitan City of Catania, Sicily; Italy
- Coordinates: 37°43′48.72″N 15°11′36.96″E
- Owner: Rete Ferroviaria Italiana
- Operator: Trenitalia
- Line: Messina–Syracuse railway

History
- Opened: January 3, 1867
- Former names: Ionia

Services
Preceding station	Trenitalia	Following station
Taormina–Giardini towards Milano Centrale	InterCity Notte; Milan–Syracuse	Acireale towards Siracusa
Location
- Location within Sicily Location within Italy

Giarre–Riposto is a railway station owned by Rete Ferroviaria Italiana located in the municipality of Giarre. It is located on the Messina–Syracuse railway line.

== History ==
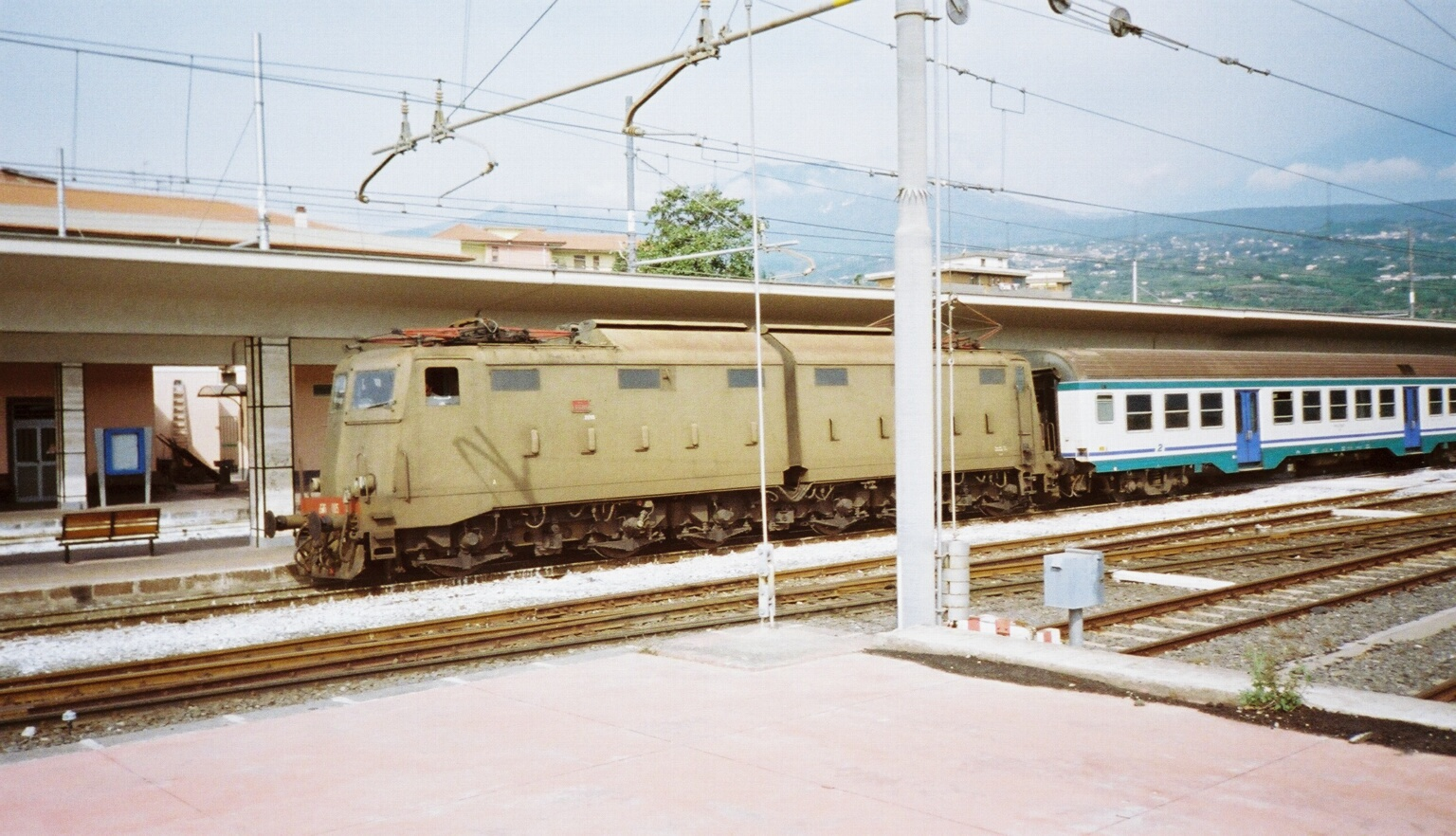
Treno regionale in arrivo a Giarre

The station was built following the construction of the Ionian coastal railway, implemented by the Victor Emmanuel Railway as part of the project to connect the production areas of the east coast of the Island to the extreme northern strip of Sicily and the port of Messina via the railway.

The station was inaugurated at the same time as the opening of the Taormina-Giardini-Catania railway section on January 3, 1867.

Starting from the official time of 1945 the station took the name of "Ionia", qs a result of the 1942 name change of the two municipalities, unified in 1939, of Giarre and Riposto.

In 1948 the station reverted to the previous name of Giarre-Riposto.

In the mid-1980s, the station was upgraded to double track; the shelters were also built for the use of the 1º, 2º and 3º tracks and the platforms were lengthened.
