= Ceva Grimaldi family =

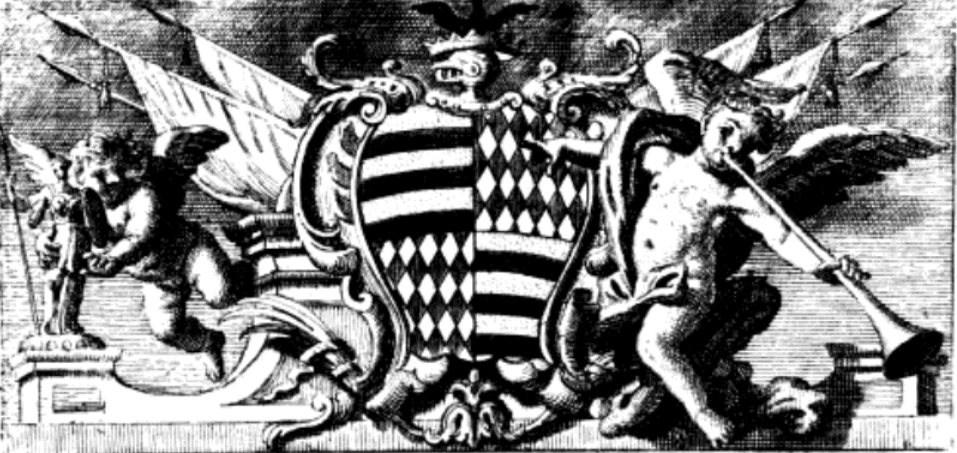
Ceva Grimaldi coat of arms depicted in 1737

The Ceva Grimaldi are an Italian noble family established in Southern Italy since the 16th century but whose origins are in Piedmont and Liguria and date back to the 10th century. The main titles associated with this branch of the Ceva family are Marchese di Pietracatella and Duca di Telese.

== Ceva family ==
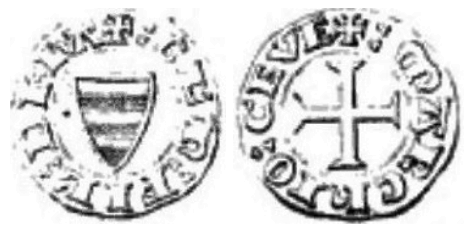
Silver coin minted by the Marchesi di Ceva in the 14th century

The Ceva family is a descendant branch of the Aleramici dynasty founded by William of Montferrat in the 10th century named for his son Aleramo. By the early 12th century, the family had vast landholdings in Piedmont and northern Liguria, including the town of Ceva and its surrounding area. On the death of Bonifacio del Vasto c. 1125, his son Anselmo received the newly created Marquisate of Ceva. Anselmo's son, Guglielmo Anselmo, was the first member of the family to use Ceva as a surname. By 1389, one of Guglielmo Anselmo's descendants, Gherardo Ceva, established himself in Genoa and became the progenitor of the Ceva branch that eventually added Grimaldi to its surname. Another branch established itself in France in the early 16th century and acquired the Barony of Fléchères. Their surname became Sève. The branch that remained associated with the Marquisate of Ceva and based in Piedmont produced a number of Roman Catholic prelates, including several bishops and a cardinal.

After Giorgio II di Ceva (floruit 1268–1324), the Marquisate of Ceva began an inexorable decline, partly because each generation divided its holdings equally between their various sons. The family split into several branches, including Ceva San Vitale, Ceva di Nuceto, and Ceva di Lesegno, and its members became scattered throughout Piedmont. The death in 1845 of Abbot Celestino Ceva di Lesegno, the son of marchese Giovanni Giacomo, marked the end of the Ceva family's presence in the town which they once ruled. Although the Marquisate of Ceva is long gone, the town's coat of arms still uses that of the Ceva family.

During the course of its history, the Ceva family and its various branches, including the Ceva Grimaldi branch, held five marquisates, three duchies, one county, and twenty-three fiefdoms. They intermarried with numerous other noble families from both Northern and Southern Italy, including the Adorno, Balzo, Caracciolo, Carafa, Pignatelli, Merode, Pallavicino, and Lanza families.

== Ceva Grimaldi family ==
In 1528, the Republic of Genoa under Andrea Doria reformed the system which organized its patrician families into alberghi. The number of alberghi was limited to 28, and to qualify as an albergo going forward, a family had to have at least six households. The Genoese Ceva family was too small to qualify and along with sixteen other families was attached to the Grimaldi, one of the four principal dynasties of Genoa. The first member of the family to bear the double name was Francesco Ceva Grimaldi who was living in Genoa at the time and married to a noblewoman of the Giustiniani family. The Ceva Grimaldi family's new coat of arms incorporated both the Ceva's (six alternating horizontal gold and black stripes) and the Grimaldi's (alternating vermilion and silver lozenges).

Coats of arms

Ceva

Ceva Grimaldi

Grimaldi

In 1545, Francesco Ceva Grimaldi's son, Cristofaro, transferred the family's seat to Naples to pursue his business affairs. Once in Naples, he purchased the fiefs of Telese, Pietracatella, Solopaca, and several other holdings. His sons Giovanni Francesco (1559–1618) and Giovanni Antonio (1561–1616) ultimately became the heads of the two branches of the Ceva Grimaldi—the Marchesi di Pietracatella and the Duchi di Telese. Cristofaro and his wife, Claudia Adorno, also had four daughters: Emilia and Giovanna, both of whom married into the Carafa family; Cecilia, who married into the Capece family; and Silvia, who married into the Di Capua family. The Di Capua family were the original owners of the fief of Pietracatella.

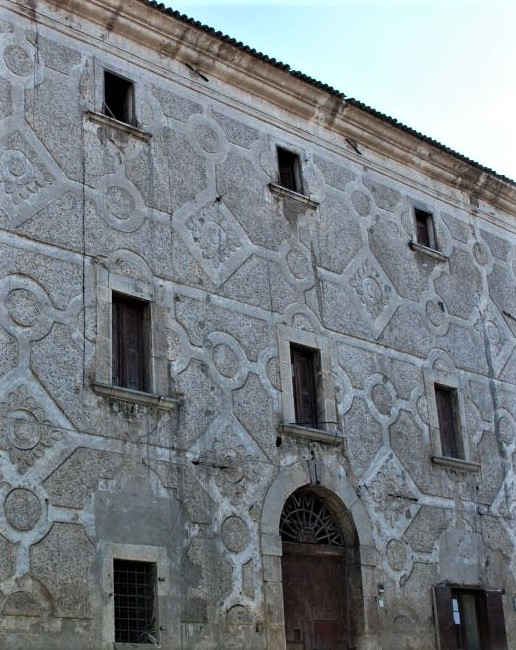
Facade of the ducal palace in Solopaca

As the eldest son, Giovanni Francesco had initially inherited the Pietracatella, Telese, and Solopaca fiefs. He served in the army of Philip II but left Naples after a quarrel and returned to Genoa. There he served as a captain of the Republic of Genoa and a colonel in the militia of Riviera di Levante. He was also a diplomat on the part of Spain to the courts of Modena, Turin, Florence, and Mantua. He returned to Naples in 1606 and was granted the title Marchese di Pietracatella by Philip III. His marriage to Vittoria del Balzo produced eight children. His first three sons predeceased him and he was succeeded as Marchese di Pietracatella by his fourth son, Francesco Aleramo. The Marchesi di Pietracatella branch owned palazzi in Nola, Pietracatella, Montorio, and Naples where they also acquired the Palazzo Pisanelli through the marriage of the 4th Marchese di Pietracatella, Giuseppe Maria (1705–1757), to Angela Pisanelli. Their son and the 5th Marchese di Pietracatella, Francesco Maria (1737–1802), inherited the title Duca delle Pesche from his mother which was passed down to future generations. The family also held the titles of Marchese di Montorio, and Barone di Gambatesa, Macchia and Venafro. In the 19th century the Marchesi di Pietracatella branch produced prominent civil servants and politicians. This branch continues into the 21st century, although the title Marchese di Pietracatella and all noble titles in Italy ceased to be recognized when the monarchy was abolished in 1946.

During the years that Giovanni Francesco was away from Naples, his younger brother, Giovanni Antonio, had administered his holdings. In recognition of this, Giovanni Francesco gave him the Telese and Solopaca fiefs. Giovanni Antonio was formally granted the title of Duca di Telese by Philip III in 1609. His grandson, the third Duca di Telese (also called Giovanni Antonio), built the family's ducal palace in Solopaca between 1672 and 1673. Solopaca was used as their seat because the town of Telese had been destroyed in 1349 by an earthquake which had also released lingering clouds of sulfur dioxide into the air. The palace served not only as their residence but also as the administrative headquarters of the duchy and had a court of justice and jail on the ground floor. When Angelo Ceva Grimaldi 5th Duca di Telese died without children in 1710, his holdings reverted to the state. A distant cousin, Marcello Ceva Grimaldi (1652–1725), subsequently bought back Telese and reclaimed the title in 1723 becoming the 6th Duca di Telese. He was succeeded by his nephew, Filippo (1674–1763) 7th Duca di Telese. With the death of Filippo, the Duchi di Telese branch became extinct. During the 17th and early 18th centuries, this branch produced a number of high-ranking officers in the armies of Charles II and Philip V of Spain.

== Members ==
Members of the Ceva and Ceva Grimaldi families include:

- Guglielmo di Ceva, Marchese di Ceva from 1190 to 1220. He greatly consolidated the power and political influence of the family, forming alliances with Asti and Alba.
- Alice of Saluzzo (died 1292), Italian noblewoman who married Richard Fitzalan, Earl of Arundel. According to The Complete Peerage, her mother was Luisa di Ceva, the daughter of Giorgio I di Ceva and the sister of Giorgio II di Ceva.
- Giorgio II di Ceva (floruit 1268–1324), participant in the battles between Asti and Charles of Anjou and the last great exponent of the family in the Middle Ages. He was also known as "il Nano" (the Dwarf).
- Federico di Ceva (1317–1349), Roman Catholic Bishop of Albenga from 1329 until his death. He had been the administrator of the diocese for a year under the previous bishop, on whose death he was elevated to bishop. He was only 22 at the time and received special dispensation from Pope John XXII to assume the post despite his young age.

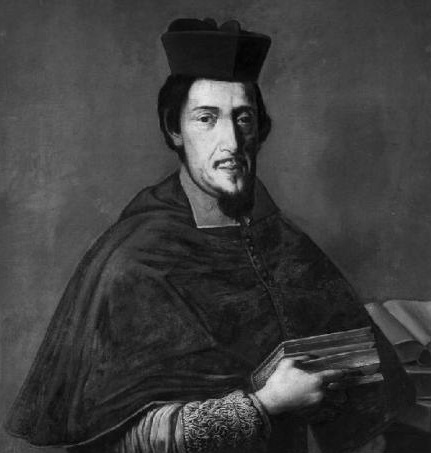
Carlo Francesco Ceva, Bishop of Tortona (1683–1700)

- Giovanni di Ceva (died 1391), Roman Catholic Bishop of Albenga, from 1350 to 1363 when he became the Bishop of Tortona. According to an early 19th-century history of Tortona, he had been "unjustly persecuted" by Galeazzo Visconti, who eventually forced him to leave the diocese.
- Bonifacio da Ceva (c.1465–1517), Minister General of the French Franciscans. His major work was Firmamentum trium ordinum beatissimi patris nostri Francisci, a detailed history of the Franciscan order which became a reference point in the order's discipline debates
- Raffaele di Ceva (died 1518), Roman Catholic Bishop of Asti and later Bishop of Melfi. Originally a member of the Franciscan order, he also served as the Papal treasurer in the mid-1480s. During his time as Bishop of Asti, he was responsible for the embellishment of the entrance to Asti Cathedral.
- Febo Ceva (1490–c.1543) and his younger brother Ghilardino, notorious mercenaries of the early 1500s known for their indiscriminate violence. In their efforts to secure the wealth and titles of their cousins for themselves, they attempted to murder one of them (Giovanni Vincenzo) and succeeded in murdering another (Giovanni Andrea) in a particularly brutal attack. They died as fugitives from justice. Ghildardino committed suicide by stabbing himself in the chest. They are briefly mentioned in The Book of the Courtier. Febo was also the subject of an 1870 historical novel, Febo dei marchesi di Ceva, by Leopoldo Viglierchio and a 2019 biography, La vera storia di Febo Marchese di Ceva by Giammario Odello.
- Cristofaro Ceva Grimaldi (died 1591), soldier and administrator who moved the Ceva Grimaldi family seat from Genoa to Naples in 1545. According to an early 18th-century history of the family, he had previously been in the city when he was a very young soldier in the Black Bands. In 1557 he was appointed by the Viceroy of Naples, Fernando Álvarez de Toledo, to become Treasurer General of the Spanish campaign in Italy against Pope Paul IV and to supervise the provisioning of the troops. His successful service led to similar appointments by successive Viceroys. He purchased the fief of Pietracatella in 1566 and the fiefs of Telese and Solopaca in 1575. He also founded the convent of San Nicola di Bari and its associated church in Pietracatella c. 1580.
- Ludovico Pallavicino Ceva (died 1598) Roman Catholic Bishop of Saluzzo (1581–1583) and subsequently Bishop of Nice from 1583 to his death. Known for his work with the poor, he brought the Confraternity of White Penitents to Nice to establish and run an orphanage in what later became the Hôpital Saint-Roch. He died of a sudden illness in Èze while on a pastoral visit there.
- Giuseppe di Ceva (died 1633), Roman Catholic Bishop of Ivrea from 1614 until his death during which time he held two synods. Known for his work with the poor, he also restored the diocesan archives which had been badly damaged in a fire and had the main room of the episcopal palace decorated with frescos depicting his predecessors.

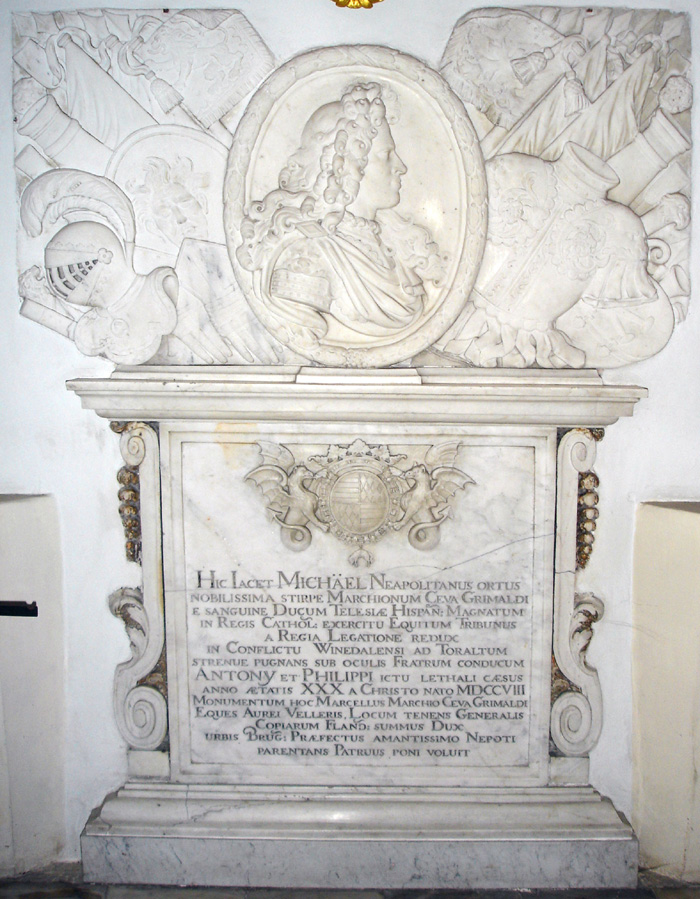
Tomb of Michele Ceva Grimaldi (1678–1708) in the Church of St. Walburga, Bruges

- Francesco Adriano Ceva (1580–1655), Roman Catholic cardinal. Prior to his elevation to cardinal, he had served as the secretary to Maffeo Barberini's legation to France. When Barberini was elected to the papacy as Pope Urban VIII, Ceva served as his nuncio to France.
- Carlo Francesco Ceva (1625–1700), Roman Catholic Bishop of Tortona from 1683 until his death. Prior to his appointment as bishop, he had carried out various civil and ecclesiastical duties in Rome. As a bishop, he was known for his pastoral work and for the embellishment of both the episcopal palace and the Tortona Cathedral.
- Marcello Ceva Grimaldi (1652–1725), 6th Duca di Telese, high-ranking officer in the armies of both Charles II and Philip V of Spain who distinguished himself in the Battle of Fleurus. Philip V appointed him Lieutenant General and Knight of the Order of the Golden Fleece in 1709.
- Bartolomeo Ceva Grimaldi (1670–1707), 4th Duca di Telese, primarily known for his participation in the 1701 Conspiracy of Macchia. He became involved through a series of events that began in 1694 with a heated dispute over seating priority during a performance at the Teatro San Bartolomeo. In the ensuing fracas, he and his relative Giuseppe Capece killed Pompeo D'Anna, the son of a prominent Neapolitan citizen. Bartolomeo was eventually sentenced to five years of exile on the Island of Ischia where he nurtured his hatred for the Spanish Viceroy, Luis Francisco de la Cerda, whom he blamed for his fate. When his exile ended, he and Capece joined the Macchia conspiracy in revenge against Spanish rule. On the failure of the conspiracy, he fled to Austria with his brother Angelo but was tried in absentia and his holdings confiscated in 1702. He returned to Naples and regained his holdings when the Habsburgs took control of the Kingdom of Naples in 1707. He died later that year in a shipwreck in the Gulf of Lion.
- Michele Ceva Grimaldi (1678–1708), high-ranking officer in the army of Philip V of Spain and nephew of Marcello, the 6th Duca di Telese. He died in the Battle of Wijnendale and is buried in the Church of St. Walburga in Bruges.
- Giuseppe Ceva Grimaldi (1777–1862), 6th Marchese di Pietracatella, statesman and writer who served as President of the Council of Ministers of the Kingdom of Two Sicilies
- Francesco Ceva Grimaldi (1806–1864), historian and administrator and nephew of Giuseppe. He was a Knight of the Sacred Military Constantinian Order of Saint George and the Royal Order of Francis I.
- Francesco Ceva Grimaldi (1831–1899), 7th Marchese di Pietracatella, Senator of the Kingdom of Italy and Commander of the Order of the Crown of Italy
- Valerio Ceva Grimaldi (born 1976), the great-grandson of the 9th Marchese di Pietracatella, Francesco Ceva Grimaldi (1877–1937). He is a journalist and the author of Napoli insolita e segreta, a guide to the lesser known aspects of Naples (also published in English as Secret Naples).
- Marco Ceva Grimaldi (born 2001), the 11th Marchese of Pietracatella, comes from an Italian noble family. In the early 2000s, his family moved to Germany, where he was raised. Today, he is a multifaceted entrepreneur and a notable figure on Instagram. His posts reflect his passion for writing, as he is currently working on a book and considering following in his family's footsteps as an author. .
