= Francesco Adriano Ceva =

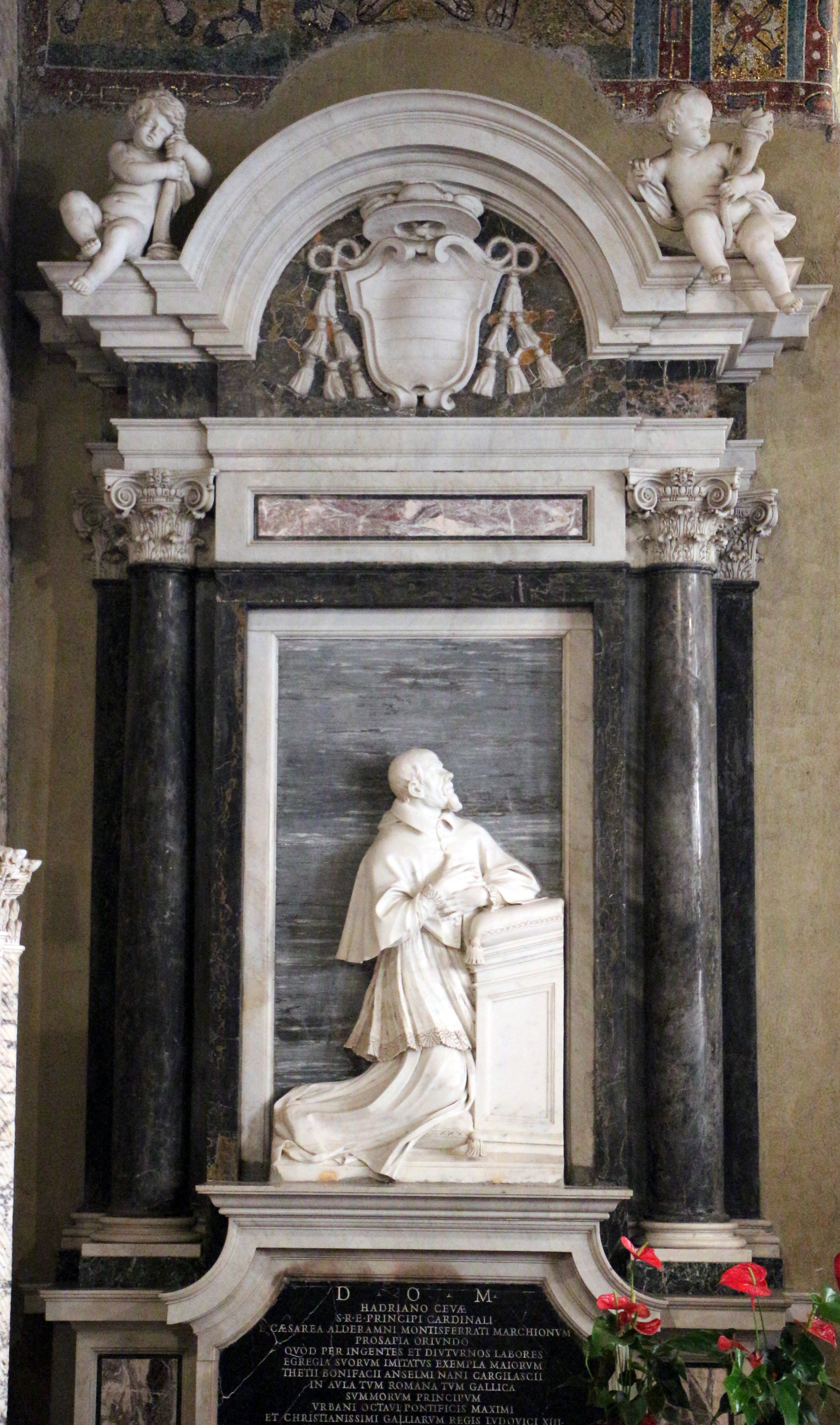
Monument in the Lateran Baptistry

Francesco Adriano Ceva (1580 - 12 October 1655) was a Catholic Cardinal from Savoy.

Francesco Adriano Ceva was born in 1580 in Mondovì, Savoy to the House of Ceva; Marquises of Ceva. His birth name may have been Hadriano or simply Adriano only.

As a young man, he went to Rome and became a prelate to Cardinal Maffeo Barberini, who was later elected to the papal throne as Pope Urban VIII. He served as the secretary of Barberini's legation to France and as a conclavist to the Cardinal during the 1623 conclave. It is said he was responsible, at least in part, for masterminding Barberini's ascent to the papacy.

Pope Urban's election meant promotion for Ceva and he became a domestic prelate to the Pope. Later he was sent as a nuncio extraordinaire to France.

He was further rewarded when Urban elevated him to cardinal in 1643 and he was made Cardinal-Priest at Santa Prisca. The following year, Pope Urban died and Ceva participated in the conclave of 1644, which elected Pope Innocent X. He later participated in the conclave of 1655, which elected Pope Alexander VII. He died a few months later on 12 October 1655.
