= Still engine =

Combined-cycle piston engine

The Still engine was a piston engine that simultaneously used both steam power from an external boiler, and internal combustion from gasoline or diesel, in the same unit. The waste heat from the cylinder and internal combustion exhaust was directed to the steam boiler, resulting in claimed fuel savings of up to 10%.

== History ==
William Still

The inventor, William Joseph Still, patented his device in 1917, and on 26 May 1919 he and his collaborator Captain Francis Acland (1857–1943, a consulting engineer formerly of the Royal Artillery) announced it at a meeting in London, chaired by steam turbine inventor Charles Algernon Parsons, at the Royal Society of Arts. Acland described a continuous process by which a double-acting cylinder is powered on one side by internal combustion and on the other by steam from a boiler heated principally by the waste heat from the water jacket and exhaust gases. He explained how the reserve of energy represented by the steam pressure in the boiler provided for any occasional overload which would defeat a standard internal combustion engine of the same power. Independent heating of the boiler was occasionally used, to provide extra power for exceptional conditions, and in the first stage of operation to allow the engine to start itself from steam power alone, even against a load.

Still was not the first in this field; a similar system, whereby compressed air (instead of gearing) was to transfer the power from an internal combustion engine and steam recovered from its cooling system was to augment the compressed air, had been patented in 1903 by Captain Paul Lucas-Girardville (a French military aviator) and Louis Mékarski.

== Development ==
=== Marine ===
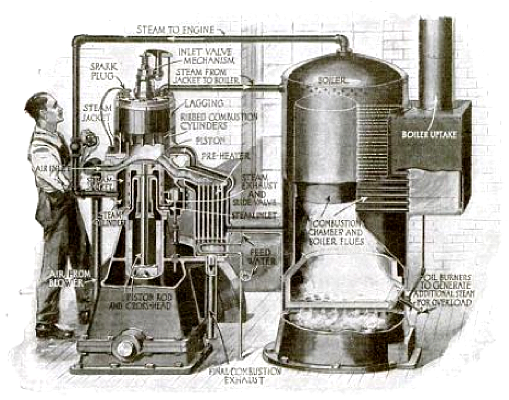
Still engine installation: "The explosion of the charge drives the piston down. Steam pressure on the other side then drives the piston up".

In 1924 Scotts Shipbuilding and Engineering Company of Greenock, Scotland, put a diesel-fuelled marine version, the Scott-Still regenerative engine, into production, with the first pair of engines installed in Blue Funnel Line's twin-screw Dolius. The trial was successful, and in 1928 Blue Funnel commissioned a larger and faster ship, the Eurybates, with this propulsion system. However, the requirement to carry marine engineering officers certified with both steam and motor qualifications, meaning extra crew members and wages, and the extra complexity with consequent higher maintenance costs, offset the fuel savings, and conventional diesel engines were later installed in their place.

=== Railway ===
In 1926 Kitson and Company, locomotive builders of Leeds, England, produced a steam–diesel hybrid locomotive, the Kitson Still locomotive. This was loaned for trials to the London and North Eastern Railway and used successfully to haul heavy coal trains, but the difference in the cost of coal used by a conventional locomotive, against the fuel oil used by the hybrid, was not great. When Kitson's failed in 1934, a failure to which the development costs of the hybrid locomotive had contributed, the receivers sold the machine for scrap.

=== Decline ===
Developments of larger diesel engines in the 1930s, with improved methods of power transmission, meant that the principal advantages of the Still engine – the ability to provide for direct-drive starts from rest and additional power at times of temporary high load – was lost, and further development ended.
