= Francesco Ceva Grimaldi (historian) =

Italian historian, writer, and administrator

- Coat of arms of the Ceva Grimaldi family
- Born: 30 November 1806; Naples, Italy
- Died: 20 July 1864 (aged 57); Naples, Italy
- Occupations: Historian and writer; Administrator
- Relatives: Francesco Ceva Grimaldi (cousin)

Francesco Ceva Grimaldi (30 November 1806 – 20 July 1864) was an Italian historian, writer, and administrator. He was the cousin of the Italian senator Francesco Ceva Grimaldi (1831–1899).

A member of a noble family of Genoese origin that established itself in Naples in the 16th century, Ceva Grimaldi was born in Naples, the son of Marcello Ceva Grimaldi and Camilla Maria Correggio. He wrote a number of books, the most well-known of which is Memorie storiche della città di Napoli. He was married firstly to Raffaella Monforte (died 1846) and secondly to Maria Lanza di Trebbia. Ceva Grimaldi died in Naples at the age of 57. His eldest son, also called Marcello, inherited the title of Marchese di Pietracatella in 1899 when Senator Francesco Ceva Grimaldi died without children.
