= Castello di Villagonia =

- Taormina, Sicily, Italy

Site information
- Type: castle

Location
- Coordinates: 37°50′43.92″N 15°16′57.07″E

Site history
- Built by: De Spucches family
- Fate: Demolished, 1913

The Castello di Villagonia was a castle near the seashore of Taormina, Sicily. It was built in the Middle Ages by the De Spucches noble family. In the early 16th century, the castle was integrated into the Capo Schisò defensive system to defend the area from raids by the Barbary pirates.

The castle eventually became the property of the San Martino family. The castle was expropriated in 1913 from last owners, Giuseppe San Martino and his wife. It was subsequently demolished to make way for the Taormina-Giardini station of the Messina-Catania railway.
