= Mekarski system =

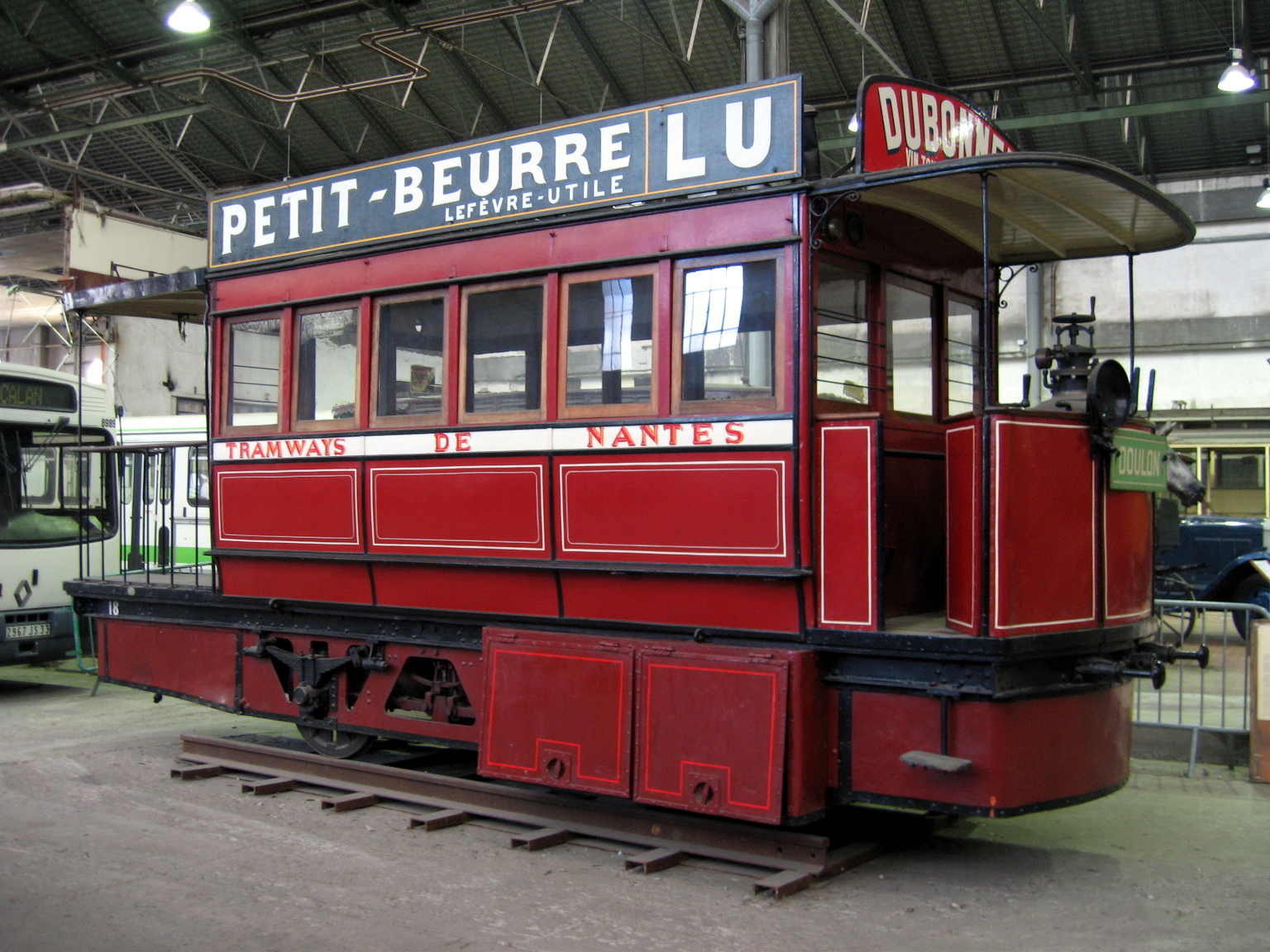
Preserved Nantes compressed air tramcar at the AMTUIR museum

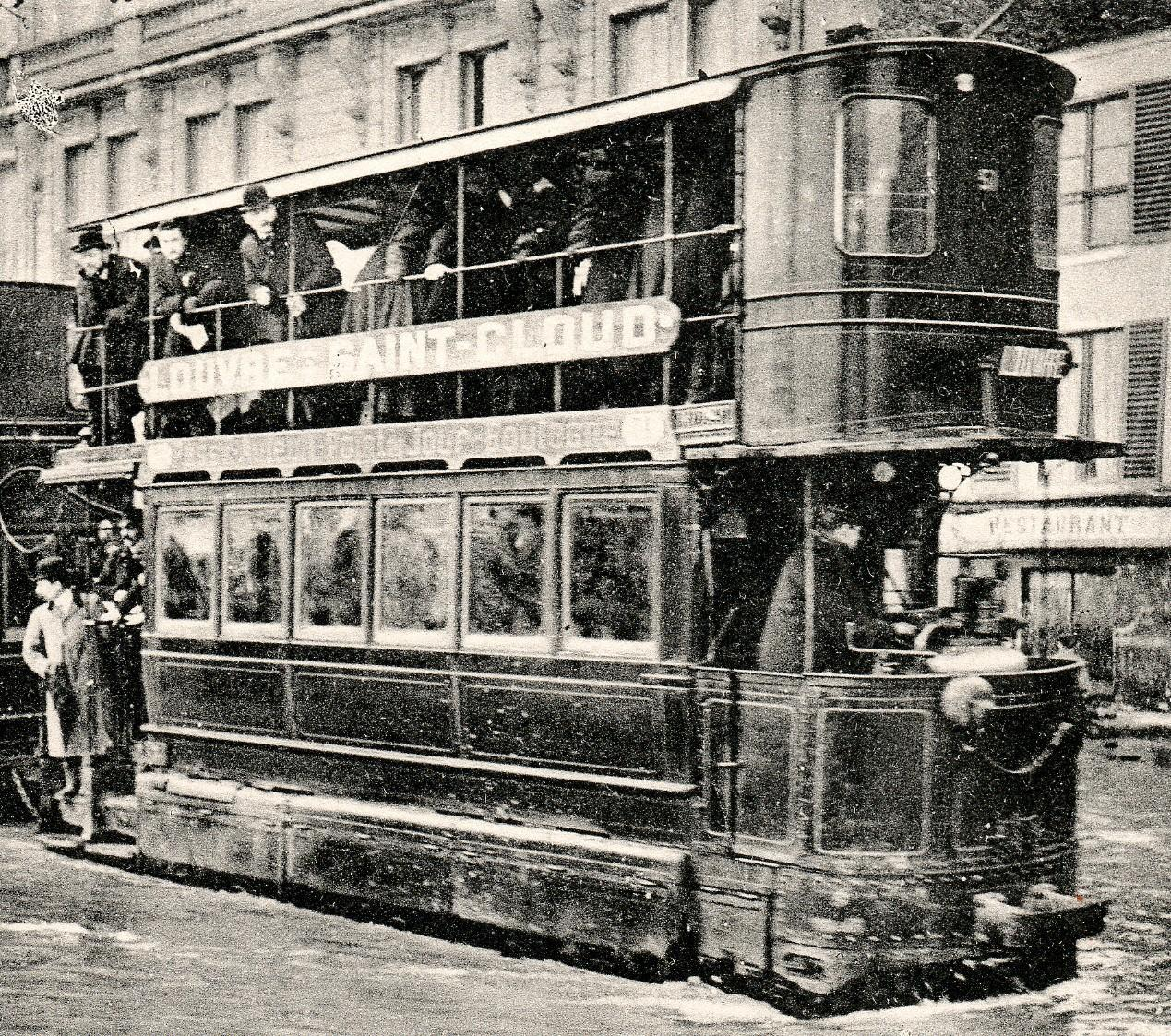
Mekarski tram in Paris during 1910 flooding, the top of the hot water tank and the regulator can be seen in front of the car; the 9 air tanks are below the tram.

The Mekarski system was a compressed-air propulsion system for trams invented by Louis Mékarski or Louis Mékarsky (the correct spelling is uncertain) in the 1870s. He worked in France, was born in 1843 in Clermont-Ferrand (center of France) of Polish origin. Many references to him use the Polish name Ludwik Mękarski.

== Overview ==
A problem with compressed-air propulsion is that the air cools as it expands, which can lead to the formation of ice in the power cylinders. Mekarski sought to overcome this problem by heating the air with steam, produced in a small boiler called a bouillotte. It is uncertain whether the steam was mixed with the air, or whether there was a heat exchanger.

It was a single-stage engine in that air was expanded in one piston and then exhausted. The air was reheated after leaving the tank and before entering the engine. The reheater bubbled air through a hot water tank, picking up hot water vapor to improve the engine's range. An improved engine contained a high-pressure cylinder of 5 1/2 inches operating at 50-150 lb/sq.in and a low-pressure cylinder of 8 inches, with an 8-inch piston stroke.

The system was promoted as being suitable for use in congested streets and in tunnels, as compressed air produced no smoke or flames, and thus would not disturb horses or fill the carriage with soot and sparks like a steam engine.

But the technology had two decisive disadvantages. Firstly, sometimes the stored energy was not sufficient to bring the tram back to the filling station and secondly, the compressed air hoses tended to burst from time to time with great hiss and frighten the tram riders.

== Applications ==
The system was tested in Paris in 1876 and introduced to the Nantes tramway in 1879. It seems to have been a success at Nantes with a fleet of 94 trams in 1900. The Mekarski tramcars continued in use there until 1917, when they were replaced by electric trams.

The system was used in England on the Wantage Tramway but did not find favour there because the compressor plant used more than four times as much coal as a steam locomotive. Between 1881 and 1883 an improved air car was used on the Caledonian Road tramway of the London Street Tramway Company.

Furthermore, the system was in use in Bern from 1890 till 1902. There was 3.1 km long line with 10 cars in operation, which went from Bärengraben via Bern railway station to the cemetery. The compressed air was generated by a compressor driven by a water Jonval turbine with water from the Aare. The filling station was at Bärengraben. It was an advantage that the cars on the return trip had to go only downhill, so when they run out of air, they had still the possibility to reach the filling station. Nevertheless, the filling used quite some time. Therefore, four filling connections have been provided, which were used by two to three cars simultaneously. Four cars where on the route service and the rest was in the shed for maintenance and repairs. The operating pressure was 480 psi, the speed was 9.3 mph. Each run consumed about 2100 liters of compressed air.

== Preservation ==
One Mekarski tramcar is preserved at Nantes.

== See also ==
- Diesel-pneumatic locomotive
- Fireless locomotive
- Pneumatic motor
- Tram engine

== Sources ==
"Popular Miscellany" in Popular Science Monthly Volume 19, July 1881

- See external links
