= Giardini =

Giardini is a surname of Italian origin. Notable people with the surname include:

- Anne Giardini (born 1959), Canadian lawyer and an author
- Eliane Giardini (born 1952), Brazilian actress
- Felice Giardini (1716–1796), Italian composer and violinist
- Giuliano Giardini (born 1955), retired Italian alpine skier

== See also ==
- Giardini della Biennale, area of Venice, Italy where the Venice Biennale Art Festival is held
