= Guglielmo Cappa =

Italian engineer (1844–1905)

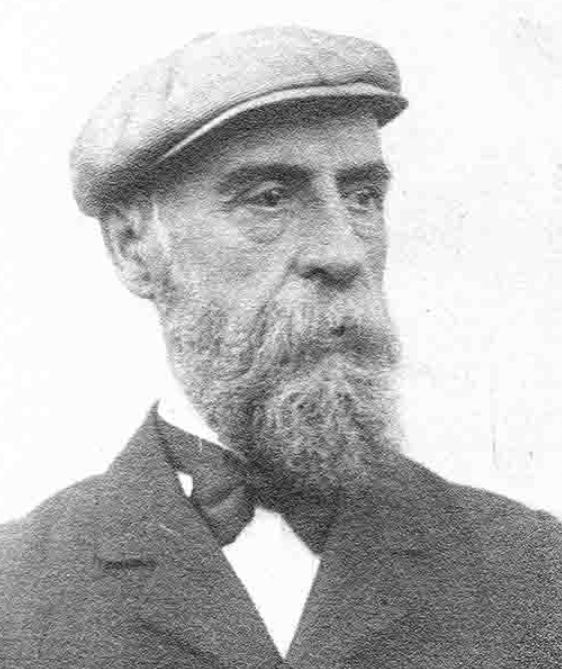

Guglielmo Cappa (21 July 1844 – 1 September 1905) was an Italian engineer who became Head of the Material and Traction Service of the newly formed Italian State Railways (FS) in 1905.

== Overview ==
Guglielmo Cappa was born in Garlasco, in the Province of Pavia on 21 July 1844. He attended high school and spent two years at University in Pavia. He then obtained a degree in engineering in Turin.

== Career ==
In 1871 he was hired by the Società per le Strade Ferrate Meridionali and was engaged in the construction of the difficult line between L'Aquila and Sulmona. He later became Head of the Traction Division of the Società per le Strade Ferrate Calabro-Sicule. In 1885 when the Sicilian railroads were broken up with the establishment of Rete Sicula, headed by Riccardo Bianchi, Cappa became the director of the Material and Traction Service. He was one of the main promoters of the establishment of the ferry in the Strait of Messina that began at the end of 1899.

The work of the engineer Cappa was decisive in the design of new locomotives such as the RS Class 300, which later became the FS Class 410, but his main work was the excellent RS Class 400 tank locomotives, later FS Class 910.[Locomotiva_FS_910] These were designed for the difficult Messina - Palermo line with the demanding Peloritani pass. After nationalization, they were transferred to Milan where they gave excellent service on suburban trains.

A characteristic of the locomotives designed by Cappa was the use of Walschaerts valve gear which became widely adopted by the FS. In 1905 Riccardo Bianchi, director of the newly constituted Ferrovie dello Stato, wanted Cappa in Rome to direct the Material and Traction Service.

== Family ==
Guglielmo Cappa was the father of Giulio Cesare Cappa, who became an automobile designer for the firm Aquila Italiana.

== Death ==
In Rome, a tragic fate overtook Guglielmo Cappa a few months after his inauguration. On 1 September 1905, he was shot dead in his office in Via Boncompagni, by the Sardinian Giuseppe Cossu, who held him responsible for the lack of promotion of his son from stoker to driver.
