= Steam diesel hybrid locomotive =

Railway locomotive with piston engine

A steam diesel hybrid locomotive was a railway locomotive with a piston engine which could run on either steam from a boiler or diesel fuel. Examples were built in the United Kingdom, Soviet Union and Italy but the relatively high cost of fuel oil, or failure to resolve problems caused by technical complexity, meant that the designs were not pursued.

== Kitson-Still system ==
In 1926 Kitson and Company, Leeds, built an experimental example for the London and North Eastern Railway, using as their model the Still engine already in use for stationary and marine applications. It was on trial until 1934, but then scrapped. It was designed because a steam engine offered a high starting torque—a tractive force of 25,450 lbf (113.2 kN) was available—while a diesel engine offered a better fuel efficiency, and it was an attempt to combine the benefits of both in one machine.

=== Construction ===
In outline, the machine resembled a conventional 2-6-2T steam locomotive, but it had four pairs of horizontally opposed cylinders (13.5 in (340 mm) bore × 15.5 in (390 mm) stroke) mounted longitudinally above the frame and driving a crankshaft placed between them, with the further drivetrain powered by gears. The cylinders were made double-ended, with the rod end of each cylinder for steam and the closed end fitted with a diesel injector. (Some drawings, published in contemporary magazines, show only two pairs of cylinders and it seems that this was one of the design features that was changed during development.) The boiler, with a diameter of only 51 in (130 cm) and a small internal firebox, was mounted above. The "regenerator", capturing heat from the exhaust, was integral with the boiler and had 38 tubes totalling a heating area of 508 sq ft (47.2 m^{2}). The driving position was in the usual place behind the boiler, and tanks—400 imp gal (1,800 L) for fuel and 1,000 imp gal (4,500 L) for water—were mounted on the frame at the rear, one above the other.

=== Operation ===
The sequence of operation began with heating the boiler in the normal way, but using fuel oil instead of coal. The start from rest was made with steam power, but at about 5 mph (8.0 km/h) the diesel injectors were started and the steam turned off. The waste heat from the cylinder jackets and diesel exhaust then maintained the boiler in steam for auxiliary functions (brakes and whistle) and in readiness to supplement the diesel power if required, or for the next start. The temperature of the water jacket, maintained at considerably above boiling point, assisted the compression ignition of the diesel fuel and only a relatively low compression ratio was required. Because steam power provided the torque required for starting, no form of variable transmission was necessary and a permanent reduction geartrain of ratio 1·878 to 1 was fitted.

Overall power output (800 bhp under diesel, 1,000 bhp when supplemented with steam) did not compare well with conventional steam locomotives, although the performance on gradients was good because of the gearing. During the trials it was used successfully with coal trains and it proved very efficient in terms of fuel used, because the waste heat from the diesel power was recovered. However its running costs depended on the price differential between coal and oil and this was not favourable. When Kitson & Co. failed in 1934 the LNER handed the machine back to the company's receivers and it was dismantled.

== Cristiani compressed steam system ==
The Italian Cristiani Compressed Steam System used the process of mechanical vapour recompression. A diesel engine compressed steam which was then fed to conventional steam engine cylinders. The exhaust steam was re-compressed and used again. There must have been a small boiler to generate the initial charge of steam but this is not shown in the diagram.

The steam was used mainly as a transmission system but the locomotive does count as a hybrid because some steam storage was provided. A possible advantage of the system was that it enabled existing steam locomotives to be converted to diesel operation but this did not come to fruition.

Patents for the system were held by Severino Cristiani and Secondo Sacerdole in Italy and it was promoted in England by Captain William Peter Durtnall. A trial was made in England, using two "Paragon" marine petrol engines, under the name "Paragon-Cristiani". The equipment was mounted on a 0-6-0 chassis (works number 3513/1923) built by Hawthorn Leslie and Company. It was not a success and the chassis was converted to a conventional 0-6-0ST named "Stagshaw" which is preserved on the Tanfield Railway.

== Other trials ==
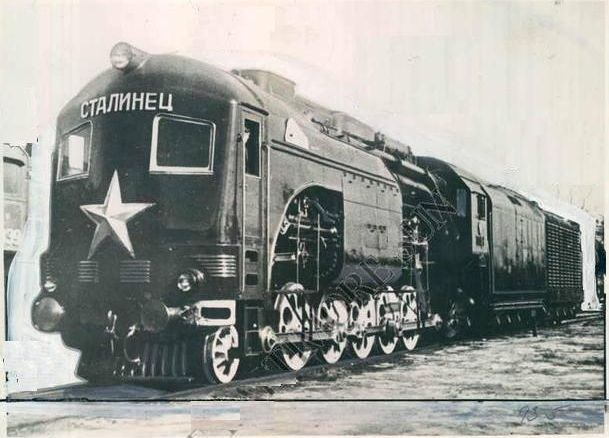
Soviet Locomotive TP1Stalinets

=== Soviet Union ===
The Soviet Union built three large experimental locomotives between 1939 and 1946.

The first prototype, numbered 8000, a 2-8-2 from the Vorishilovgrad works, had two pairs of outside double-acting opposing pistons; when diesel power was initiated, at about 20 km/h (12 mph), diesel fuel was injected into the centre portion between the pistons which thus became the compression-ignition chamber, while the outer ends of the cylinders continued to receive steam in the normal way. Although the unit remained in passenger service, intermittently, until 1946, when it was tested again. It was put into storage in 1948. It was not considered a success as its 25-tonne axle load was too high, it rode hard on the tracks and was prone to cracking cylinders.

TP1-1, the second prototype (illustrated right), under the name of Сталинец (Stalinets), was a cab-forward condensing 2-10-2 from the Kolomna works, used gas produced from an anthracite coal plant in the tender to fuel its spark-ignition internal combustion cylinders, along with anthracite pulverised in the gasification plant to heat the boiler. There were a total of eight pistons in four cylinders in an opposed-piston configuration; two steam cylinders and two coal gas cylinders. It was reported to have only functioned properly at speeds of 25–30 km/h and below as travelling faster for about 10–15 minutes would cause the gas mixture to combust prematurely when entering the combustion chamber. Issues were reportedly sorted out by 1941 but the project was abandoned during Operation Barbarossa and the outbreak of WW2 on Soviet territory.

Number 8001, the third experiment, also named Сталинец, was a unit developed from the previous Voroshilovgrad design in 1946. It was also a 2-10-2 configuration and had the centre space in the cylinders, between the opposed pistons, intended to combine compression ignition and steam expansive working in the same chamber. It was reportedly almost a complete disaster and placed in storage in 1948.

=== Switzerland ===
In 1925, Jakob Buchli of Switzerland obtained US patent 1559548 for a combined steam and internal-combustion engined locomotive. This differed from the Kitson-Still system in that there was no waste heat recovery and the steam and internal combustion engines had separate cylinders (vertically mounted in the tender), but both driving the same traction wheels. Buchli specified that "…the steam generator is supported upon one vehicle…and the steam and internal combustion engine cylinders together with their driving gear are carried by a separate truck or vehicle". His proposal was for the "steam generator vehicle" to be in the form of a traditional steam locomotive boiler with driver's cab, but without pistons. A "flexible pipe" would lead steam to the pistons within the "detachably coupled…truck" (tender). His claimed advantages were the reduced complexity of a combined transmission system, the improved comfort of the operators being separated from the driving cylinders and the differing maintenance requirements of steam and diesel (such as boiler washouts) being more easily accommodated when the units were detachable. It is not known whether any locomotives to Buchli's design were actually built.

=== United States ===
In 1954 Chicago inventor Charles Denker patented a system whereby the exhaust from a conventional four-stroke diesel engine was directed into a large-diameter steam cylinder. There was no boiler: instead a pump, operated by a cam driven from the common crankshaft, injected water (warmed by the diesel cylinder water jacket) into the steam cylinder so that it was instantly evaporated by the hot exhaust gases, powering the piston by expansion. Again, no operational examples are known.

== Works consulted ==
- Atkins, Philip (1999): The golden age of steam locomotive building. Atlantic Transport Publishers, Penryn, Cornwall and the National Railway Museum. ISBN 0-906899-87-7
- Kitson-Clark, Edwin (1927): An internal-combustion locomotive London: IME OCLC 931170624
- Le Fleming H.M.; Price, John Horace (1960): Russian Steam Lococmotives. London: John Marshwood Ltd
- Ross, David (2003): The encyclopedia of trains and locomotives: Thunder Bay Press, Berkeley, CA. ISBN 1-57145-971-5
- LNER encyclopedia accessed 19 November 2006
- The Kitson-Still steam-diesel locomotive accessed 9 February 2011
- Russian reforms Layout and images of Russian hybrid locomotives

== See also ==
- Diesel-Zarlatti locomotive
- Electric–steam locomotive
