= Rete Sicula =

Italian railway network

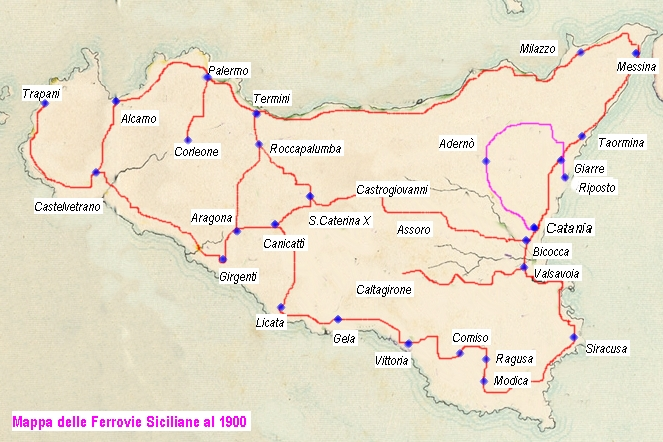
Ferrovie sicilia 1900

Rete Sicula (Sicilian Network) referred to all the railway lines in operation and under construction in Sicily which, following the 1885 Conventions, was assigned to the Società per le strade ferrate della Sicilia for operation.

== History ==
The company, formed with mainly foreign capital by a banking group based in Rome, took the place of the previous companies that ran the island railway lines including the failed Vittorio Emanuele Company, which at the time of taking over had not yet completed the construction programme expected. In 1885 the Sicula Network covered a total of 597 km. The network was gradually integrated with the sections from Palermo to Catania and, in 1895, those between Messina and Fiumetorto of the Palermo - Messina line. At the end of 1896 it had reached 1,093 km. In March 1896 the Sicula Network owned 156 steam locomotives, 456 coaches, 90 baggage cars and 2019 goods wagons. The network was nationalized and incorporated into the Ferrovie dello Stato Italiane in 1905.

== Locomotives ==
The network was equipped with its own Office for the design of rolling stock. This designed the excellent FS Class 910 locomotive. From 1901 to 1905 the engineer Riccardo Bianchi was the general manager of the company operating the Sicula Network.

== Ferries ==
The Sicula Network was connected to the Strait of Messina, in November 1893, with the obligation to make two daily ferry trips between Messina and Reggio Calabria. In addition, two daily ferry trips to Villa San Giovanni were established at the time of completion of the Southern Tyrrhenian Railways.

== Other railways ==
Some lines were not part of the Rete Sicula. These included the Palermo - Marsala - Trapani line (operated from 5 June 1881 by the Società della Ferrovia Sicula Occidentale), the Ferrovia Circumetnea and the Palermo – Corleone railway.
