= Società della Ferrovia Sicula Occidentale =

The Società della Ferrovia Sicula Occidentale (Railway Company of Western Sicily) was established in 1878 to construct a railway between Palermo, Marsala and Trapani.

== History ==
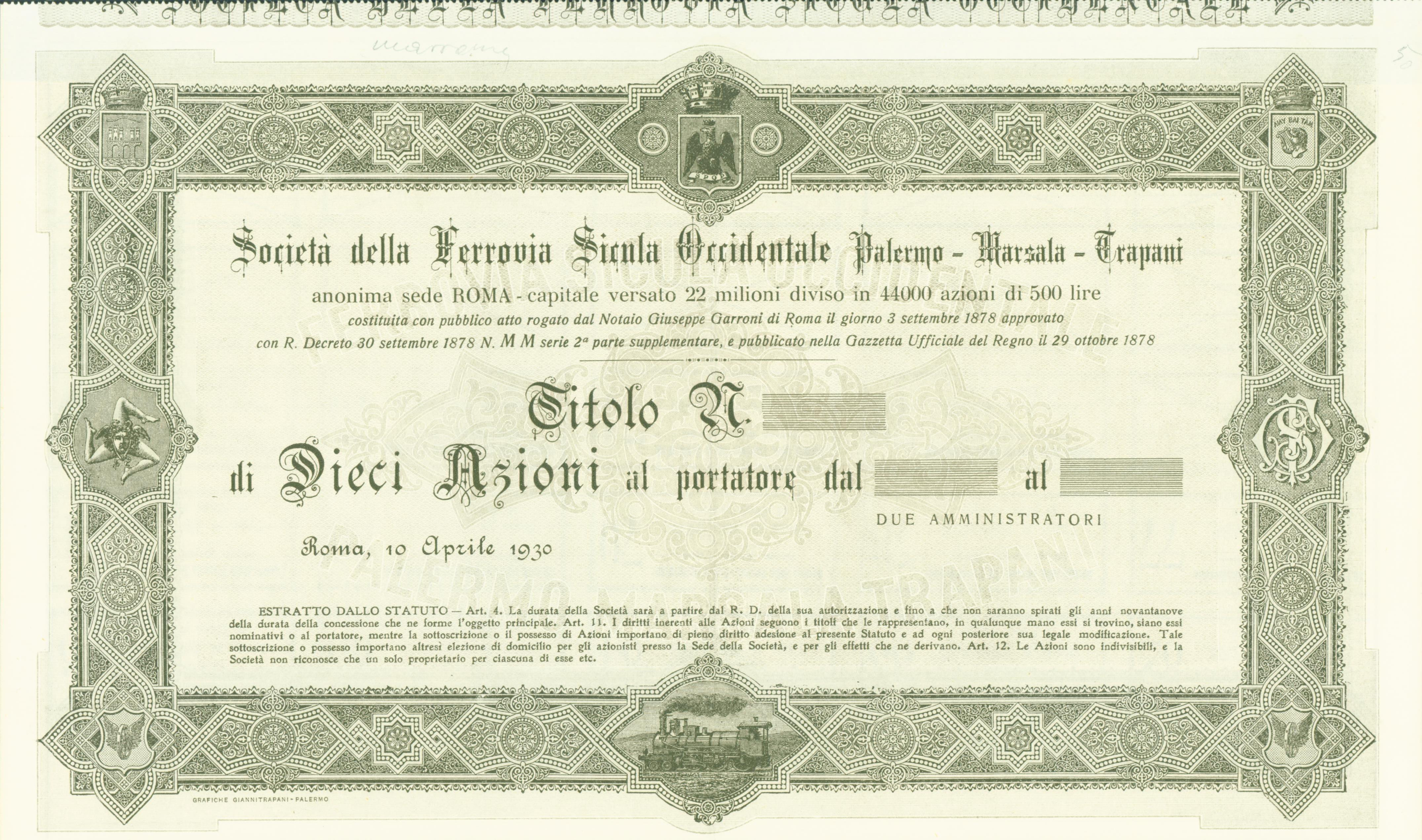
Share of the Soc. della Ferrovia Sicula Occidentale, issued 10 April 1930

The company was established in Rome under a notarial deed of 3 September 1878 with a paid-up capital of 22 million lire divided into 44,000 shares. It obtained government approval by Royal Decree of 30 September of the same year. it built and inaugurated the first railway connection between the two cities of Palermo and Trapani in 1881. Work began with the opening, on 1 June 1880, of the first stretch from the new Palermo Lolli station (later replaced by Palermo Notarbartolo railway station) in Partinico. A month later it inaugurated the stretch to the south connecting Trapani to Castelvetrano. In March 1881 it linked Partinico with Castellammare del Golfo and finally, on 5 June 1881, the entire route was completed with the activation of the central section of Castellammare del Golfo - Castelvetrano. In 1882 the company built the link, from Palermo Lolli to the Bivio Madonna dell'Orto, (more recently called Bivio Marittima, for the port of Palermo). This connected to the Calabrian-Sicilian railway but the connection was only used for goods traffic. In 1884, the company was registered in the official list of the Milan stock exchange.

== Locomotives ==
The company ordered 14 steam locomotives from Reale Opificio di Pietrarsa. They were delivered between 1880 and 1885 and numbered 1-20. In 1886 Ansaldo supplied locomotives 35 and 36 and, between 1891 and 1895, delivered another 6 units similar to the 1-20 group. Subsequently, Ansaldo, in 1901, provided the last unit, number 37, similar to 35 and 36.

== Nationalization ==
The company operated the Palermo - Trapani Railway via Castelvetrano until August 1, 1907, when it was incorporated into the Italian State Railways (FS). Of the 1-20 group of locomotives, 16 units were registered as FS Class 385, while the three units in the 35-37 group were registered as FS Class 388.
