= FS Class 400 =

Steam locomotive

FS Class 400 SFAI 1281-1300 (old) SFAI 1201-1220 (new) RM 4001-4020
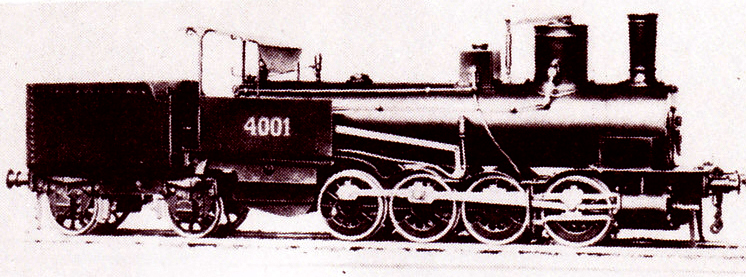
- Locomotive RM 4001
Type and origin
- Power type: Steam
- Builder: Koechlin
- Build date: 1861-1871
- Total produced: 20
Specifications
- Configuration
  - Whyte: 0-8-0
- Gauge: 1,435 mm (4 ft 8 1/2 in)
- Driver dia.: 1.21 m (48 in)
- Length: First series: 14.447 m (47.40 ft) (including tender); Second series: 13.728 m (45.04 ft) (including tender)
- Fuel type: Coal
- Fuel capacity: 3 tonnes (3.0 long tons; 3.3 short tons)
- Water cap.: 7,000 L (1,500 imp gal; 1,800 US gal)
- Boiler pressure: 8 bar (0.80 MPa; 120 psi)
- Cylinders: 2 outside
- Cylinder size: 560 mm × 610 mm (22 in × 24 in)
- Valve gear: Stephenson
Performance figures
- Maximum speed: 40 km/h (25 mph)
- Power output: First series: 590 hp (440 kW); Second series: 610 hp (450 kW)
- Tractive effort: 7,140 kgf (15,700 lbf)

FS Class 400 were steam locomotives of French construction, built for service in Italy. They were 0-8-0 tender locomotives with two outside cylinders.

== History ==
During the second half of 1860 the progress of the construction of the Porrettana railway highlighted the need to order locomotives suitable for the demanding Apennine route, so a construction order was issued for a group of 10 units to the prestigious Koechlin locomotive factory in Mulhouse. For a mountain route, the locomotives had a 0-8-0 wheel arrangement for maximum adhesion. This was the first use of eight-coupled locomotives on Italian railways. The locomotives were delivered between 1861 and 1866 and entered service on the Porrettana railway. A second batch of 10 was ordered in 1871.

== Ownership ==
1. LVCI
2. Società anonima delle strade ferrate della Lombardia e dell'Italia Centrale
3. Società per le strade ferrate dell'Alta Italia (SFAI)
4. Rete Mediterranea (RM)
5. Italian State Railways (FS)

== Numbering ==
Deliveries took place gradually, beginning in 1861. Owing to company changes, the early numbering is complex but, under the Società per le strade ferrate dell'Alta Italia (SFAI), they became 1281-1290. To cope with an increase in traffic, the company ordered a further batch of 10 locomotives, very similar but more powerful, from the Koechlin factory in 1871. These were assigned to the Frejus line and numbered 1291-1300. Later re-numberings and names are shown in the table below. Several locomotives were scrapped following accident damage but 14 units survived and passed to the Italian State Railways (FS) in 1905. The locomotives were of sturdy construction, characteristic of those designed by Edouard Beugniot, but were very rudimentary. After a few years' service with the FS they were relegated to banking heavy trains on the old Giovi line. They were withdrawn from service in 1909 and had been scrapped by 1910.

Old SFAI number	New SFAI number	RM number	Name	FS number	Notes
1281	1201	4001	Mammuth	not received	withdrawn before 1905
1282	1202	4002	Mastodonte	4002	
1283	1203	4003	Elefante	in range 4001-4004	
1284	1204	4004	Montebello	not received	withdrawn by RM in 1902
1285	1205	4005	Pegaso	not received	withdrawn before 1905
1286	1206	4006	Rabicano	in range 4001-4004	
1287	1207	4007	Ippogrifo	in range 4001-4004	
1288	1208	4008	Grifone	in range 4001-4004	
1289	1209	not received	?	not received	withdrawn before 1905
1290	1210	not received	?	not received	withdrawn before 1905
1291	1211	4011	Ciclope	4005	
1292	1212	4012	Fetonte	4006	
1293	1213	4013	Tifeo	4007	
1294	1214	4014	Polifemo	4008	
1295	1215	4015	Anteo	4009	
1296	1216	4016	Gerione	4010	
1297	1217	4017	Bronteo	4011	
1298	1218	not received	?	not received	withdrawn before 1905
1299	1219	4019	Encedalo	4012	
1300	1220	4020	Briareo	4013	

== Features ==
The locomotives had a 0-8-0 wheel arrangement. They were not mass-produced and there were some detail differences between units. There was a wide firebox located behind the driving wheels and, to keep the axle load down to 12.5 tonnes (12.3 long tons; 13.8 short tons), a part of the weight was carried by the tender. The boiler supplied saturated steam at a maximum pressure of 8 bar (0.80 MPa; 120 psi) and the engine had two outside cylinders. The continuous power output of the first series of machines was 590 hp (440 kW). The locomotives were not equipped with pneumatic brakes but only a steam brake on the engine and a handbrake on the tender. The footplate was cramped and covered by a simple canopy. It was modified under RM ownership by closing it in to offer a better shelter for the crew. The tenders varied, some having two axles and others having three axles. In later years, the tenders were modified so that they no longer carried part of the locomotive weight. As was usual at that time, the locomotives were baptized and each received its own name. Seven units were involved in serious accidents and six were written off. The seventh was inherited by the FS in a wrecked condition.

=== First series ===
An obvious feature of the 10 locomotives of the first series was the three-axle tender, on which part of the locomotive weight was carried. The continuous power output was 590 hp (440 kW). The sandbox was placed adjacent to the steam dome and the supply pipe delivered sand ahead of the second axle. The safety valve was located on a small dome on top of the firebox.

=== Second series ===
The second series of 10 machines was modified by adopting a two-axle tender. The length of the firebox was increased to make it more capacious and the continuous power output rose to 610 hp (450 kW). The sandbox was moved near to the centre of the boiler and delivered sand ahead of the third axle. The safety valve was located on the steam dome, just behind the chimney.

== Allocations ==
- Florence locomotive depot
- Genova Rivarolo locomotive depot
