= Mastodonte dei Giovi (locomotive) =

SFSP 39-50, 76-79, 90-93 from 1865 SFAI 1051-1070 from 1869 SFAI 1401-1420 from 1885 RM 5201-5204 from 1905 FS 8231-8232 from 1907 FS 8151-8152
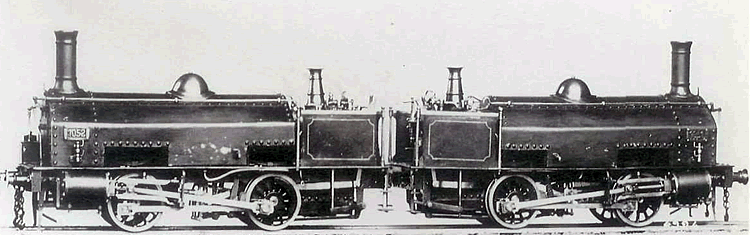
- Locomotives "Mastodonte dei Giovi", date: circa 1860
Type and origin
- Power type: Steam
- Builder: Robert Stephenson and Company; John Cockerill and Company
- Build date: 1853-1855
- Total produced: 10 pairs
Specifications
- Configuration
  - Whyte: 0-4-0+0-4-0ST
  - UIC: B′B′ n4t
- Gauge: 1,435 mm (4 ft 8 1/2 in)
- Driver dia.: 1,070 mm (3 ft 6 1/8 in)
- Loco weight: 56 tonnes (55 long tons; 62 short tons)
- Fuel type: Coal
- Boiler pressure: 7.0 kgf/cm^{2} (6.86 bar; 99.6 psi)
- Cylinders: Four, outside
- Cylinder size: 355 mm × 558 mm (14 in × 21 15/16 in)
- Valve gear: Stephenson
Performance figures
- Maximum speed: 35 km/h (22 mph)
- Power output: 382 hp (285 kW)

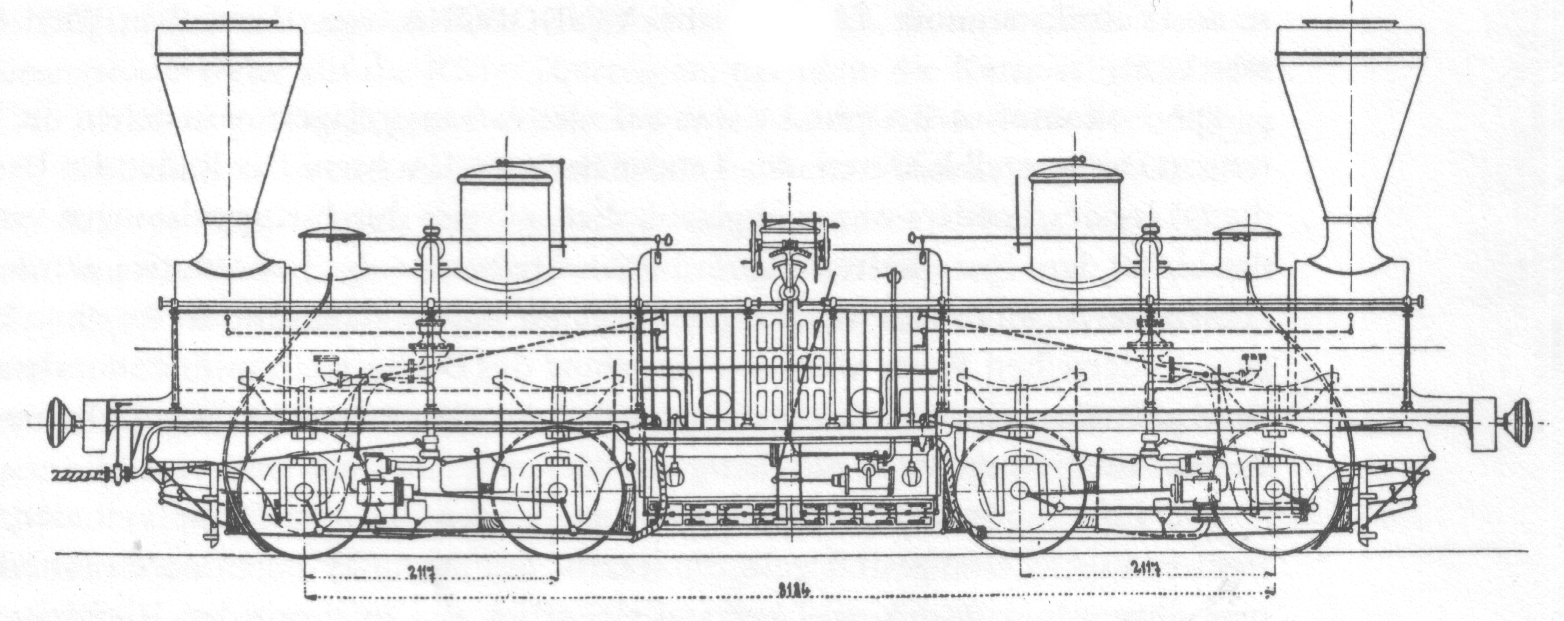
Cockerill's Semmering locomotive from which the Mastodon project of the Giovi took inspiration

The Mastodonte dei Giovi was a special double steam locomotive built specifically for use on the difficult Apennine stretch of the new Turin - Genoa railway line, inaugurated in 1853.

== History ==
The construction of the Giovi Railway, which was intended to be the backbone of the Piedmontese railway system connecting Turin to the port city of Genoa, posed the serious problem of how to cross the Giovi Pass with its steep inclines. Initially it was planned to use a rope system with hydraulic motors. However, an international competition announced by the Semmering railway of Austria had brought other solutions more suitable to increase the uphill haulage capacity of the locomotives of the time.

The Cockerill workshops had studied a solution that met with particular favour. It was a double-boiler locomotive, similar to a Double Fairlie. It had a central firebox on a single long frame, and required a driver and two firemen. This solution impressed the brilliant Italian engineer Germain Sommeiller but he considered it would be difficult to negotiate the sharp curves of the Giovi given the long rigid frame. He then studied an ingenious solution. His machine was composed of two 0-4-0 locomotives coupled back-to-back. The coupling was semi-permanent but was detachable if necessary in case of breakdown or for maintenance. A jointed platform allowed operation with only one driver and one stoker.

The locomotive units were well-proven two-axle machines of Stephenson design. Ten pairs were built between 1853 and 1855; five by Stephenson in England and five by John Cockerill and Company in Seraing, Belgium. A pair of locomotives delivered 382 horsepower (285 kW) and could haul a train of 130 tonnes (130 long tons; 140 short tons) at 12 kilometres per hour (7.5 mph) on a 3.6% gradient. The name "Mastodonti dei Giovi" was borrowed from that of a large fossil found during the excavation of the tunnel near Busalla. The locomotives served until the mid 1870s, when they were replaced by Beugniot locomotives with 4 coupled axles. The locomotives went through several changes of ownership and details are shown in the list below.

== Rebuilds ==
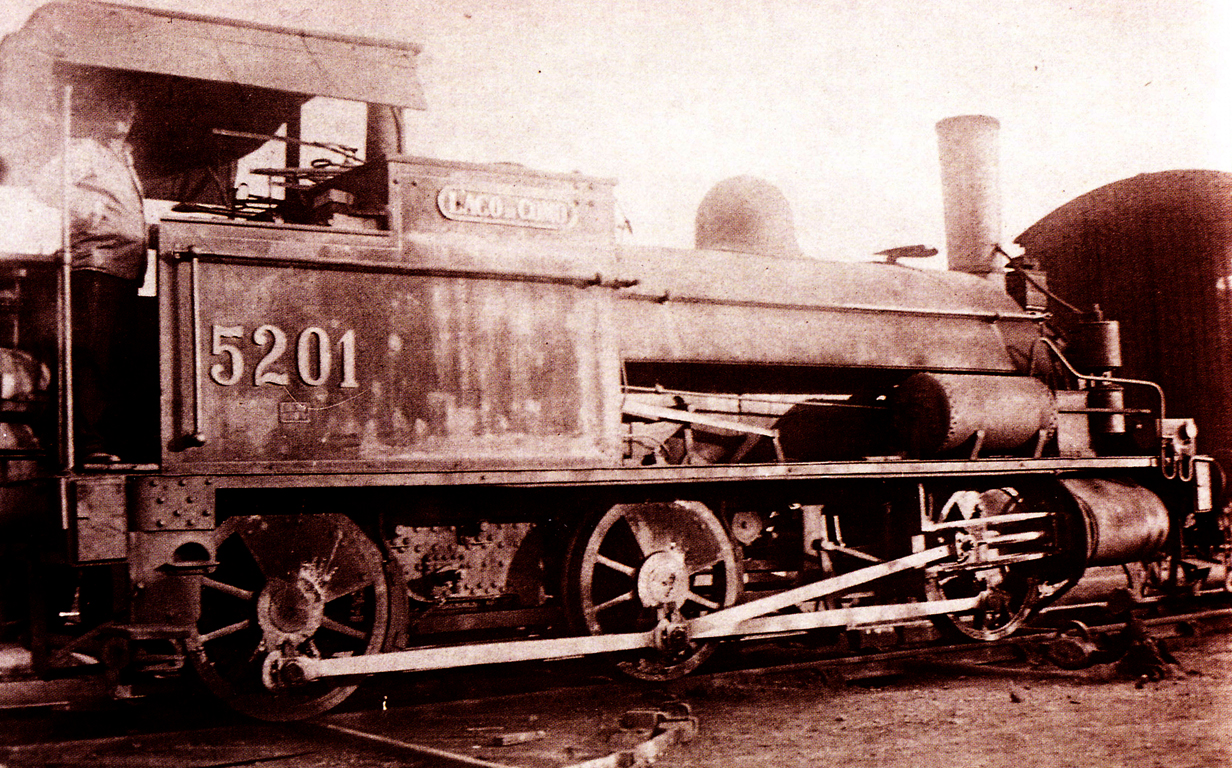
Locomotive 5201 "Lago di Como" of the Rete Mediterranea, later FS 8151

Following their replacement with more modern machines, the SFAI, between 1870 and 1871, studied their re-use:. Two double units, 76 + 77 and 78 + 79 were divided and rebuilt at the Officine Nuove di Torino as separate tank locomotives. A new longer boiler was fitted and the frame was lengthened by adding a third coupled axle. The "new" locomotives became SFAI 1408-1411. In 1874 four units that had taken the numbers SFAI 1404-1407 were separated and coupled to three-axle tenders. In 1885, following the "Conventions" which assigned the stock of the SFAI to the Rete Mediterranea (RM), SFAI 1408-1411 were renumbered RM 5201-5204. In 1905, only two of these four passed to the Ferrovie dello Stato, nos. 5201 and 5203, and they were re-registered as FS 8231 and 8232 (FS Class 823). In 1907, they were renumbered FS 8151 and 8152 (FS Class 815). They were scrapped between 1911 and 1912 and none has been preserved.

== Numbering ==
SFSP number	Builder	Build date	SFAI number (1865)	SFAI number (1869)	RM number	FS number	Date scrapped
39	-	1853	1051	-	-	-	1872÷1875
40	-	1853	1052	-	-	-	1872÷1875
41	-	1853	1053	-	-	-	1872÷1875
42	-	1853	1054	-	-	-	1872÷1875
43	-	1853	1055	-	-	-	1872÷1875
44	-	1853	1056	-	-	-	1872÷1875
45	-	1853	1057	-	-	-	1872÷1875
46	-	1853	1058	-	-	-	1872÷1875
47	-	1853	1059	-	-	-	1872÷1875
48	-	1853	1060	-	-	-	1872÷1875
49	-	1853	1061	-	-	-	1872÷1875
50	-	1853	1062	-	-	-	1872÷1875
76	-	1854	1063	1408	5201 "Lago di Como"	8231/8151	1911÷1912
77	-	1854	1064	1409	5202	-	?
78	-	1854	1065	1410	5203 "Lago di Iseo"	8232/8152	1911÷1912
79	-	1854	1066	1411	5204	-	?
90	-	1855	1067	1404	5102	-	?
91	-	1855	1068	1405	5103	8002	?
92	-	1855	1069	1406	5104	-	?
93	-	1855	1070	1407	5105	-	?

== Glossary ==
- SFSP = Strade Ferrate dello Stato Piemontese
- SFAI = Società per le strade ferrate dell'Alta Italia
- RM = Rete Mediterranea
- FS = Ferrovie dello Stato
