= Locomotives LVCI 79-90 =

LVCI 79-90
Type and origin
- Power type: Steam
- Builder: Koechlin
- Build date: 1858
- Total produced: 12
Specifications
- Configuration
  - Whyte: 2-4-0
- Gauge: 1,435 mm (4 ft 8 1/2 in)
- Driver dia.: 1.5 metres
- Length: 8.402 metres
- Loco weight: 29.3 tonnes
- Fuel type: Coal
- Boiler pressure: 7 atmospheres, c. 100 psi
- Heating surface: 120.2 m^{2}
- Cylinders: 2
- Cylinder size: 420 x 610 mm

LVCI 79-90 were a group of 2-4-0 steam locomotives of the LVCI, a private company of Austria-Hungary. The 12 Locomotives were supplied by Koechlin in 1858. They were very similar to LCVI 51–60.

== Names ==
The locomotives were named: Paisiello, Ariosto, Tasso, Petrarca, Raffaello, Michelangelo, Giotto, Cimabue, Bramante, Torricelli, Oriani, Cavalli.

== Ownership changes ==
The Südbahn took 10 of these 12 Locomotives, calling them Group SB 5. The "Ariosto" and "Raffaello" remained with the LVCI. They later became SFAI 381–382, RM 2019-2020 and FS 1181–1182.
