= FS Class 650 =

SFAI 1181-1200 RM Class 3000 FS Class 650
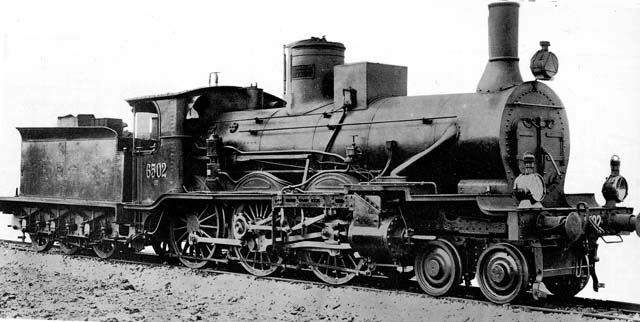
- FS locomotive 6502, later 650.002
Type and origin
- Power type: Steam
- Builder: SFAI Turin works (1), Gio. Ansaldo & C. (36), Maffei (13), Officine Miani & Silvestri (5)
- Build date: 1884–1896
- Total produced: 55
Specifications
- Configuration
  - Whyte: 4-6-0
  - UIC: 2′C n2
- Gauge: 1,435 mm (4 ft 8 1/2 in)
- Leading dia.: 840 mm (33.07 in)
- Driver dia.: 1,675 mm (65.94 in)
- Length: 10,280 mm (33 ft 8 3/4 in)
- Axle load: 14.2 tonnes (14.0 long tons; 15.7 short tons)
- Loco weight: 54.1 tonnes (53.2 long tons; 59.6 short tons)
- Tender weight: 29.9 tonnes (29.4 long tons; 33.0 short tons)
- Fuel type: Coal
- Fuel capacity: 3,500 kg (7,700 lb)
- Water cap.: 10,000 litres (2,200 imp gal; 2,600 US gal)
- Firebox
  - Grate area: 2.34 m^{2} (25.2 sq ft)
- Boiler pressure: 10 kg/cm^{2} (981 kPa; 142 psi)
- Heating surface: 125.4 m^{2} (1,350 sq ft)
- Cylinders: Two, outside
- Cylinder size: 475 mm × 620 mm (18.70 in × 24.41 in)
- Valve gear: Gooch
Performance figures
- Maximum speed: 80 km/h (50 mph)
- Power output: 630 CV (463 kW; 621 hp)
- Tractive effort: 6,250 kgf (61.3 kN; 13,800 lbf)

The Ferrovie dello Stato Italiane (FS; Italian State Railways) Class 650 (Italian: Gruppo 650), formerly SFAI 1181-1200 and Rete Mediterranea 300 Class, also known as "Vittorio Emanuele II", was the first steam locomotive in continental Europe to have the 4-6-0 'Ten-Wheeler' arrangement.

== Design and construction ==
Designed by Cesare Frescot, the Class 650 was designed in light of the forthcoming opening (in 1889) of the new relief Giovi railway, which supplemented the old line opened in the 1850s and was less steep (1.6% maximum instead of 3.5%).

Previous fast locomotives were of the 4-4-0 arrangement; Frescot decided to add one more driving axle to ensure that the locomotive would be able to pull the increased loads without exceeding the axle load limits. He also discarded the Belpaire firebox, common in SFAI locomotive practice, for a round-top firebox, which would be a mainstay of Italian locomotive practice. The first locomotives had a working boiler pressure of 10 kilograms per square centimetre (981 kPa; 142 psi), while subsequent locomotives enjoyed a greater pressure of 11 kilograms per square centimetre (1,080 kPa; 156 psi); three locomotives were also fitted a longer boiler with a combustion chamber. The bogie had a small wheelbase, to keep the locomotive as short as possible.

The first locomotive was built in the SFAI's Turin works in 1884; the other fifty-four locomotives were built from 1887 to 1896: 36 by Ansaldo, thirteen by Maffei and five by Officine Miani & Silvestri.

== Service and modifications ==
The first locomotive was the only one given a running number by the Società per le strade ferrate dell'Alta Italia, and was also the only one given a name ("Vittorio Emanuele II", in honour of King Victor Emmanuel II of Italy), as just as it was completed the transition between the SFAI and the Rete Mediterranea was being executed.

The Class 650 proved very successful, being able to pull 130 tons over the new Giovi railway at a speed of 45 kilometres per hour (28 mph). However, the steady increasing of the train's weight meant that these locomotives were gradually replaced by more powerful ones. The last locomotives of the Class 650 were withdrawn in the 1920s, with none surviving into preservation.

Some units of the class were rebuilt under the FS period with the boiler of the FS Class 656.
