= Società anonima delle strade ferrate della Lombardia e dell'Italia Centrale =

Defunct Italian railway company

The Società anonima delle strade ferrate della Lombardia e dell'Italia Centrale was a joint-stock Anglo-French-Italian private company formed, following the partition of the territory, and the railways built in it, under construction or planned, resulting from the defeat of Austria in the Second Italian War of Independence, following the convention of 25 June 1860 among the Ministers of King Vittorio Emanuele II for Public Works and Finance and the previous Imperial-regia società privilegiata delle strade ferrate lombardo-venete e dell'Italia Centrale.

== History ==
The complicated process leading to the birth of the company has its roots in the decade of 1850-1860. The agreement between the Ministers of Public Works and Finance of the Kingdom of Italy (newly established) on 25 June 1860 and approved by the Parliament of the Kingdom, consisting of the Senate and the Chamber of Deputies on July 8, ratified, with the appropriate changes in the composition of the share capital, guarantees and representatives, the previous agreement that the previous imperial-privileged company had signed with the Austrian government on 14 March 1856 and with the Duchy of Parma, Duchy of Modena and Reggio, Grand Duchy of Tuscany and the Papal States three days later, on 17 March. The Second Italian War of Independence led to the splitting of the Lombardo-Veneto railway network and the complex economic interweaving of the construction and operation of the railways.

=== The convention ===
The construction of railways by the State became blocked in 1854, owing to the lack of available funds. A new law for concessions began the era of private railways. Much infrastructure was completed by private companies whose economic consistency was essentially based on Rothschild capital of the Viennese house, with not always quantifiable holdings of homologous Parisian and London houses. On 14 March 1856, a Convention concerning the recruitment, construction and operation of the railways in the Lombard-Veneto Kingdom was signed between the Imperial-Registers Ministers of Finance and Commerce of Austria and a consortium of financiers and bankers, including Rothschild of the Viennese, Parisian and English houses, Paulin Talabot and other Frenchmen, Pietro Bastogi, the Duke of Galliera and other Italian financiers.

The convention provided for in Article 1 that the State gives to the said lords the Railway tracks of the State located in the Lombardy-Venetia Kingdom with all their appurtenances, movable and immovable, excepting only that trunk which, starting from Verona, enters towards the Southern Title, in order to exercise and use them for the duration of 90 years. Article 43 allowed the bankers consortium to establish a company with residence in Vienna and to issue shares. The document provided for the obligation to complete the construction works on the sections not yet completed. With the agreement, the company:

- Acquired the Coccaglio-Venezia, Milano-Treviglio, Bergamo-Coccaglio, Milan-Como, Verona-Mantua and Mestre-Casarsa lines.
- Undertook to build the Bergamo-Monza, Lecco-Bergamo, Milan-Boffalora, Milan-Piacenza, Milan-Sesto Calende, Mantova-Borgoforte and Casarsa-Udine-Nabresina lines.
- Was given running powers over the line between Nabresina and Trieste belonging to the Austrian Southern Railway (still under construction).

On 17 March 1856, the Convention between Austria, the Papal States, the Grand Duchy of Tuscany, the Duchy of Parma and Duchy of Modena and Reggio was signed, granting the Marquis Raffaele de Ferrari, Duke of Galliera, the concession for the construction of the "Italian Central Railway" consisting of Piacenza-Parma-Reggio and Mantova-Reggio-Bologna-Pistoia and Prato. The guarantee of a minimum annual total interest of 6,500,000 lire was also granted, due to the very serious difficulties in carrying out the work. The company adopted the name of Imperial-regia società privilegiata delle strade ferrate lombardo-venete e dell'Italia Centrale as a result of this assignment.

On May 24 of the same year, the concession already granted (16 June 1851) to the Società Anonima per la Strada Ferrata dell'Italia Centrale regarding Pistoia-Bologna (and passed to the new company) was officially revoked.

The banking groups consortium obtained further concessions, such as Vienna-Trieste and Innsbruck-Verona. On 1 January 1859 the fusion between the Lombard-Venetian and Central Italy companies and the Eastern railway company (KKP Kaiser Franz Joseph-Orientbahngesellschaft) was constituted as the Kaiserliche königliche privilegierte südliche Staats, Lombardisch-venezianische und Zentral-italienische Eisenbahngesellschaft with registered office in Vienna.

After defeat in the war, and the loss of Lombardy, the Austrian government entrusted all the lines built or under construction in the territory remaining in its possession to the Südbahn (which was also majority-owned by Rothschild), subtracting them from the competence of Lombardy-Veneto (in which there was significant French and Italian capital).

=== The old company comes back to life in the Kingdom of Italy ===
The defeat of Austria in the second war of independence risked compromising the project and related investments. With the border moved from the Ticino to the Mincio, the future of the project was in doubt. Mediation was undertaken to arrive at a new convention with the Italian State. Paulin Talabot was the representative of the Rothschild bankers. The maneuvers of the Leghorn banking groups, headed by Pietro Bastogi, were no less important. Other subjects were also interested, including Bartolomeo Cini, the first financier of Porrettana, and the Duke of Galliera. The resolution taken by the Italian government was to free the company from previous obligations and any form of dependence on Vienna, reconstituting it with a new concession. This was based on the previous one, gave new rules by which the company had to abide, and listed the railway lines that would be entrusted to it. As for central Italy, the company became a concessionaire for the construction and operation of Piacenza-Bologna and the line for Pistoia. It lost the concession of Reggio-Borgoforte but, in exchange, it obtained the one for the Bologna-Ferrara-Pontelagoscuro line, including the bridge over the Po. In 1861 the company was registered in the official share price list of the Milan Stock Exchange.

=== The SFAI takeover ===
The following years were difficult and caused numerous disruptions. The law no. 2279 of 14 May 1865 led to the formation of three major railway companies:

- Società per le strade ferrate dell'Alta Italia (Upper Italian Railways, SFAI)
- Società per le Strade Ferrate Romane (Roman Railways, SFR)
- Società per le Strade Ferrate Meridionali (Company for the Southern Railways, SFM)

The SFAI was established on 1 July 1865 with 1,701.9 kilometres (1,057.5 mi) of line it acquired from the state railway of the Kingdom of Sardinia (Piedmont) (729.8 kilometres (453.5 mi)), the part of the state railway of the former Kingdom of Lombardy–Venetia (972 kilometres (604 mi)) and some private railways, including the Victor Emmanuel Railway, and some of the Südbahn. All this constituted the network of Upper Italy and was added to what was already owned by the Lombard-central company up to Florence. Thus was born the Società per le strade ferrate dell'Alta Italia (SFAI) whose members and financiers were practically the same as the previous company - a simple takeover with the acquisition of some additional lines. Into the coffers of the Kingdom came 188.42 million lire for the transfer of rolling stock and railway tracks to the newly established Società per le strade ferrate dell'Alta Italia. In return, it was given a 95-year concession. The Government also guaranteed the Company a gross product of 28 million lire for the entire network.

On 1 July 1885 the SFAI network was taken over by the Rete Mediterranea (Mediterranean Network) and the Rete Adriatica (Adriatic Network), with lines generally west of Milan going to the Rete Mediterranea.
