= Locomotives LVCI 116-119 =

LVCI 116-119 from 1865 SFAI 714-717 from 1869 SFAI 778-781 from 1885 RM 3948-3951 from 1905 FS Class 397
Type and origin
- Power type: Steam
- Builder: Parent & Schaken
- Build date: 1859
- Total produced: 4
Specifications
- Configuration
  - Whyte: 0-6-0
- Gauge: 1,435 mm (4 ft 8 1/2 in)
- Driver dia.: 1.515 m (59.6 in)
- Length: 14.688 m (48.2 ft)
- Loco weight: 30.2 tonnes (29.7 long tons; 33.3 short tons)
- Fuel type: Coal
- Boiler pressure: 8 kgf/cm^{2} (0.78 MPa; 110 psi)
- Cylinders: 2 inside
- Valve gear: Stephenson
Performance figures
- Maximum speed: 50 km/h (31 mph)
- Power output: 260 CV (190 kW; 260 hp)

Locomotives LVCI 116-119 were 0-6-0 steam locomotives of the LVCI. They were designed for hauling passenger trains.

== History ==
They were built in 1859 by Parent & Schaken, which later became Fives-Lille, for the French army, and sent to Italy for the Second Italian War of Independence. At the end of the conflict, they had been incorporated into the stock of the LVCI, a company linked to the French arm of the Rothschild Group. In 1865, the locomotives passed to the Società per le strade ferrate dell'Alta Italia (SFAI), which assigned them the numbers 714-717. Later (probably in 1869), they were renumbered 778-781. In 1885, the locomotives passed to the Rete Mediterranea at the creation of the great national networks numbered 3948-3951. In 1905, at the time of nationalization, only 3 units arrived at the FS, registering them as Class 397 with numbers 3971-3973. They were regarded as obsolete, so they were soon withdrawn and scrapped.
