= 400 class =

400 class or Class 400 may refer to:

- FS Class 400, 0-8-0 steam locomotives
- GS&WR Class 400, 4-6-0 steam locomotives
- New South Wales 400/500 class railmotor
- NS Class 400, diesel locomotives
- South Australian Railways 400 class, 4-8-2+2-8-4 steam locomotives
- South Australian Railways Redhen railcar#400 class double-ended power cars
