= Locomotive SFAI 1400 =

SFAI 1400 from 1885 RM 5101 from 1905 FS Class 800
Type and origin
- Power type: Steam
- Builder: Cockerill
- Build date: 1870
- Total produced: 1
Specifications
- Configuration
  - Whyte: 0-4-0T
- Gauge: 1,435 mm (4 ft 8 1/2 in)
- Driver dia.: 1.06 m (42 in)
- Length: 7.185 m (23.57 ft)
- Loco weight: 24 tonnes (24 long tons; 26 short tons)
- Fuel type: Coal
- Fuel capacity: 1.5 tonnes (1.5 long tons; 1.7 short tons)
- Water cap.: 4,000 L (880 imp gal; 1,100 US gal)
- Boiler pressure: 6 kgf/cm^{2} (0.59 MPa; 85 psi)
- Cylinders: 2 outside
- Valve gear: Stephenson
Performance figures
- Maximum speed: 35 km/h (22 mph)
- Power output: 190 CV (140 kW; 190 hp)

Locomotive SFAI 1400 was a small 0-4-0 tank locomotive built in 1870 for the Società per le strade ferrate dell'Alta Italia (SFAI) by Cockerill of Seraing.

== History ==
It was originally used by the construction company of the Fréjus Rail Tunnel for the haulage of works trains. On completion of the work in 1871, it passed to the SFAI, which numbered it 1400. In 1885, when the great national networks were created, the locomotive passed to the Rete Mediterranea, where it took the number 5101. In 1905, on the nationalization of the railways, it entered the stock of the Ferrovie dello Stato (FS), which placed it in Class 800 with the number 8001. The other engine in the class, 8002, was completely different, being a more powerful engine with a separate tender.
