= FS Class 396 =

VE 37-42 from 1865 SFAI 703-708 from 1869 SFAI 767-772 from 1885 RM 3942-3947 from 1905 FS Class 396
Type and origin
- Power type: Steam
- Builder: Cail
- Build date: 1860
- Total produced: 6
Specifications
- Configuration
  - Whyte: 0-6-0
- Gauge: 1,435 mm (4 ft 8 1/2 in)
- Driver dia.: 1.49 m (59 in)
- Length: 13.4 m (44 ft)
- Loco weight: 30 tonnes (30 long tons; 33 short tons)
- Fuel type: Coal
- Boiler pressure: 7 bar (0.70 MPa; 100 psi)
- Cylinders: 2 inside
- Valve gear: Stephenson
Performance figures
- Maximum speed: 50 km/h (31 mph)

FS Class 396 was a class of 0-6-0 steam locomotives originally built for the Victor Emmanuel Railway (VE). They were designed for hauling passenger trains and were nicknamed "Mammoth".

== History ==
VE ordered six locomotives from the Cail rolling stock factory and they were delivered in 1860. They were numbered 37-42. In 1865 the locomotives passed to the Società per le strade ferrate dell'Alta Italia (SFAI), which renumbered them 703-708, and later (probably in 1869) 767-772. In 1885, at the creation of the great national networks, the locomotives passed to the Rete Mediterranea (RM) and took the numbers 3942-3947. In 1905, at the time of nationalization, only five units arrived at the FS, which registered them as Class 396 with numbers from 3961-3965. They remained in service until 1911. By then, they were obsolete and they were scrapped in 1912.

== Technical details ==
The locomotives were of simple design. The boiler pressure was 7 bars (0.70 MPa; 100 psi) and they had two inside cylinders and Stephenson valve gear.
