= SFAI =

SFAI may refer to:

- San Francisco Art Institute
- Società per le strade ferrate dell'Alta Italia, Upper Italian Railways
