= FS Class 310 =

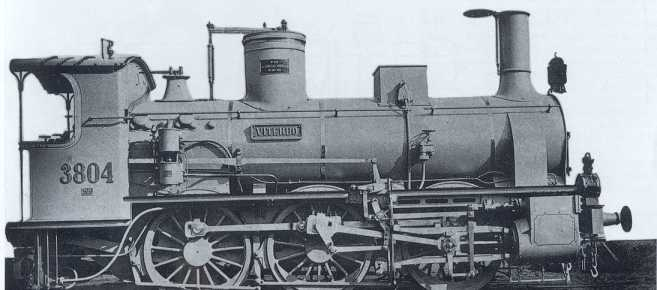
Type and origin
- Power type: Steam
- Builder: Ernesto Breda (49), MÁVAG (20)
- Build date: 1894–1901
- Total produced: 69
Specifications
- Configuration
  - UIC: C n2v
- Gauge: 1,435 mm (4 ft 8 1/2 in) standard gauge
- Driver dia.: 1,500 mm (59.06 in)
- Length: 8,723 mm (28 ft 7 3/8 in)
- Axle load: 14.5 tonnes (14.3 long tons; 16.0 short tons)
- Loco weight: 43.5 tonnes (42.8 long tons; 48.0 short tons)
- Tender weight: 33 tonnes (32 long tons; 36 short tons)
- Fuel type: Coal
- Fuel capacity: 4,000 kg (8,800 lb)
- Water cap.: 12,000 litres (2,600 imp gal; 3,200 US gal)
- Firebox
  - Grate area: 1.8 m^{2} (19 sq ft)
- Boiler pressure: 12 kg/cm^{2} (1.18 MPa; 171 psi)
- Heating surface: 143.2 m^{2} (1,541 sq ft)
- Cylinders: Two, compound
- High-pressure cylinder: 460 mm × 640 mm (18.11 in × 25.20 in)
- Low-pressure cylinder: 650 mm × 640 mm (25.59 in × 25.20 in)
- Valve gear: Walschaerts
Performance figures
- Maximum speed: 60 km/h (37 mph)
- Power output: 500 CV (368 kW; 493 hp) at 30 km/h (19 mph)
- Tractive effort: 6,620 kgf (64.9 kN; 14,600 lbf)

The Ferrovie dello Stato Italiane (FS; Italian State Railways) Class 310 (Italian: Gruppo 310), formerly Rete Mediterranea Class 380, was a 0-6-0 steam locomotive; they were the first Italian as-built compound locomotives.

== Design and construction ==
After modifying six of the pre-existing Class 255 to a compound arrangement as an experiment, with positive results, the Ufficio d'Arte di Torino of the Rete Mediterranea designed a two-cylinder compound locomotive meant for mixed service; this design also saw the beginning of the adoption of the Walschaerts valve gear on Italian locomotives.

The round-topped boiler on the first 49 units had standard tubes; however, on the last 20 units it was replaced by one with Serve tubes, which brought the power of these locomotives from the original 430 CV (316 kW; 424 hp) to 500 CV (368 kW; 493 hp).

These locomotives were built between 1894 and 1901 by Ernesto Breda and MÁVAG.

== Service ==
The Class 310, while an important step in Italian locomotive design, was not a thoroughly successful design; the unique cut-off command for both cylinders made it difficult to equalize the work being done, the starting valve design did not prove entirely successful, and the proportions of the cylinders were also less than optimal. The need to obviate these inconvenients led to the development of the more successful Class 320.

The Class 310 locomotives served on both passenger and freight trains on secondary lines for their whole career; the last units survived till the early 1930s around Asti, but were withdrawn soon after. No locomotive survived into preservation.
