= Beugniot lever =

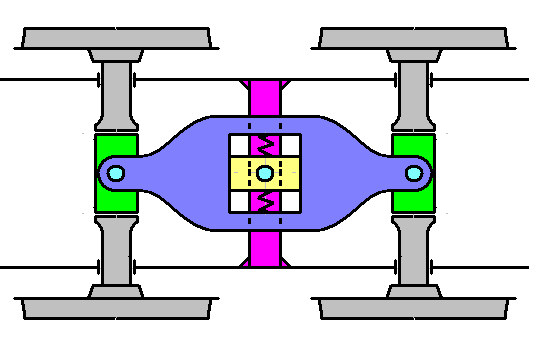
Diagram of Beugniot lever

The Beugniot lever (Beugniot-Hebel) is a mechanical device used on a number of locomotives to improve curve running. It was named after its inventor Édouard Beugniot.

== Overview ==
Around 1860, when Beugniot was the chief engineer at the firm of André Koechlin & Cie. in Mulhouse, he developed a system whereby wheelsets are housed in pairs in the locomotive frame, with side-play, and connected by a lever. These levers are fixed to the frame in the centre and thus enable the sideways movement of the connected axles in opposite directions. In this way, instead of being fixed in the frame, the axles are able to move sideways rather like a bogie, but clearly nowhere near as much. On locomotives with a side rod drive, the axle side-play is balanced using longer coupling pins (Kuppelzapfen) on which the coupling rods are also able to move sideways.

== Operation ==
On running round a bend, the first axle is pushed sideways by the curve of the rails and so moves the second axle parallel to it in the opposite direction, until the wheel flanges of both axles align with the rails. This distributes the guide forces between the two axles which reduces wear and tear on the wheel flanges. By enabling this transverse movement of the wheelsets, locomotives with rigid frames do not have to use the thinner wheel flanges etc. normally needed to facilitate smooth running through points, bends and tightly curved sections of track. The 'guide length' of the locomotive is formed by the distance between the two fixed Beugniot lever pivot points.

== Examples ==
In Germany, Beugniot levers were used mainly in the middle of the 20th century. The best known examples of locomotives that use this type of lever are the MaK side-rod drive locomotives, the Class 105 and 106 engines in East Germany as well as steam locomotives like the DB Class 82.

== Sources ==
Bedienungs- und Wartungsanleitungen der MaK-Baureihen 600 D, 650 D und 1200 D
