= DR Class V 60 =

Class of East German 0-8-0dh locomotives

DR Class V 60 DR Classes 104, 105, 106 DBAG Classes 344, 345, 346, 347
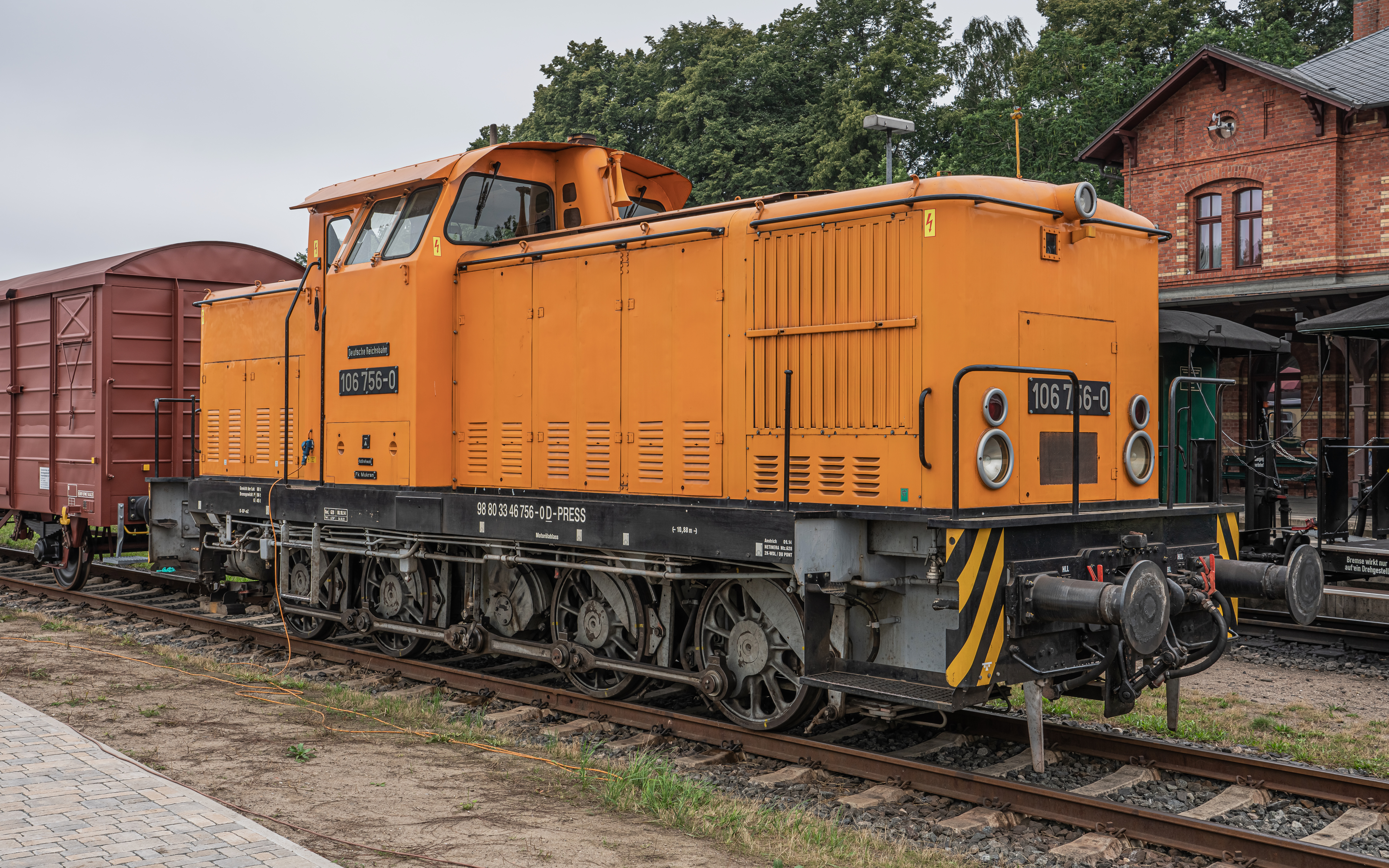
- 106 756-0 at Putbus (Rügen) in August 2022
Type and origin
- Power type: Diesel-hydraulic
- Builder: V 60^{10}: LKM Babelsberg; V 60^{12}: LEW Hennigsdorf
- Build date: Prototype: 1959; V 60^{10}: 1962–1964; V 60^{12}: 1964–1982
- Total produced: 2256 (with industrials)
Specifications
- Configuration
  - Whyte: 0-8-0DH
  - UIC: D dh
- Gauge: 1,435 mm (4 ft 8 1/2 in); 1,520 mm (4 ft 11 27/32 in) (Class 347)
- Wheel diameter: 1,100 mm (3 ft 7 1/4 in)
- Minimum curve: 80 m (260 ft)
- Wheelbase: 5,600 mm (18 ft 4 1/2 in)
- Length
  - Over buffers: 10,880 mm (35 ft 8 3/8 in)
- Height: 4,630 or 4,225 mm (15 ft 2 1/4 in or 13 ft 10 3/8 in)
- Axle load: V 60^{10}: 13.75 t (30,300 lb); V 60^{12}: 15.0 t (33,100 lb)
- Empty weight: V 60^{10}: 55.0 t (121,300 lb); V 60^{12}: 60.0 t (132,300 lb)
- Prime mover: 12 KVD 18/21
- RPM
  - Maximum RPM: 1,500 rpm maximum; 1,100 rpm maximum (Class 344)
- Engine type: 12-cylinder four-stroke diesel
- Safety systems: Sifa
Performance figures
- Maximum speed: Shunting gear: 30 km/h (19 mph); Line-speed (V 60^{10}): 55 km/h (34 mph); Line-speed (V 60^{12}): 60 km/h (37 mph)
- Power output: 650 PS (478 kW; 641 hp); 496 PS (365 kW; 489 hp) (Class 344)
Career
- Numbers: V 60^{10}: V 60 1001–1170; V 60^{12}: V 60 1201–1610; 106 001–170; 106 181–185 (ex-industrials); 106 201–999 105 001–165 105 965..991 (ex-industrials)
- Retired: 1992 onwards

The DR Class V 60 was a class of 0-8-0 diesel-hydraulic locomotives of the Deutsche Reichsbahn intended for medium to heavy shunting service.

In addition to being used by the DR, the locomotives were also found in service on various works and mine railways. About 25 per cent were exported to Comecon countries, and the so-called Non-Socialist Economic Area (Nichtsozialistisches Wirtschaftsgebiet, NSW). For example, the Egyptian State Railways, the Bulgarian State Railways (BDŽ) and Algerian National Railways (SNTF) all received this type of locomotives.

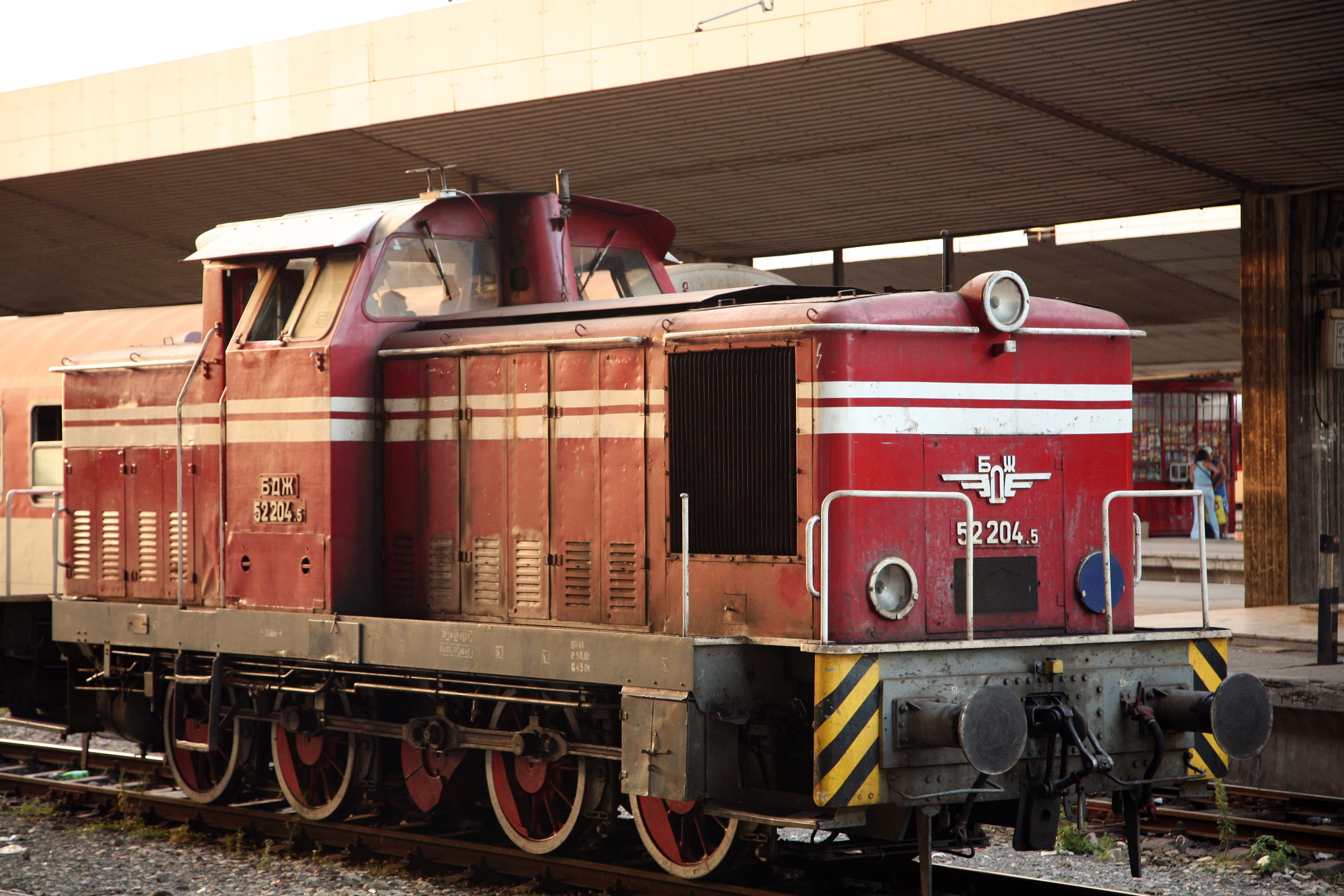
LEW V 60 D of the Bulgarian State Railways (BDŽ 52-204)

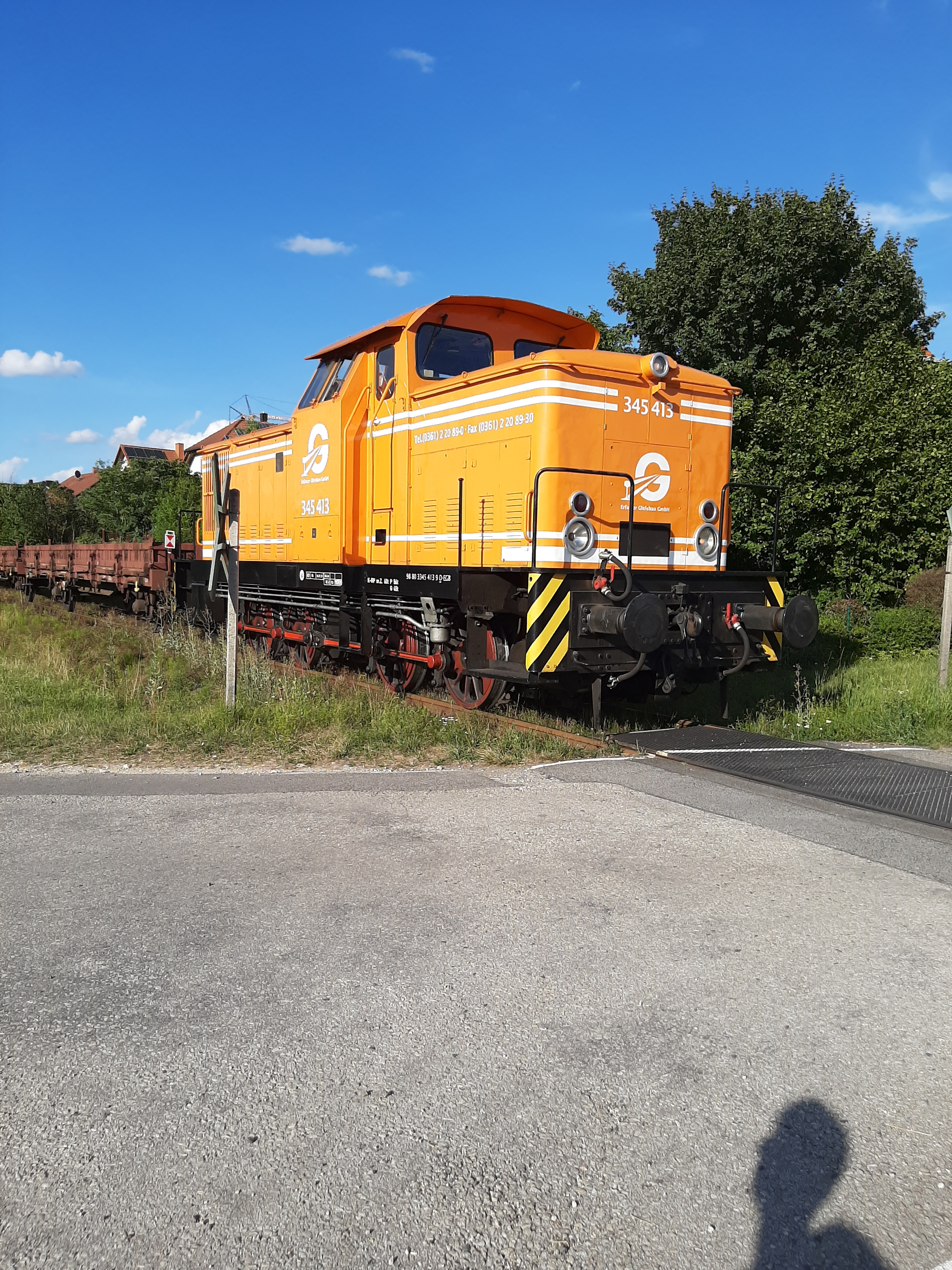
345 413 in track maintenance service in Reckendorf, 2020

== Prototypes ==
Based on the requirements, LKM Babelsberg built a four-axle prototype locomotive with an asymmetrically arranged driver's cab and drive via a jackshaft and coupling rods. A turbocharged eight-cylinder 8 KVD 21 A engine from VEB Motorenwerk Johannisthal was used. The testing of the prototype V 60 1001 began on 5 February 1959. In September 1959, the second prototype V 60 1002 followed.

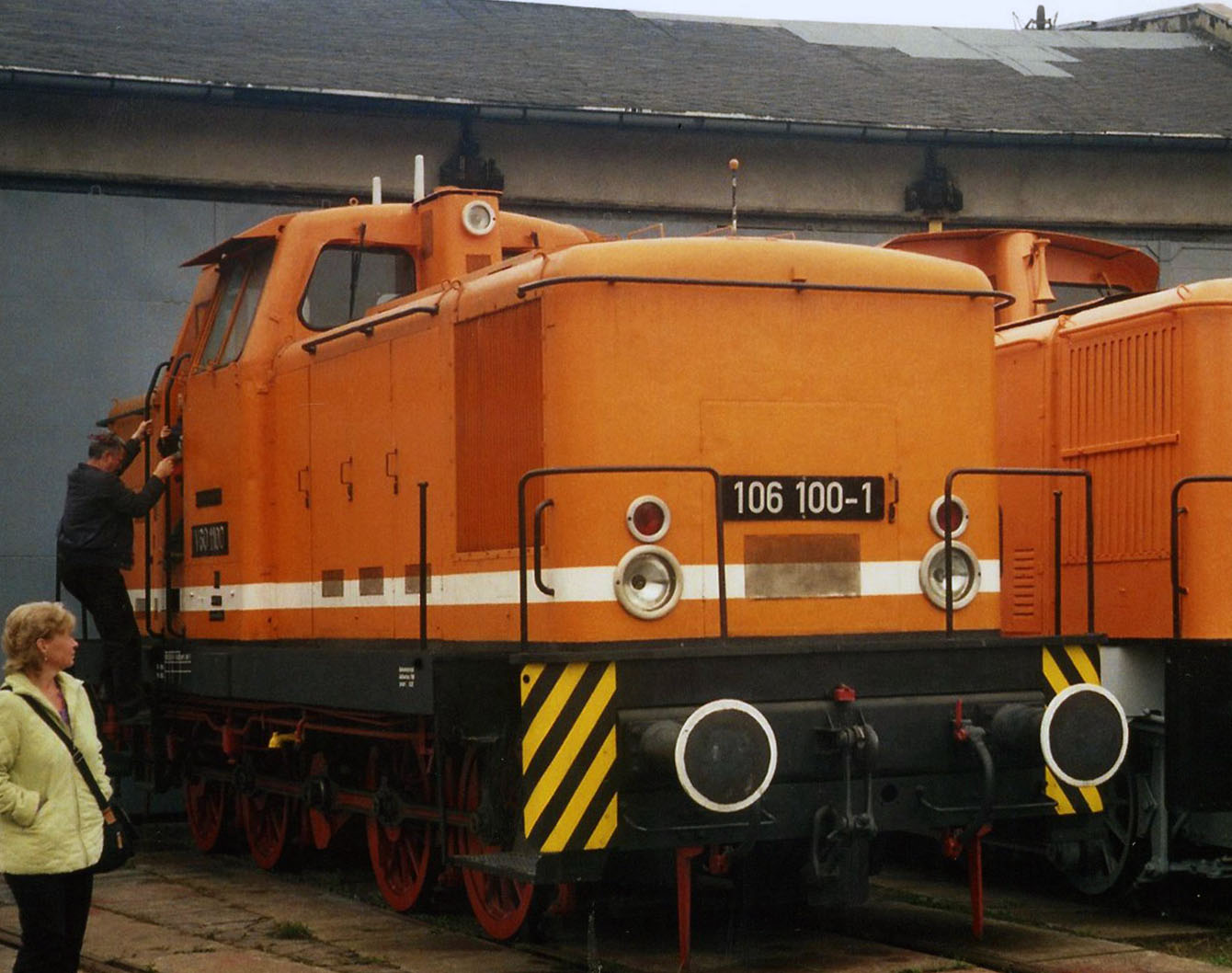
Original V 60 D from Babelsberg without the overhanging roof.

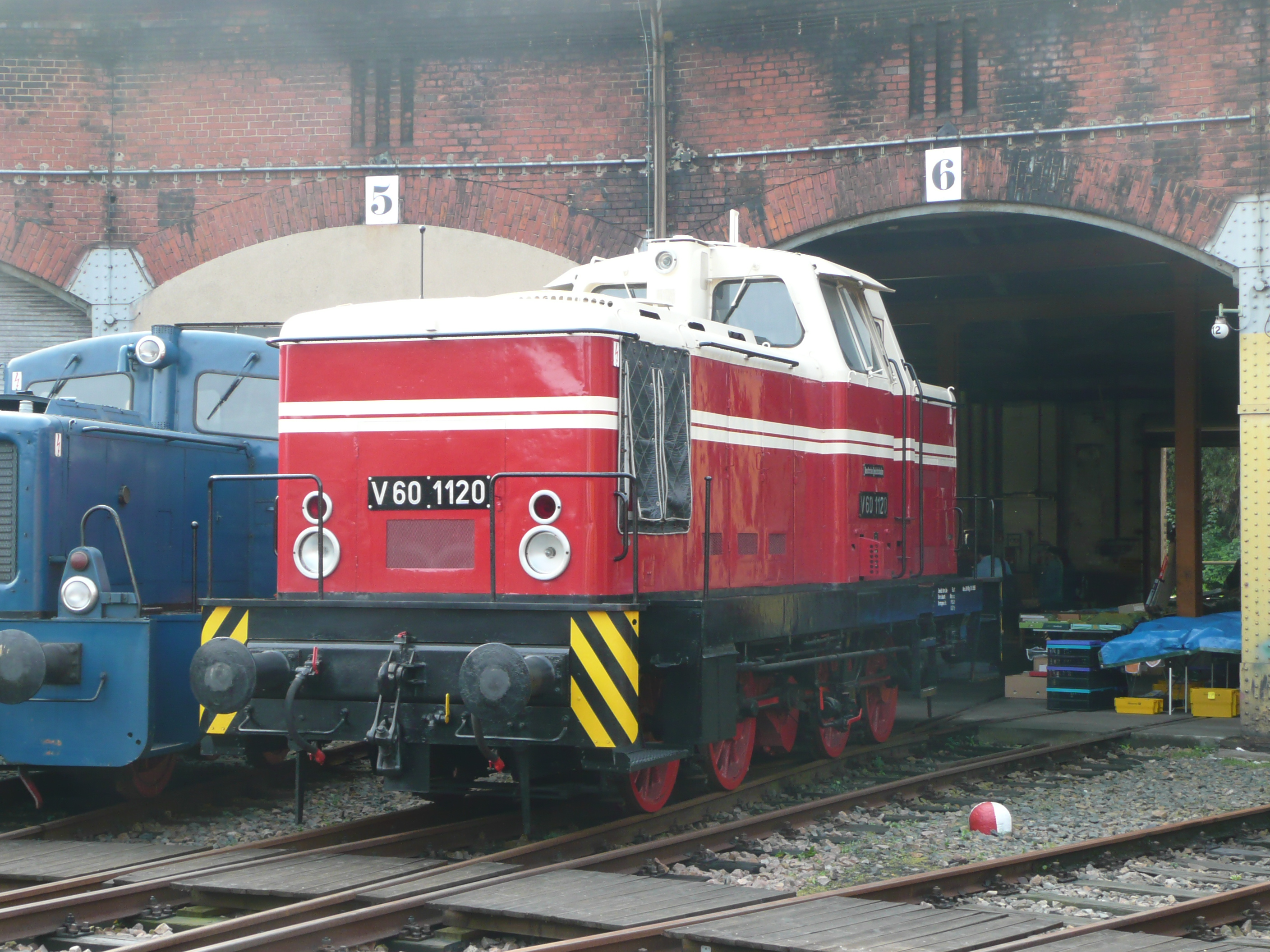
Refurbished V 60.10 in the original paintwork in the Chemnitz Hilbersdorf Railway Museum

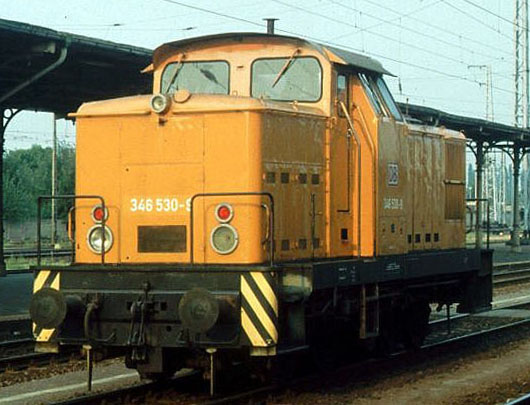
346 530 (V 60.12) in Stendal Hauptbahnhof

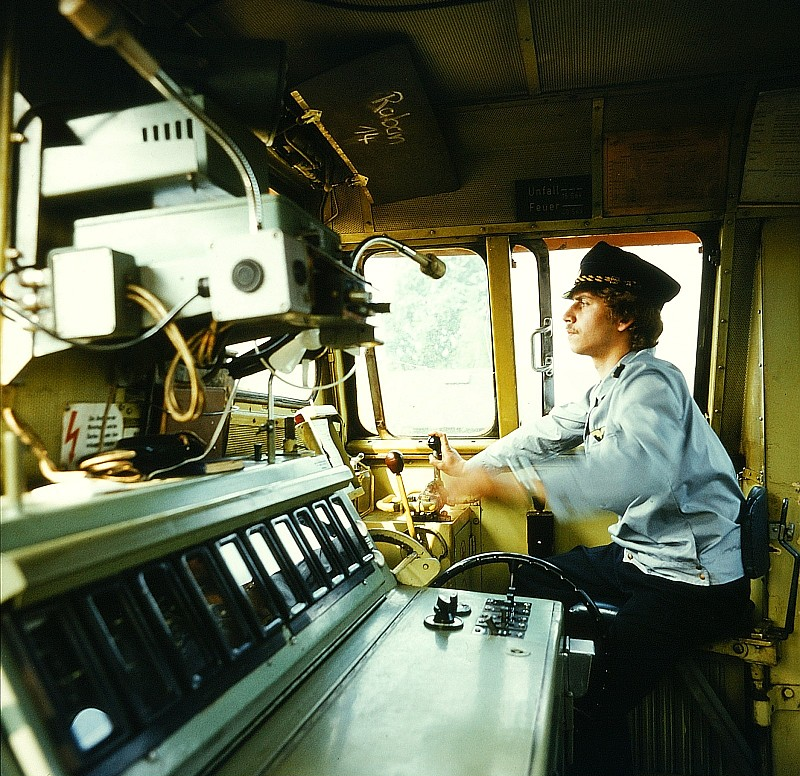
Driver's cab of 106 362 as Raban 14

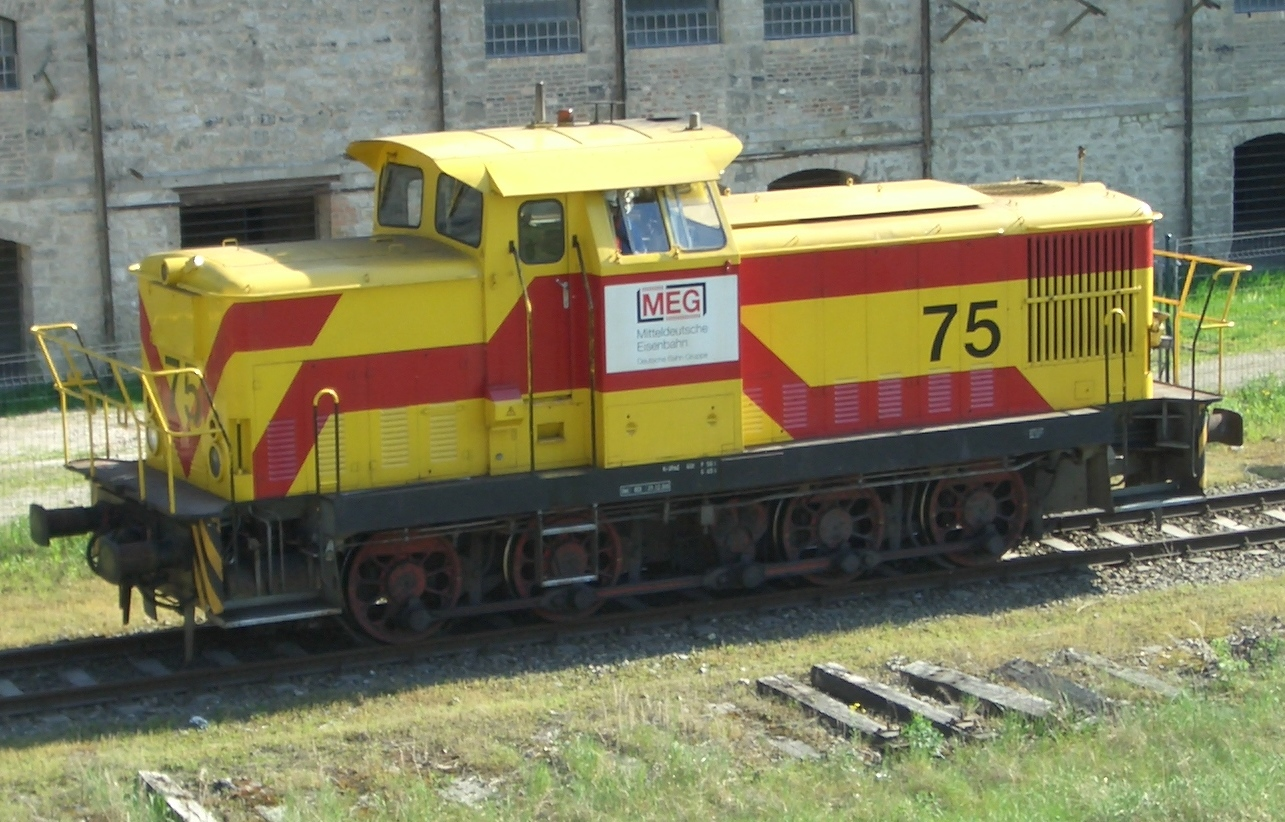
345 375-0 (Mitteldeutsche Eisenbahn 75) in Rüdersdorf bei Berlin

With 2,256 units, the design in one of the most frequently built European standard gauge locomotives. 188 locomotives were built by LKM in Babelsberg, the remainder by LEW in Hennigsdorf.

== Class 347 ==
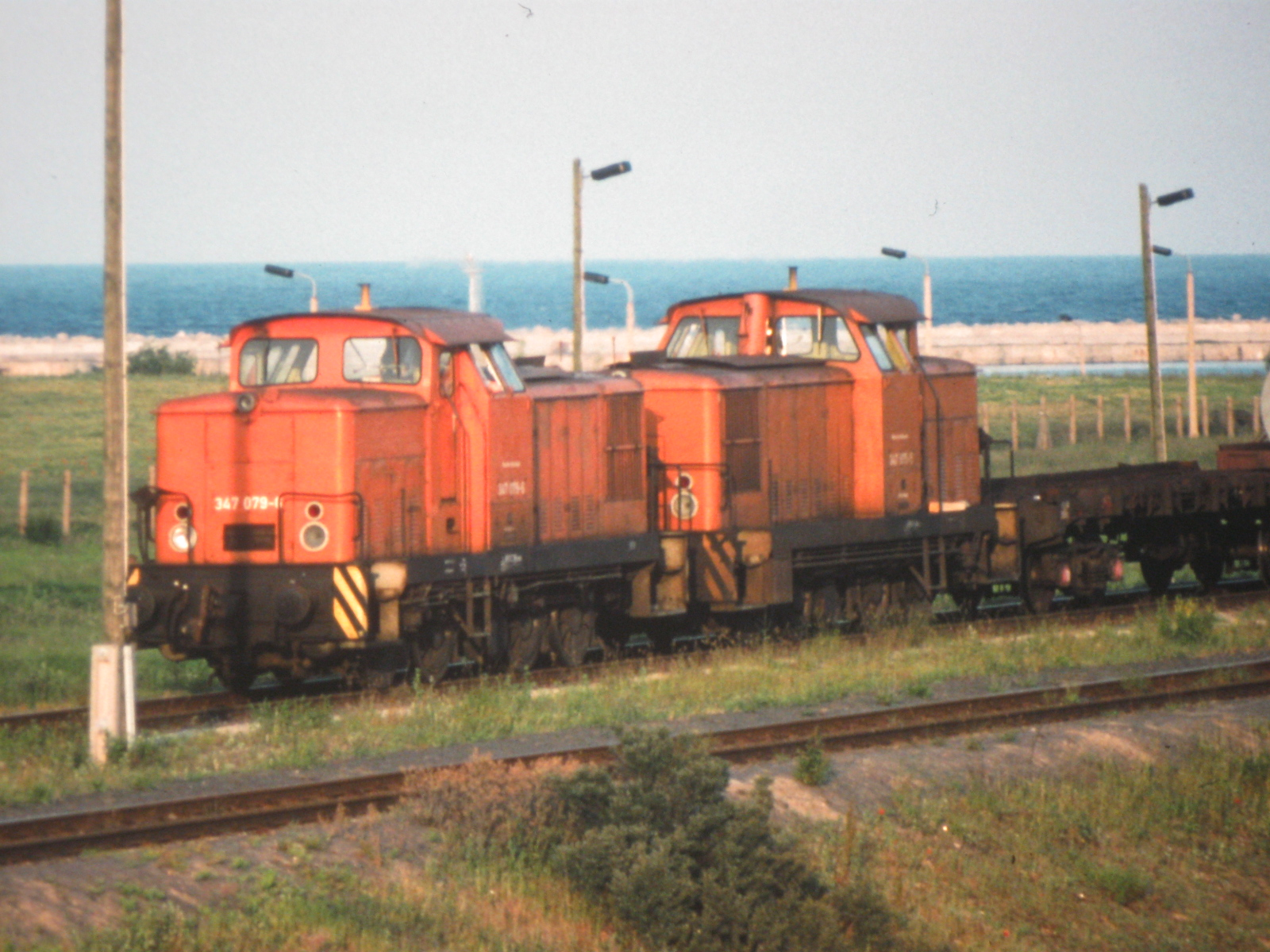
Broad gauge locos of the DB class 347 in Mukran in 1993

In 1986, the last major transport project in East Germany was the new Mukran Ferry Port in Sassnitz. The port was primarily used to provide a trouble-free connection between East Germany and the former Soviet Union. In 1989, five train ferries ran in regular service between Mukran and Klaipėda in Lithuania. Since the Soviet railways have a wider gauge of 1,520 mm (4 ft 11 27/32 in), the ferries and 340 ha (840 acres) port facilities were built with 48 km (30 miles) of standard gauge and 24 km (15 miles) of broad gauge tracks.

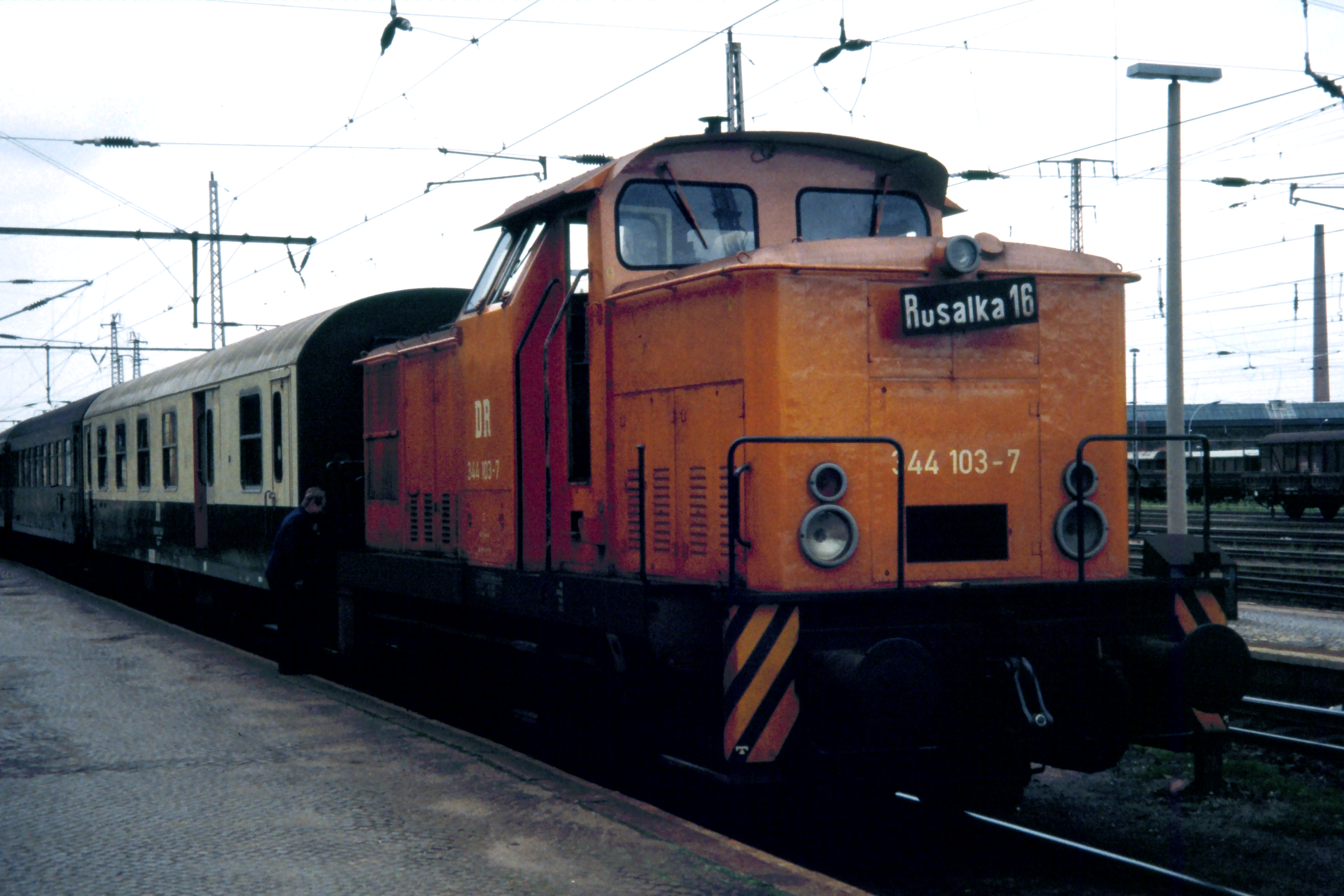
DR 344 103 as Rusalka 16 in Wittenberge

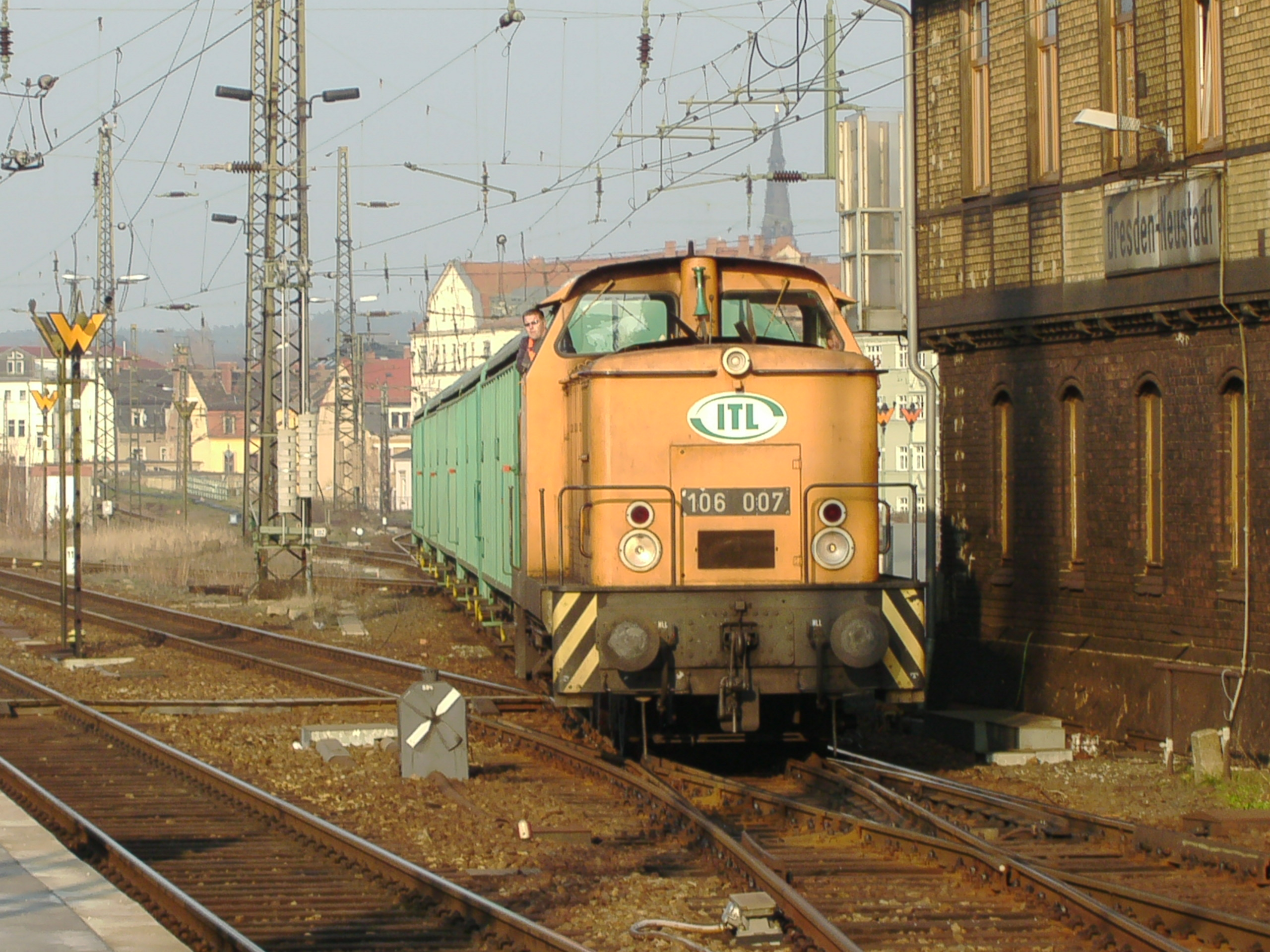
The robust construction makes the V 60 a popular locomotive with private railways like the ITL

== Livery ==
In the first series, the original paintwork was red with white stripes; later, the DR painted all shunting locomotives yellow. When this the paint got a bit older and dirtier, the then golden-brown paint was reminiscent of a grilled chicken. There, locomotives in this colour were given the nickname Goldbroiler.
