= Édouard Beugniot =

French engineer

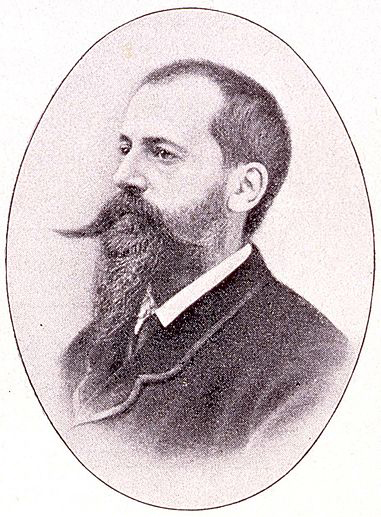
Portrait of Edouard Beugniot published in 1902 by la Société industrielle de Mulhouse

Édouard Beugniot (1822-1878) was a French engineer, designer of the Beugniot lever, a system for articulating the driving axles of railway locomotives.

== Career ==
Jean Gaspard Edouard Beugniot was born in Masevaux on 12 February 1822. His parents were Jean Claude Beugniot, who worked at the spinning factory of Nicolas Koechlin in the same city, and Henriette Berger-Pfeffel. At age 15, Édouard Beugniot left Masevaux to go to Mulhouse as an apprentice mechanic in the foundry of André Koechlin & Cie, whose founder André Koechlin was the first cousin of Nicolas Koechlin.

In 1844, Édouard Beugniot was 22 when he was appointed head of the locomotive department of André Koechlin & Cie. Two years later he qualified as a civil engineer. When the company became Société Alsacienne de Constructions Mécaniques, he directed the locomotive construction sector at the Mulhouse plant and worked with Alfred de Glehn. Beugniot designed a system for articulating the driving axles of railway locomotives, known as the Beugniot lever.

== Family ==
Édouard married Maria Charlotte Clémentine Leydle. They had only one child, Marie Jeanne Claudine Henriette Beugniot born in 1859, who married Auguste Jean Hyacinthe Salin in 1878.

== Death ==
Édouard Beuniot died on 25 October 1878. He is buried in the Cemetery rue Lefebvre in Mulhouse. His grave has a bust signed Wiedmaier with, on the pedestal, the inscription "To Edouard Beugniot, engineer, his workers and his collaborators".

== Publication ==
- Édouard Beugniot et Lebleu, Mémoire sur une locomotive de montagne système E.Beugniot construite par MM.A.Koechlin et Cie : suivi du rapport présenté au nom du comité de mécanique sur la locomotive de montagne de M.E.Beugniot (séance du 28 novembre 1860), Mulhouse, A.Koechlin et Cie, 1860, 97 p..

== Honours ==
- Chevalier de l’ordre des Saints Maurice et Lazare (from King Victor Emmanuel)
- Officier de l’ordre de Charles III (from the Spanish government)
