= Società Anonima per la Strada Ferrata dell'Italia Centrale =

Defunct railway company in Italy

The Società Anonima per la Strada Ferrata dell'Italia Centrale was a railway company established in 1851 for the purpose of creating a railway link between Piacenza, Bologna and Tuscany. It later became part of the Milan - Bologna Railway.

== History ==
The company was established in Florence by Bartolomeo Cini with the collaboration of the brothers Pietro and Tommaso, in order to obtain the concession, following the Convention stipulated in Rome on 1 May 1851 between the governments of the Papal States, of the Austrian Empire, of the Duchy of Modena, of the Duchy of Parma and of the Grand Duchy of Tuscany for the construction of a railway starting in Piacenza and continuing to Parma, Reggio Emilia and Modena up to Bologna and from there towards Tuscany and Prato or Pistoia. There would be a junction at Reggio Emilia with a branch coming from the Po in the direction of Mantua.

=== Finance ===
A Building and Administration Committee was set up which, once activated, would be replaced by a Management Committee. A fund was established of seventy-five million Italian lire divided into seventy-five thousand bearer shares. Article 5 of the Trust Act established that, in addition to the company's headquarters in Florence, a domicile in Modena would also have to be elected, in which a Plenipotentiary Representative would be established to deal definitively with the International Commission established for the purposes of the Modena project.

The company began issuing shares to raise the necessary capital for which the governments would guarantee a 5% interest. The following years, however, did not give the expected results as regards the raising of capital needed for the works on the Bologna - Pistoia section. In the summer of 1853 the company began the excavation of two shafts for the construction of the Apennine Tunnel and some preliminary works along the way. Financial difficulties slowed the execution of the work.

=== Reorganization ===
In December 1854, the "International Commission" had to meet again to redefine the structure of the "Railway track of Central Italy" that risked not being able to finish the work undertaken. The following year, projects to reorganize the contract were put forward. The Count and banker Pietro Bastogi, who was involved at the request of Bartolomeo Cini himself, offered to contribute to the financing and to take over the commercial management of the company. The "Commission" rejected the solution by presenting other candidates. Under pressure from the Austrian Government, the Duke of Galliera became interested in entering the affair and also Paulin Talabot who was closely connected to the Parisian Rothschild house. On 14 March 1856 a new agreement was signed in Vienna with which the Austrian government transferred its Lombardo - Veneto lines to the private company that had been set up with the participation of the aforementioned subjects.

=== New company ===
On 17 March 1856, the agreement with the Duchies of Parma and Modena, the Grand Duchy of Tuscany and the Papal States was transferred to a new company, the Imperial-regia società privilegiata delle strade ferrate lombardo-venete e dell'Italia Centrale. The company was formed with finance from the Rothschild houses in Vienna, Paris and London and the participation of Italian financiers including Pietro Bastogi and the Dukes Lodovico Melzi and Raffaele de Ferrari. It was licensed to finish the Central Apennine Railway (from Piacenza to Pistoia) and the branch to Reggio Emilia for Borgoforte. On 24 May 1856, the concession already granted (16 June 1851) to the Società Anonima per la Strada Ferrata dell'Italia Centrale regarding the Pistoia - Bologna line passed to the new company.
