= Giovi Pass =

- Passo dei Giovi (Italian); Passo di Zoi (Ligurian)
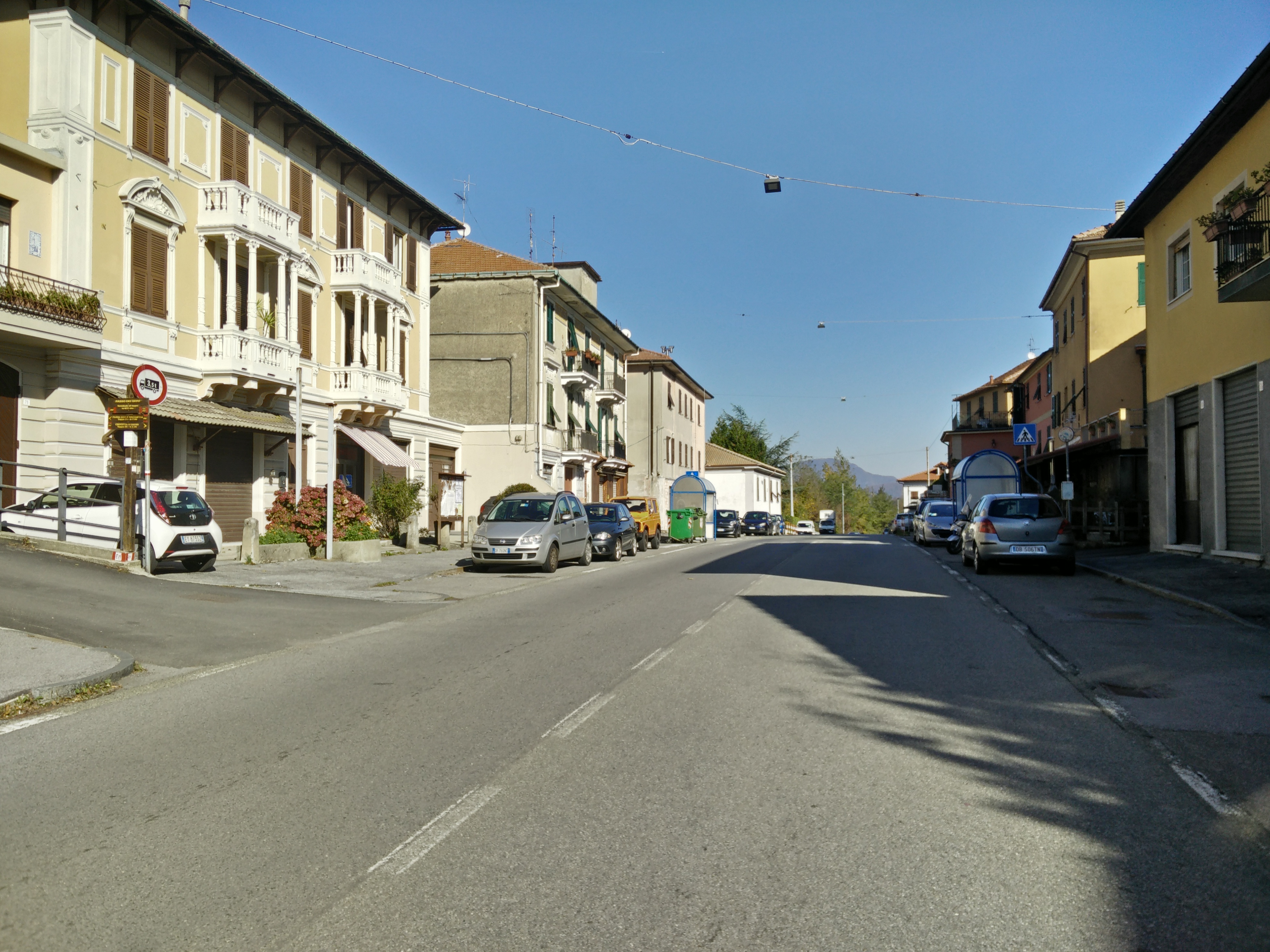
- Giovi Pass

- Location within Alps
- Elevation: 472 metres (1,549 ft)
- Traversed by: SS 35 dei Giovi; Turin–Genoa railway

Third Approach
- Location: Liguria, Italy
- Range: Apennines
- Coordinates: 44°33′09″N 08°56′14″E

The Giovi Pass (Italian: Passo dei Giovi [ˈpasso dei ˈdʒoːvi]; Ligurian: Passo di Zoi [ˈpasːu di ˈzuːi]) is a pass in Italy in the northwestern Ligurian Apennines north of Genoa.

== Geography ==
The pass is at 472 metres (1,548 feet).

A railroad from Genoa to Turin and Milan runs through the pass via a tunnel that is 1,686 metres (5,531 feet) long.

== Hiking ==
The pass is also accessible by off-road mountain paths and is crossed by the Alta Via dei Monti Liguri, a long-distance trail from Ventimiglia (province of Imperia) to Bolano (province of La Spezia).

== See also ==
- List of highest paved roads in Europe
- List of mountain passes
