= Società per le strade ferrate dell'Alta Italia =

Defunct Italian railway company

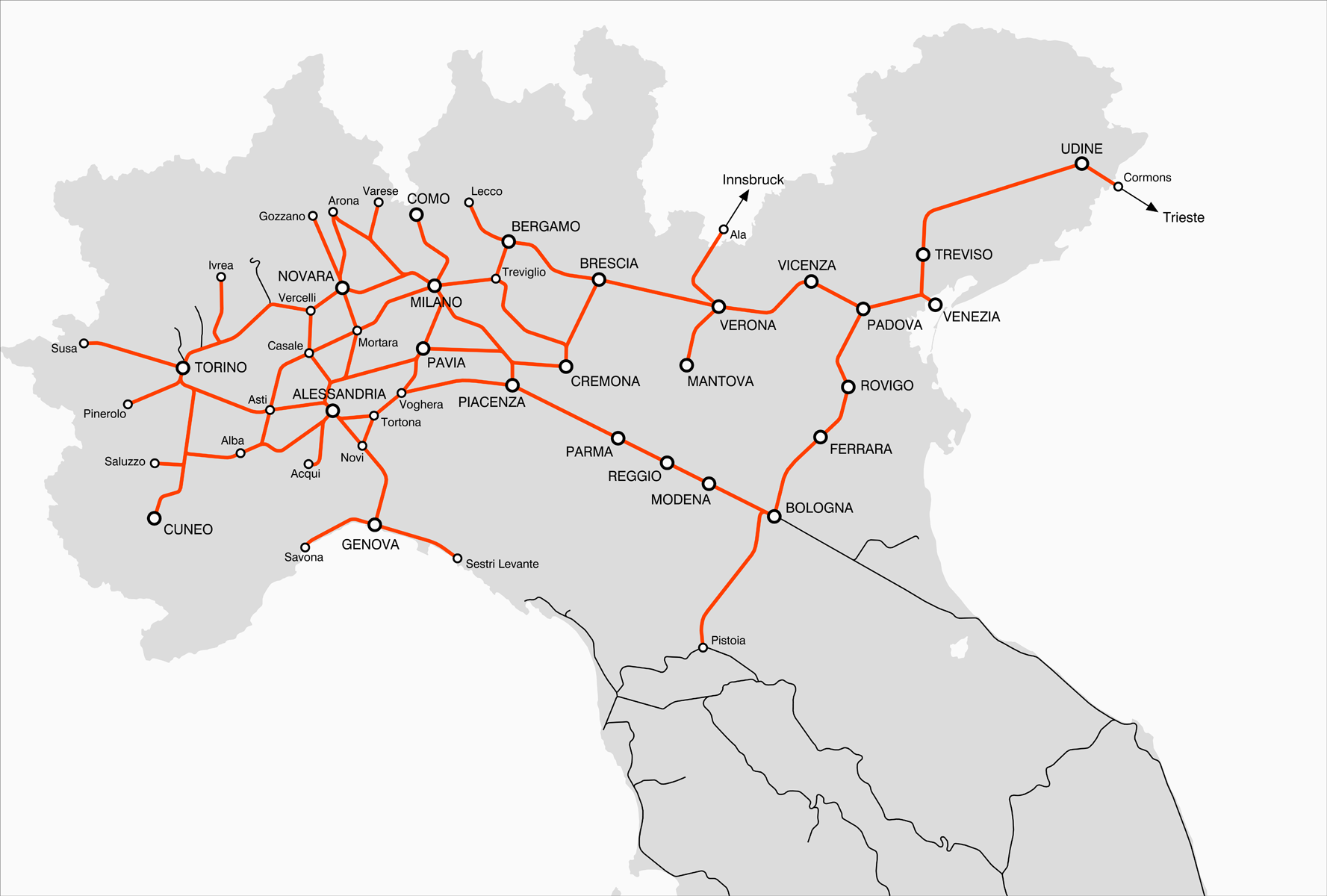
SFAI lines at 20.9.1870

The Società per le strade ferrate dell'Alta Italia (Upper Italian Railways, SFAI) was an Italian railway company from 1865 to 1885.

== History ==
It was established on 1 July 1865 with 1,057.5 miles (1,701.9 km) of line it acquired from the state railway of the Kingdom of Sardinia (Piedmont) (453.5 miles (729.8 km)), the part of the state railway of the former Kingdom of Lombardy–Venetia (604 miles (972 km)) that had been absorbed into the Kingdom of Italy in 1859 after the Second Italian War of Independence and some other private railways. At its establishment, it included the Turin–Genoa, the Fréjus line, the Turin–Milan, Milan–Chiasso, Milan–Domodossola, Milan–Bologna and the Bologna–Pistoia lines. After Austria's defeat in the Third Italian War of Independence in 1866, the railways of the Veneto (amounting to 230 miles (370 km)), including the Milan–Venice line, were transferred to the SFAI. On 1 July 1885 its network was taken over by the Rete Mediterranea (Mediterranean Network) and the Rete Adriatica (Adriatic Network), with lines generally west of Milan going to the Rete Mediterranea.

== SFAI locomotives ==
The following list is incomplete.

SFAI nos. (1865)	SFAI nos. (1869)	Wheel arrangement	Notes	Picture
31-90	?	2-2-2	Locomotives LVCI 1-50, 155-164	
91-110	?	2-2-2	FS Class 103	
210-238	?	0-4-2	FS Class 113	
250-258	?	0-4-2	Locomotives SFAI 250-258	
259-264	?	0-4-2		
301-311	?	2-4-0	Locomotives SFAI 301-311	
381-382	Names: Ariosto and Raffaello	2-4-0	Locomotives LVCI 79-90	
393	?	4-4-0		
703-708	767-772	0-6-0	FS Class 396	
709-713, 718-757	?	0-6-0		
714-717	778-781	0-6-0	Locomotives LVCI 116-119	
805-1000	?	0-6-0		
1051-1070	1401-1420	0-4-0+0-4-0	Mastodonte dei Giovi (locomotive)	
1106-1115	1417-1426	0-6-0+0-6-0		
1181-1200	?	4-6-0	FS Class 650	
1281-1300	1201-1220	0-8-0	FS Class 400	
1400	?	0-4-0T	Locomotive SFAI 1400	
1404-1407	?	0-4-0		
1408-1411	?	0-6-0ST		
1461-1473	?	2-4-0		
