= Turin–Genoa railway =

Railway line in Italy

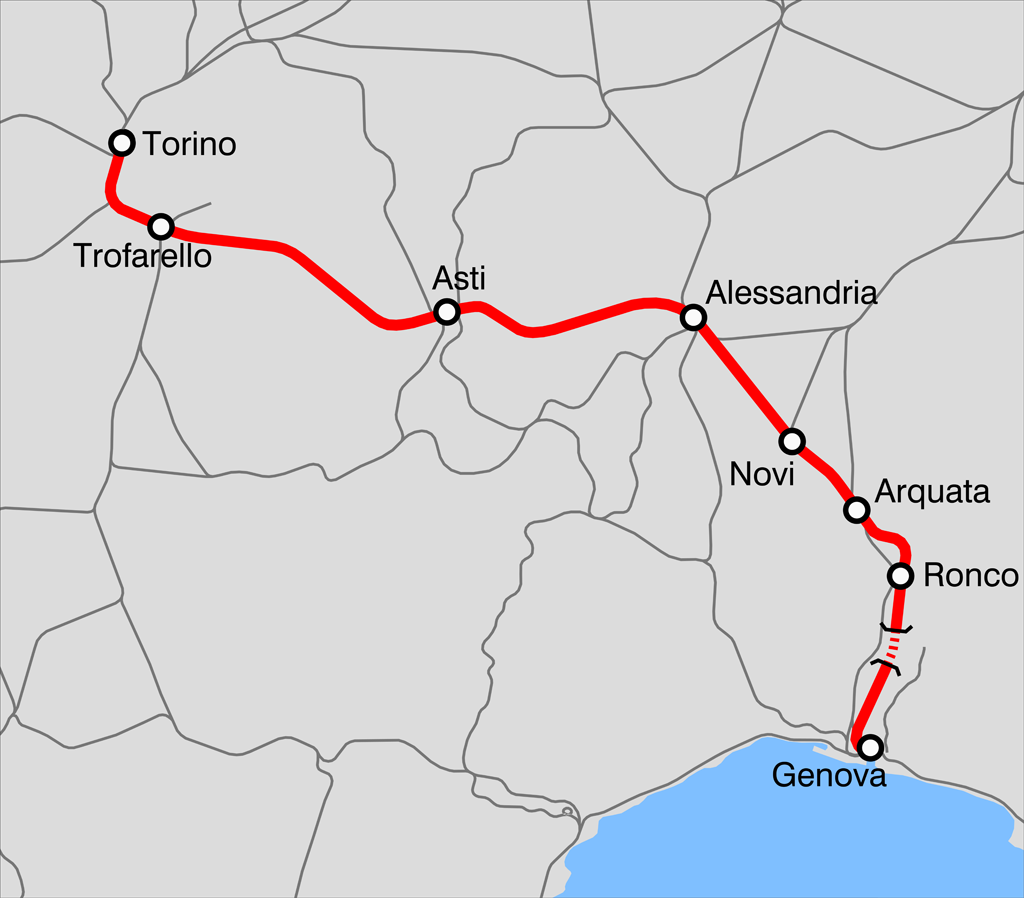
- Map of the railway line

Overview
- Owner: RFI

Service
- Operator(s): Trenitalia

History
- Opened: 1848–1853

Technical
- Line length: 169 km (105 mi)
- Track gauge: 1,435 mm (4 ft 8 1/2 in) standard gauge
- Electrification: 3000 V DC

The Turin–Genoa railway line is a major Italian rail line, connecting the cities of Turin and Genoa. It is 169 kilometres (105 mi) long.

== History ==
The Kingdom of Sardinia (Savoy) had started building railways late compared to other European countries and decided after much discussion that the Turin–Genoa railway would be built at state expense. The route of the line was defined by a government engineer, Luigi Ranco in 1844. Work began on 13 February 1845 and was completed on 18 December 1853. In order to cross of the Apennines the 3,259-metre-long (10,692 ft) Giovi Tunnel was built, which at the time was the longest in the world. The whole line was built with double-track and had over thirty substantial bridges and long tunnels. It was progressively opened as track was completed, even before the completion of stations or the second track.

=== Torino Porta Nuova–Trofarello ===
The first leg, only 13 kilometres (8.1 mi) long from Torino Porta Nuova (which had not yet been built) to Trofarello, was opened on 24 September 1848 with a simple ceremony. Regular public service began the next day with six pairs of trains traveling between 7 am and 7 pm. Already this section required the building of the first important work with a long bridge over the Po River next to the Moncalieri station.

=== Trofarello–Asti ===
The second section of the line to Asti was 42 kilometres (26 mi) long, and was opened on 15 November 1849. This part of the line overcame major difficulties crossing the hills between San Paolo Solbrito and Villafranca where it had to climb a grade of 2.6 percent, then considered nearly impossible for trains to climb. Initially a temporary line was built between San Paolo and Dusino, with a connection from Dusino to Stenevasso provided by a horse-drawn bus. This system was unsuccessful and it was decided to purchase a locomotive from Robert Stephenson designed for the climb. This was built at his workshop in Newcastle upon Tyne and went into service in August 1851.

=== Asti–Alessandria–Novi–Arquata ===
On 1 January 1850 the 22-kilometre (14 mi) section was opened to Alessandria and Novi Ligure and on 10 February 1852 the 56 kilometres (35 mi) to Arquata was opened; the railway now reached 124 kilometres (77 mi) from Turin. This route provided no major difficulties except for the bridges near Serravalle Scrivia. The rail service proved to be satisfactory to the public, with the train taking only 3 hours and 40 minutes to cover the whole route, leading to improved profits for the company.

=== Arquata–Busalla–Genoa ===
This section required large engineering works. The 18-kilometre (11 mi) extension to Busalla was opened on 10 February 1853 and required the building of eight bridges and four tunnels of lengths varying from 508 to 866 metres (1,667 to 2,841 ft).

On 18 December 1853 the line was completed with the opening of the last 23 kilometres (14 mi) between Busalla and Genova Piazza Principe station. The crossing of the Apennine was particularly difficult, especially the Giovi Tunnel, which was the longest in the world and particularly expensive to build. The route also required traction to cope with the long and steep gradient between Busalla and Pontedecimo. A group of engineers, including Henri Maus and Germain Sommeiller, studied new types of locomotives, also built by the Stephenson workshops, then known as the Mastodons of Giovi which consisted of two locomotives coupled back-to-back under the control of one driver and capable of hauling trains on the slope of 3.6 percent, which could not be matched by any other locomotive. They were able to haul trains of 150 tonnes (170 short tons) at 12 kilometres per hour (7.5 mph).

To avoid delaying the opening of the line, Piazza Principe station was opened as a temporary station, as had already happened at Torino Porta Nuova station and at other locations on the line.

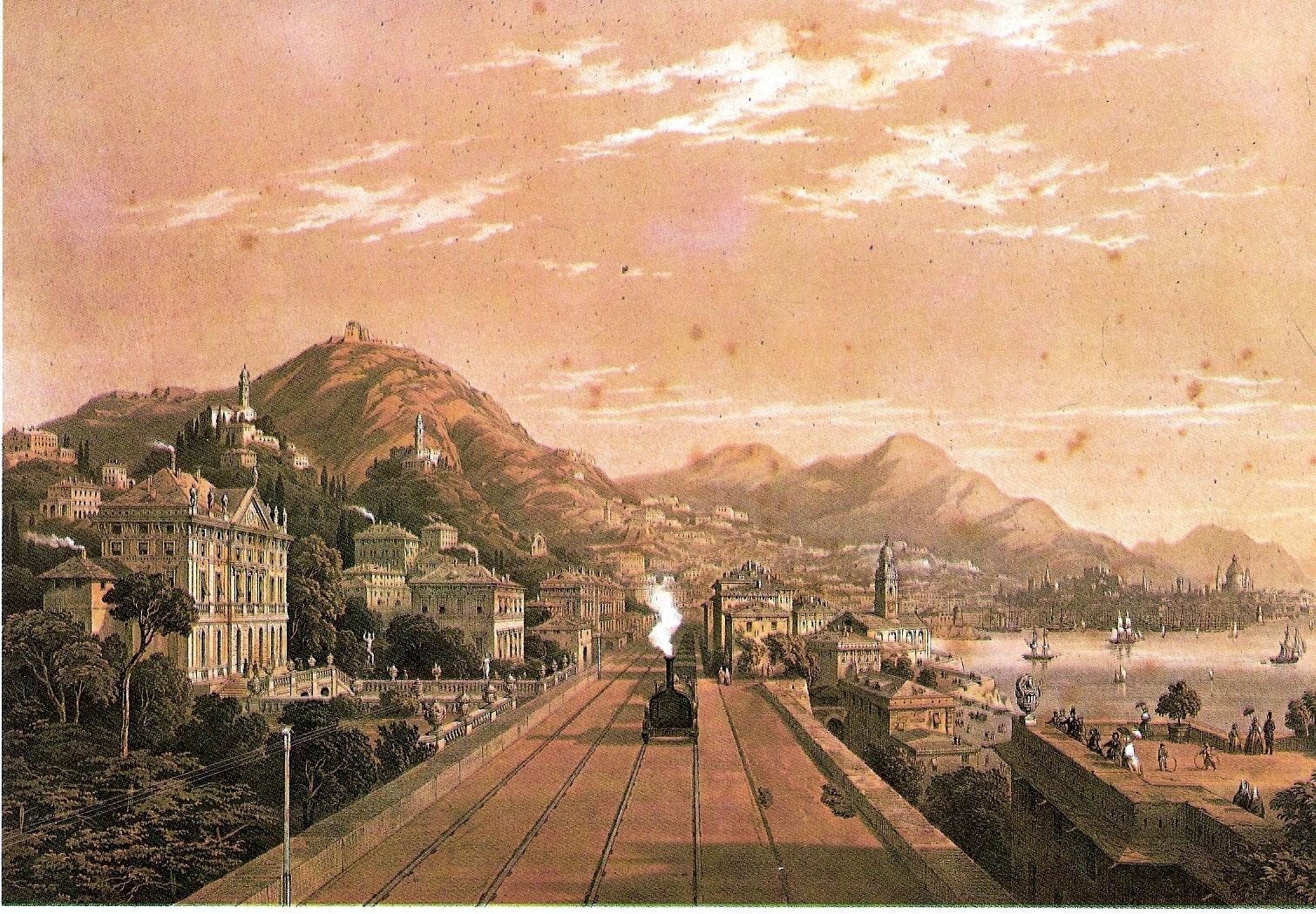
Opening of the line between Principe and Sampierdarena in 1854

Since the new railway had a crucial role in moving both freight and passengers to and from the port a connection was built between Piazza Principe station and the port at Piazza Caricamento, almost entirely at grade along the road now called Via Gramsci. The line was opened to traffic on 18 December 1853 and on 20 February 1854 it was officially opened in the presence of King Victor Emmanuel and Prime Minister Cavour, who had both arrived on the royal train. The Archbishop of Genoa basptised three locomotives during the ceremony.

=== Genoa Piazza Principe–Genoa Brignole ===
In 1865 the line was absorbed into the new Upper Italian Railway Company (Italian: Società per le strade ferrate dell'Alta Italia). The line became part of the Mediterranean Network (Italian: Rete Mediterranea) in 1885 and part of Ferrovie dello Stato in 1905. On 25 July 1872 a tunnel was opened linking the two main stations in Genoa between Piazza Principe and Brignole, connecting with the line to Pisa and Rome, increasing the length of the Turin–Genoa line to its current 169 kilometres (105 mi).

=== Second Pass ===
Because of the early industrialisation of Turin and despite the difficulty of operating the line and the confined docks of Genoa, the line immediately became the busiest railway in Italy. On 15 May 1889 an alternative 24-kilometre-long (15 mi) line through the Giovi pass opened from Quadrivio Torbella (Rivarolo Canavese) to Ronco Scrivia, known as the Second Pass (Italian: secondo valico). The new line was needed to meet the significant increase in demand for freight transport to and from the port of Genoa. The route of the line is close to the original line, but it is much faster and safer because it presents fewer problems for traction and braking because of its much lower gradients. This was made possible by bridges and especially by the 8,294-metre-long (27,211 ft) Ronco Tunnel. In 1922 it was enhanced further by duplication from Ronco to Arquata, where the line to Milan via Tortona connects.

== The Giovi disaster ==
On 11 August 1898 there was a rail disaster between the stations Pontedecimo and Busalla stations. A freight train lost its driver in the long Giovi Tunnel and crashed at high speed into a passenger train stopped at Piano Orizzontale dei Giovi station waiting for a train from Busalla to pass before continuing. Thirteen people were killed and twenty were wounded. Apparently the train crew was suffocated by smoke, and the driver fell from his cabin, leaving the train out of control. At that time steam locomotives were fired with cheap coal briquettes produced by a mixture of pitch, tar and coal dust, which gave off poisonous fumes and forced train crews to cover their mouth and nose with soaked bandages in the long tunnels. After passing through the Giovi Tunnel (taking nine minutes uphill and eleven minutes downhill), drivers were given a glass of milk in order to detoxify. Electrification of the line began to be considered following the accident.

== Electrification ==
As a result of the Giovi disaster of 1898 and the saturation of traffic on both lines through the Giovi pass—as steam powered trains could not carry more than 2000 wagons per day in 1907—and given the excellent results obtained from the trial of three-phase power on the lines in Valtellina electrification was initiated on the line at 3,300 V AC three-phase at 15 Hz.

On 1 August 1910 electrification was activated from Pontedecimo to Busalla; on 1 December 1911 the section to Rivarolo Ligure Junction was electrified; on 1 November 1913 the section to Genoa Sampierdarena was electrified; on 21 June 1915 the section between Busalla and Ronco was electrified and finally on 15 May 1916 the project was completed with the electrification of the Genova Piazza Principe station. Trains on the line were hauled by Class E550 locomotives.

In 1924 the electrification of the line was completed with the activation of the long section from Ronco Scrivia to Turin Porta Nuova.

Between 1961 and 1964 the line was one of the last to be converted to 3,000 V DC electrification, although it had been one of the first to be electrified with three-phase power.

== The line today ==
In 1963 the new Granarolo Tunnel was opened, which allowed the direct connection of the station Genova Piazza Principe from the Giovi second pass, skipping the busy junctions around Sampierdarena, significantly reducing the time taken by long-distance trains. In 1994 the line was devastated near Alessandria by the flooding of the Tanaro. Today, the passenger traffic is served by Trenitalia with regional, InterCity, InterCity Night Express and Eurostar InterCity trains.

A new high-speed line is being constructed between Milan and Genoa, which would include a third line through the Giovi pass, allowing the full separation of services with local passenger services on the original line, freight on the second pass and long-distance passenger services on the new line (third pass).

== See also ==
- List of railway lines in Italy
