= Lombardisch-Venetianische und Central-Italienische Eisenbahn =

Defunct railway company in Italy

The LVCI company (full title Imperial-regia società privilegiata delle strade ferrate lombardo-venete e dell'Italia Centrale was a private railway company that, from 1856 to 1859, had the concession for the construction and operation of the railway network in the Kingdom of Lombardy–Venetia and central Italy.

== History ==
=== The convention ===
The company was born as a result of a convention signed in Vienna on 14 March 1856 "concerning the assumption, construction and operation of the railways in the Lombard-Veneto Kingdom" and of the international treaty of the following 17 March which transferred the concession already given in 1851 to the Società Anonima per la Strada Ferrata dell'Italia Centrale. Article 43 of the Vienna Convention granted "signatory gentlemen" to establish a company with residence in Vienna and to issue, after the approval of the company's bylaws, individual or bearer shares whose nominal value was not less than 600 Austrian lire. The company thus constituted therefore took over all the rights and obligations of the "concessionaire gentlemen". The convention had "the purpose of fulfilling, in the interest of commerce, as soon as possible the network of railway tracks of the Kingdom of Lombardy–Venetia and to simplify possibly the exercise and administration of the railways belonging to the Imperial Royal Treasury and forming part of the same network". It was essentially the sale of the network already built in Lombardy–Venetia and the concessions granted. The concession for the railway track of central Italy and its branches was then added.

=== Finance ===
The convention saw, as actors on one side, the imperial-ministers of finance and trade and on the other:

In Vienna

The president of the Austrian Credit Association for Trade and Industry, Prince Giovanni Adolfo of Schwarzenberg, the vice-presidents, Count Francesco Zichy and Baron A. S. di Rothschild of the Rothschild banking house.

In Italy

The Duke of Galliera, Raffaele de Ferrari in Bologna, the Duke Lodovico Melzi in Milan, Count Giuseppe Archinto in Milan represented by Messrs. Mondolfo and Broth, Pietro Bastogi in Livorno.

In France

The Rothschild brothers of Paris, represented by the Rothschild banking house in Vienna, E. Blount and Compagni, Paulin Talabot in Paris.

In England

Rothschild and sons of London, represented by the Rothschild banking house in Vienna, Samuel Laing and Matteo Uzielli of London.

=== The concession ===
The Austrian government ceded the Lombardy–Venetia (Lombardisch-Venetianische Staatsbahn) railway network, except the railway from Verona to South Tyrol, to the consortium of banks (often referred to as the company of Lombard-Veneto railways) for a global sum of 100 million Austrian lire in exchange for the concession granted for 90 years starting from 1 January 1856.

Società anonima delle strade ferrate lombardo-venete e dell'Italia centrale was the name, in Italian, with which the Imperial-Royal company (concessionaire of the railway network of the Kingdom of Lombardy–Venetia and Central Italy) was indicated in its entry to the Stock Exchange of Milan from 1 July 1858. The inscription was also the first of a joint-stock company in the said stock exchange which, until now, had only dealt with government bonds. However, the company was already listed on the Vienna Stock Exchange since its establishment at the end of 1856.

=== War ===
Proceedings were delayed by the Second Italian War of Independence of 1859 following which the territory was divided by moving the border of Lombardy–Venetia to the Mincio and part of the network was incorporated into the Südbahn. The company was in possession of the agreements signed with the Austrian Government on 14 March 1856, 8 April 1857 and 23 September 1858 and with the Austrian, Parma, Modena, Tuscany and Papal Governments on 17 March 1856. These were reconfirmed, with due variations in the agreement, and signed by the representatives of the Government of the Kingdom of Italy on June 25, 1860. The convention confirmed largely the previous ones but with some variations, including the revocation of the construction of the section up to Borgoforte.

=== Final approval ===
On 8 July 1860 the Parliament of the Kingdom of Italy approved the Convention of 25 June with which the concessions of railways in the territory granted to the company were recognized and confirmed (with the modifications specified in the same agreement and in the annexed documents agreements with the Austrian Government, on March 14, 1856, April 8, 1857, and September 23, 1858, and the convention of March 17, 1856 with the Austrian, Parma, Modenese, Tuscan and Papal governments). Following the changes, the Società anonima delle strade ferrate della Lombardia e dell'Italia Centrale was subsequently established.
