= Rete Mediterranea =

Defunct Italian railway network

Rete Mediterranea (RM) defines that part of the Italian railway network that, under the law of 27 April 1885, no. 3048 was assigned to the Società per le Strade Ferrate del Mediterraneo for operation and development. These were mainly lines from the north-west, Ligurian and Tyrrhenian. The initials RM were also used to mark locomotives and rolling stock.

== History ==
The railway networks built before 1885 were largely in concession to private individuals and were in more or less severe economic difficulties. The Kingdom of Italy, in implementation of Law no. 3048 of 27 April 1885 (also called the Railway Conventions) distributed most of the railways of the peninsula into two large networks arranged longitudinally, namely the Rete Mediterranea (Mediterranean Network), of 4,171 km and the Rete Adriatica (Adriatic Network), of 4,379 km, granting them to two large companies to operate for a fee. The Mediterranean Network had roughly the North-West, Ligurian and Tyrrhenian lines.

The concession contract provided for 60 years, but it included an option for the parties to terminate the contract at the end of every twenty years, with two years' notice. The Società per le Strade Ferrate del Mediterraneo paid the State 135 million lire and obtained, in addition to the railway lines, the rolling stock and the debts of the old networks redeemed. The State, in turn, was obliged to pay them annually, by way of compensation, 5% of the paid-up capital and according to the Statistical Yearbook of 1898, published by the Ministry of Agriculture, Industry and Commerce, the railways of the Mediterranean Network reached, at the end of 1896, 5,765 km.

In July 1897, the Mediterranean Network owned 1314 steam locomotives, 3754 coaches, 952 baggage cars and 23074 goods wagons.

== Nationalization ==
The network was nationalized under the "Fortis law" of 1905 and passed almost entirely to the new Italian State Railways (FS).
