= Asciano railway station =

Railway station in Italy

Asciano
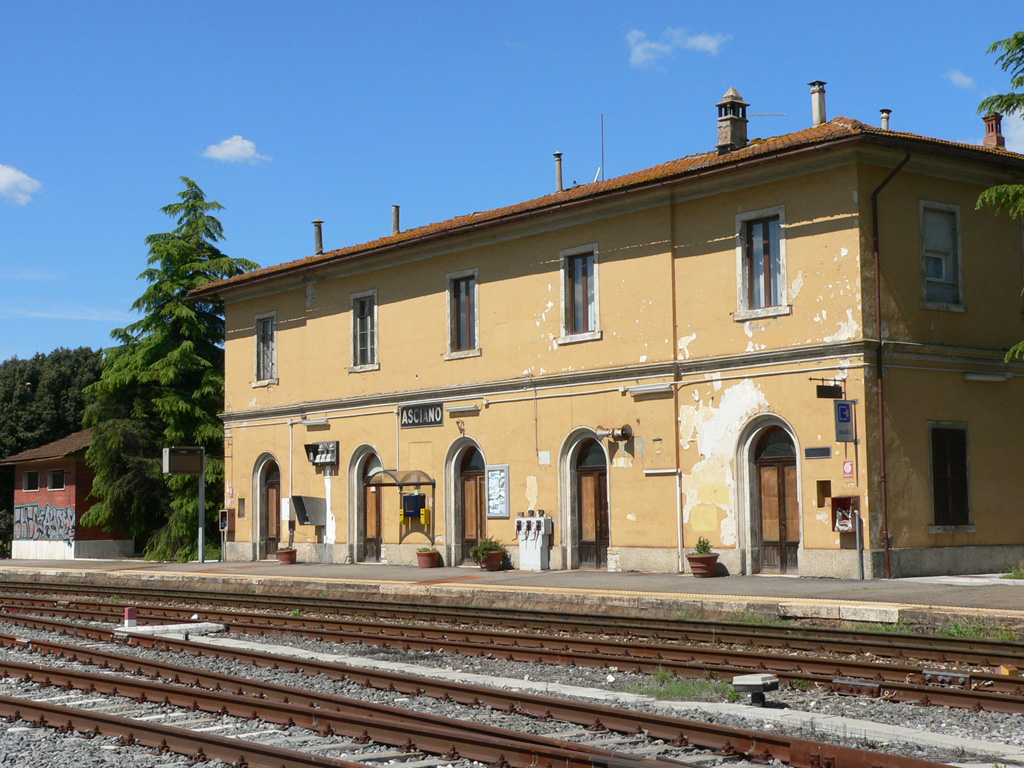
- View of the station building

General information
- Location: Viale I Maggio; Asciano SI 53041; Asciano, Siena, Tuscany; Italy
- Coordinates: 43°14′07″N 11°34′47″E
- Operator: Rete Ferroviaria Italiana; Trenitalia
- Lines: Siena–Chiusi; Asciano-–Monte Antico
- Distance: 221.371 km (137.554 mi) from Roma Termini
- Platforms: 3

Other information
- Classification: Bronze

History
- Opened: 11 September 1859; 166 years ago
Location
- Location within Tuscany Location within Italy

Asciano railway station is an Italian railway station on the Siena-Chiusi railway line in Southern Tuscany. It serves as a junction for the line to Monte Antico.

== History ==
It was opened on 11 September 1859 as an intermediate station on the Siena–Chiusi railway. In 1872 a new line opened to connect Grosseto and Siena, which branches off the main line here. Until 1927, it was the only connection between the two cities, but a new line opened between Siena and Monte Antico: traffic was significantly reduced on the section between here and Monte Antico, eventually closing to regular passenger services in 1994. Since then, regular passenger services have continued to serve this station on journeys between Siena and Chiusi–Chianciano Terme. The station has a turntable, which is occasionally used for steam locomotives that run along the Asciano–Monte Antico railway.

== Train services and movements ==
Regular passenger services to the station consist solely of regionale services, which run every day to Siena and Chiusi-Chianciano Terme, with one evening return service continuing to Empoli. The station is served by Treno Natura steam or diesel historical trains that run occasionally for tourists.

== Gallery ==
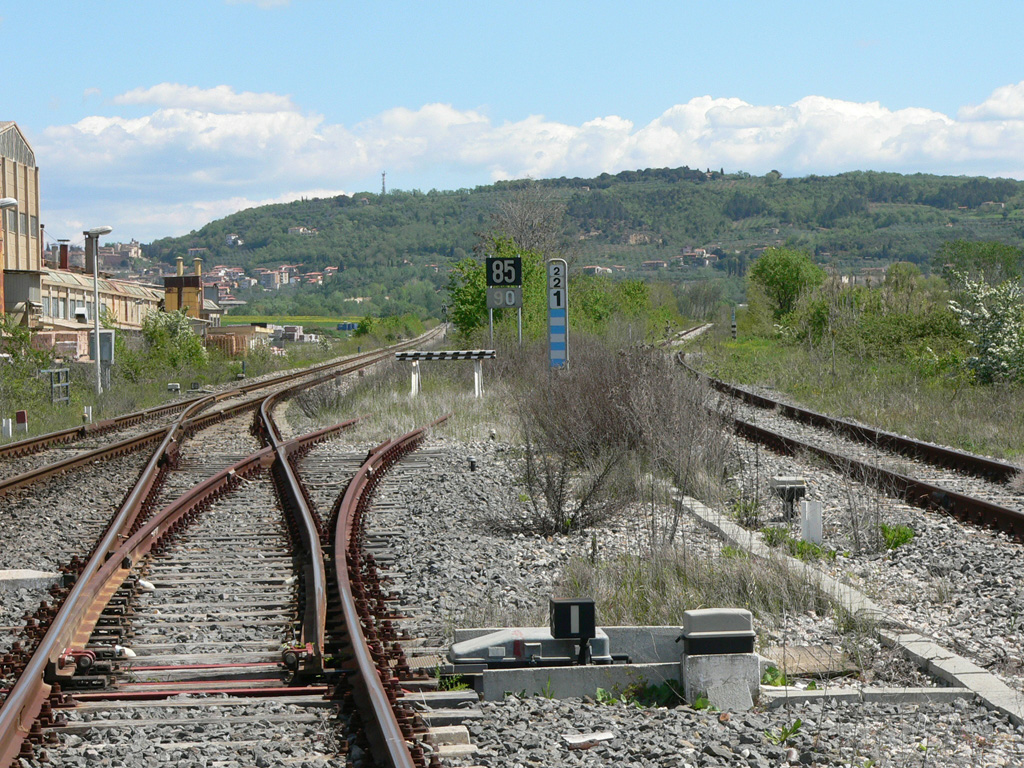
The junction at the southern end of the station, on the left continuing towards Chiusi and on the right towards Monte Antico.

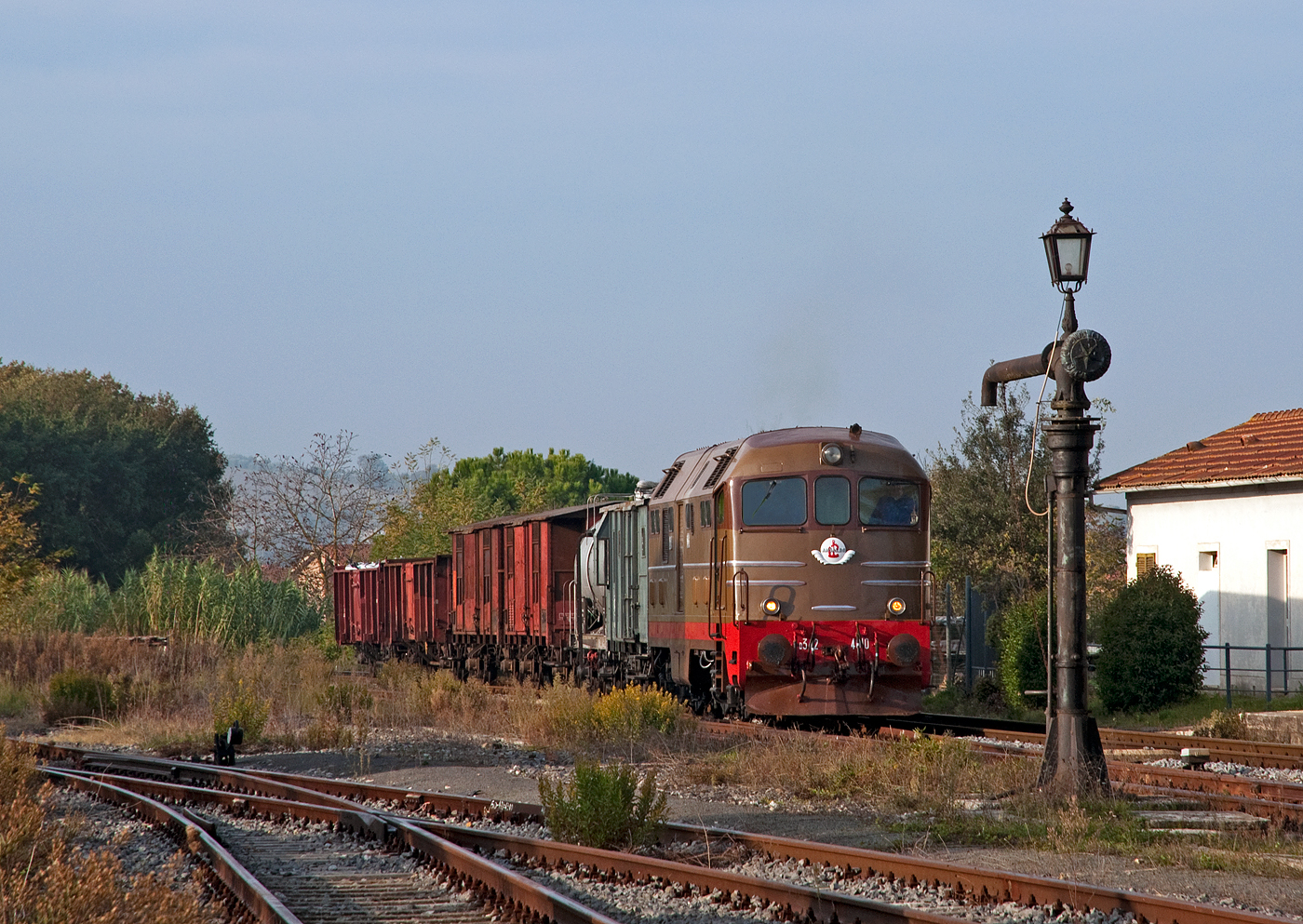
Heritage diesel locomotive approaching the station with a photography charter service.

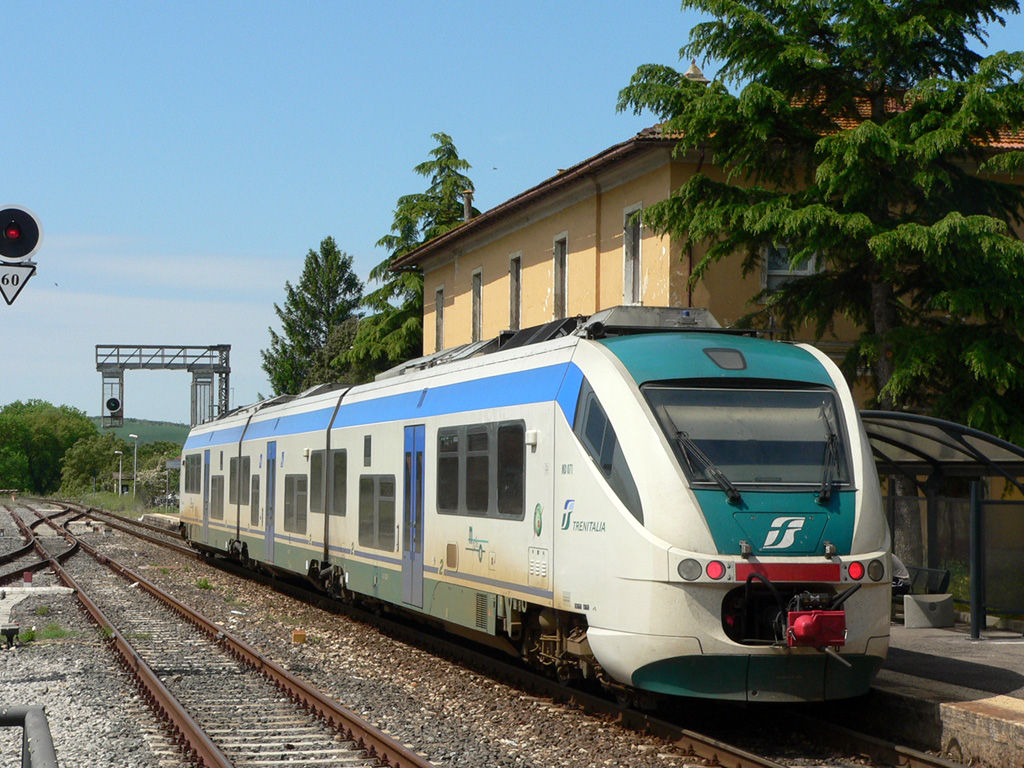
A regionale service, formed of a Minuetto DMU, leaves the station.

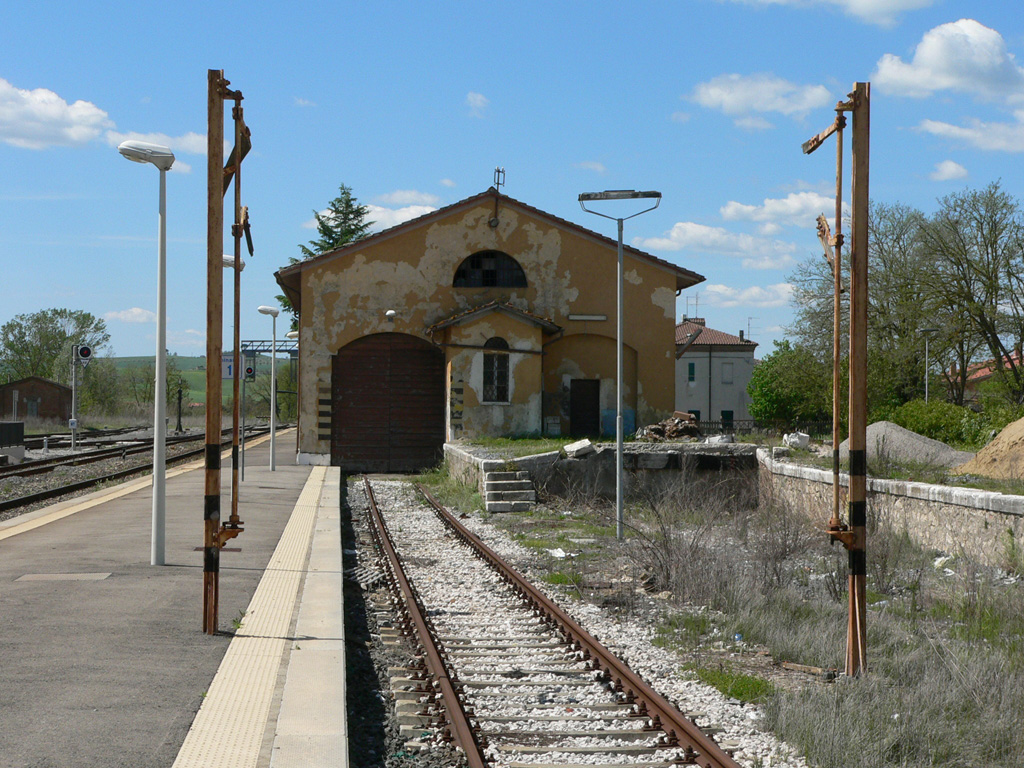
The end of the station building with a disused freight siding.

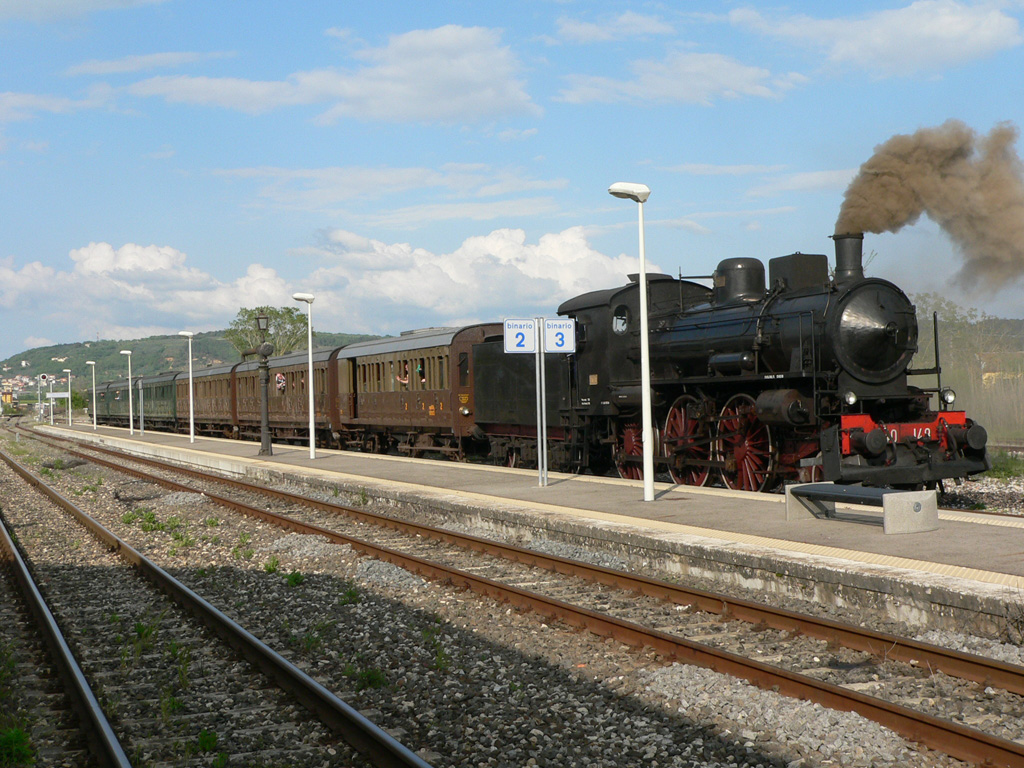
A Trenonatura steam train service arrives after running along the Val d'Orcia from Monte Antico.

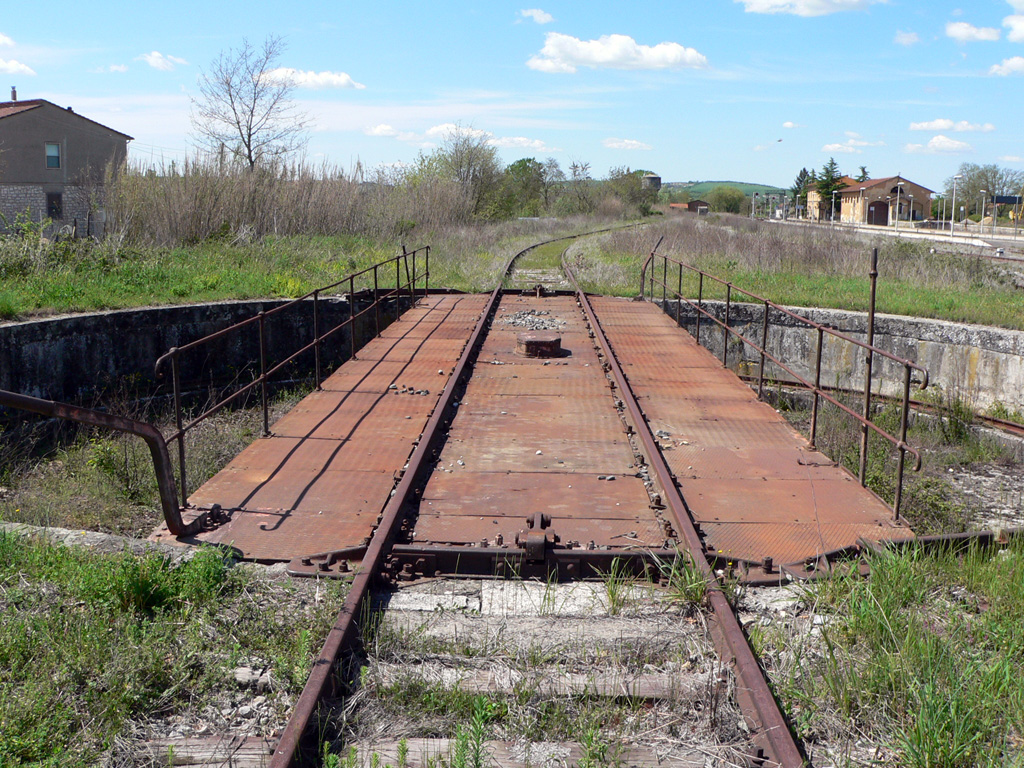
The turntable.

== See also ==
- History of rail transport in Italy
- List of railway stations in Tuscany
- Rail transport in Italy
- Railway stations in Italy
