= Orvieto railway station =

Railway station in Italy

Orvieto
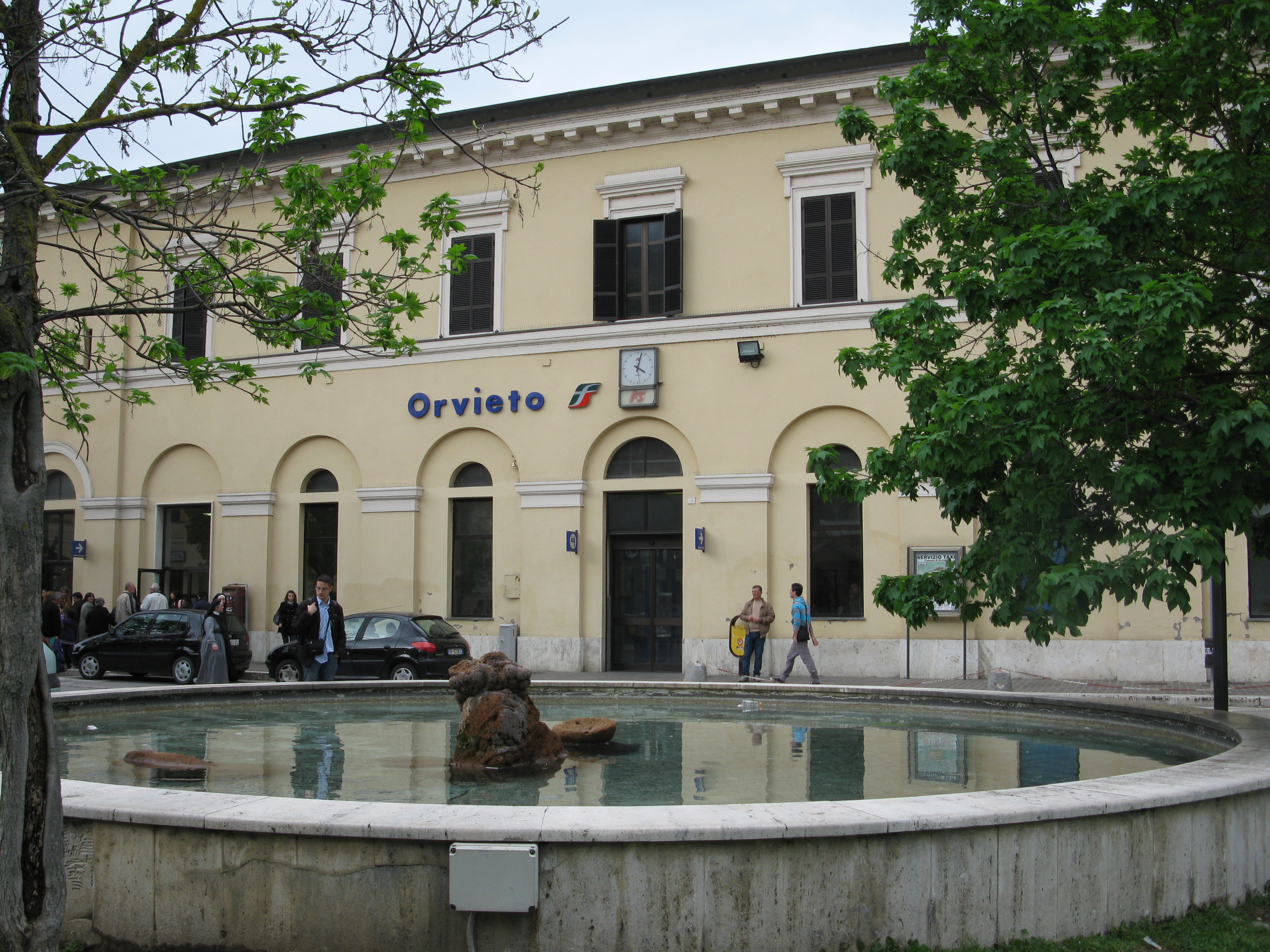
- Station building seen from via Antonio Gramsci

General information
- Location: Piazza Matteotti 14; Orvieto, Umbria, Italy
- Coordinates: 42°43′26″N 12°07′35″E
- Operator: Rete Ferroviaria Italiana
- Line: Florence–Rome
- Tracks: 3
- Train operators: Trenitalia

Other information
- Classification: Silver

History
- Opened: 27 December 1865; 160 years ago
- Electrified: 1935; 91 years ago
Location
- Location within Umbria Location within Italy

Orvieto railway station (Stazione di Orvieto) is a station in Orvieto, Umbria, Italy. It is located on the Florence–Rome railway. Its buildings and infrastructure is managed by Rete Ferroviaria Italiana, which classified it in 2008 in the silver category.

== History ==
Orvieto station was opened with the extension of the line from Empoli and Siena ("Central Tuscan Railway") from Ficulle on 27 December 1865. This line was extended to Orte on 10 March 1874 and with the opening of the Chiusi–Terontola cutoff on 15 November 1875, the line became part of the Florence–Rome railway. The route to Rome over the slow line remains unchanged.

During its first ten years the connection to Florence was over a very long route: Orvieto was in fact on the line through Siena, which is now a purely local line. It is not electrified and is still partly single track. The route to Florence passed through Chiusi, Siena, Empoli with a length of 225 kilometres.

== Buildings and infrastructure ==
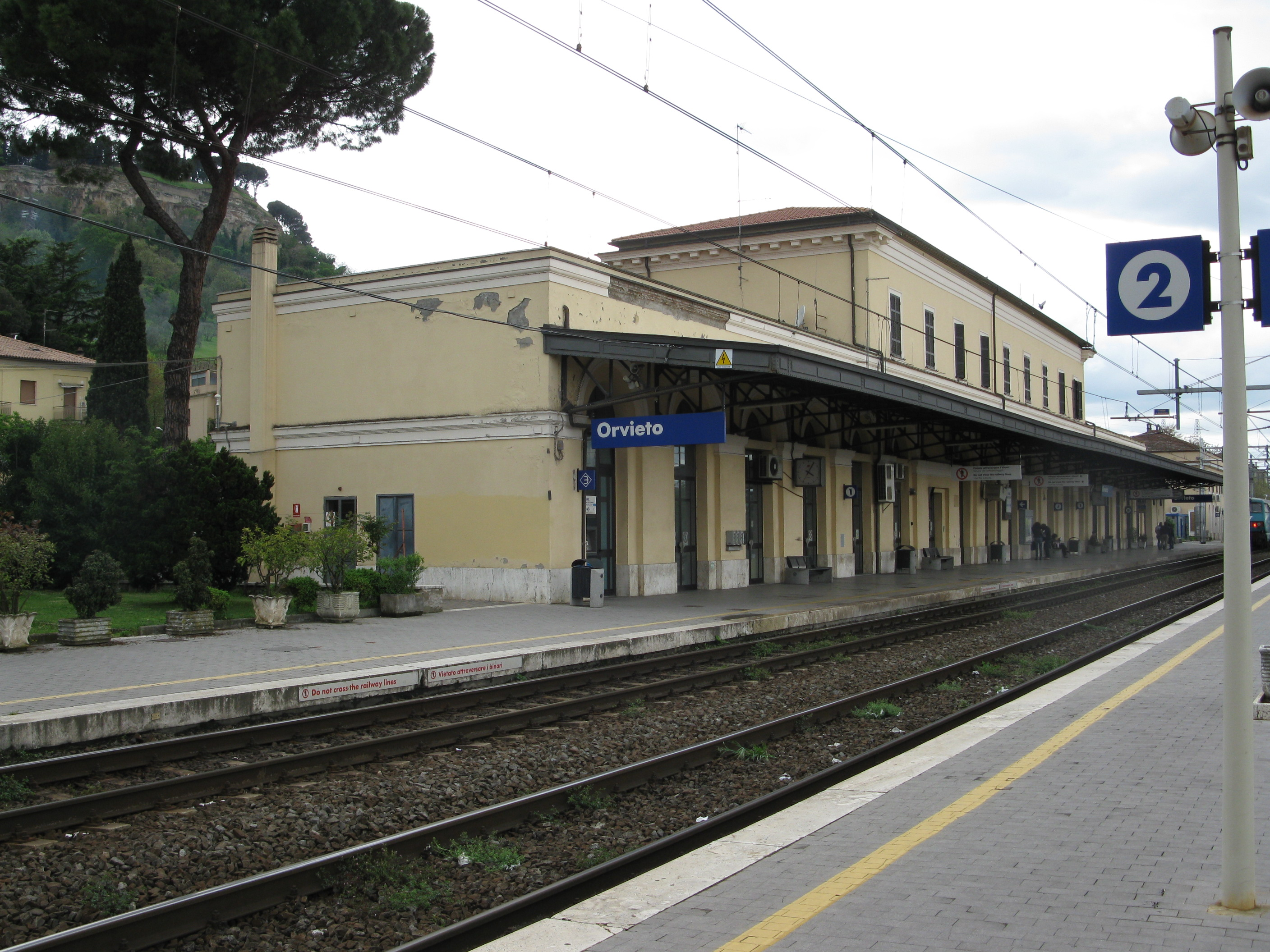
View of platforms 2 and 3

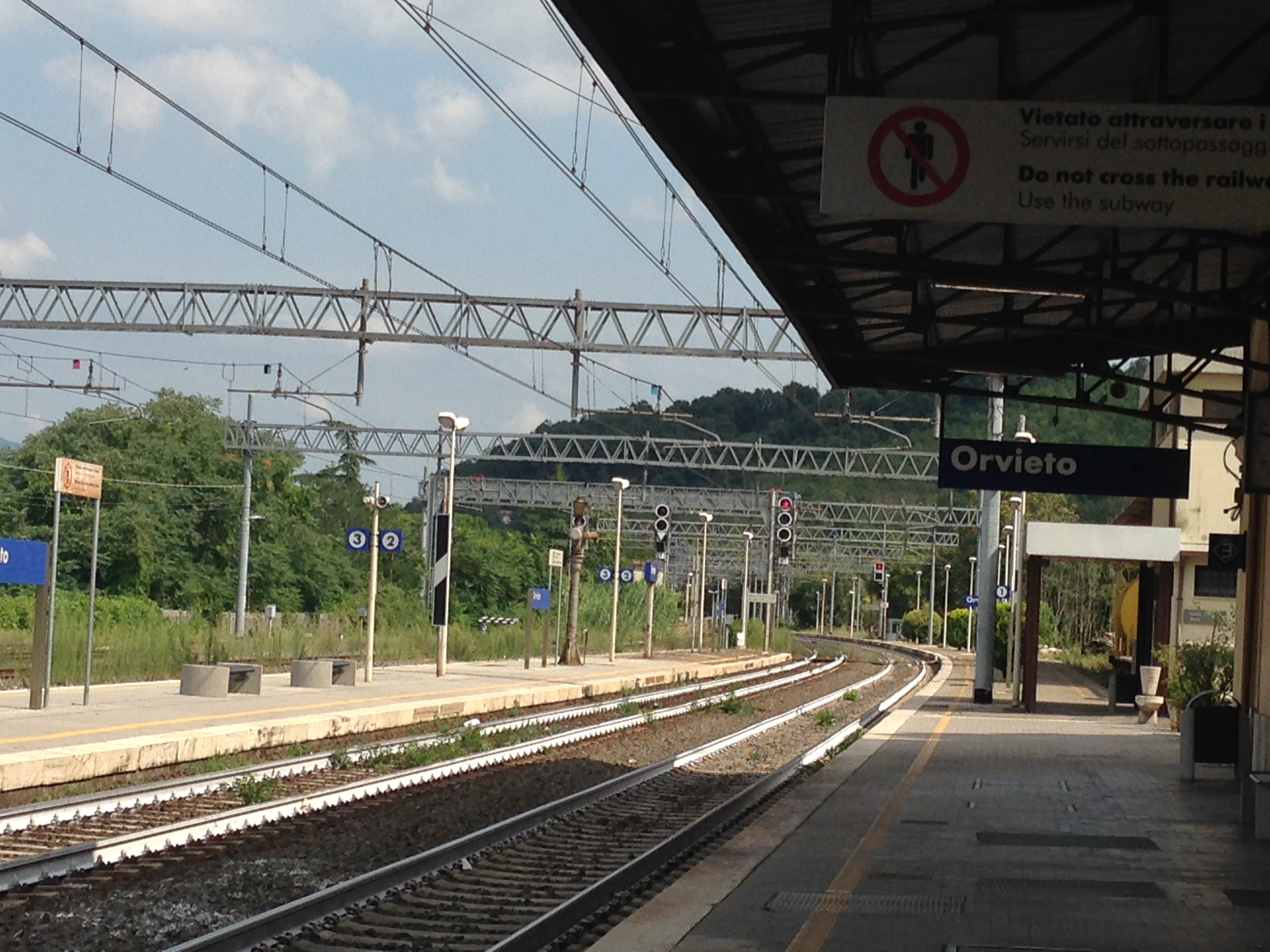
View of platforms 1 and 2 towards Rome

The station has three platforms for passenger transport. The first two platforms are for normal through services while the third is used for any overtaking and for the trains that arrive and depart from Chiusi. There are also three platforms used for freight traffic, in fact the station also has a freight yard.

The platforms are connected to each other by an underpass and a lift.

The station is very close to the Orvieto North and Orvieto south links with the Florence–Rome high-speed railway. Soon after the opening of the new line, these two links were frequently used by long-distance services that stopped at Orvieto. With the increase in the number of trains on the high-speed line, the Intercity services have been relegated to the historic line in order not to congest the high-speed line.

The low terminal of the Orvieto Funicular is located across the station forecourt.

== Rail services ==
The passenger service is operated exclusively by Trenitalia, a subsidiary of the Ferrovie dello Stato. All regional services and almost all InterCity and EuroNight trains stop at the station.

== Station services ==
The station is managed by RFI, which classified it in 2008 in the silver category. It has:

- ticket counter
- ticket machines
- waiting room.
- toilets
- bar
