= Siena–Chiusi railway =

Railway line in Italy

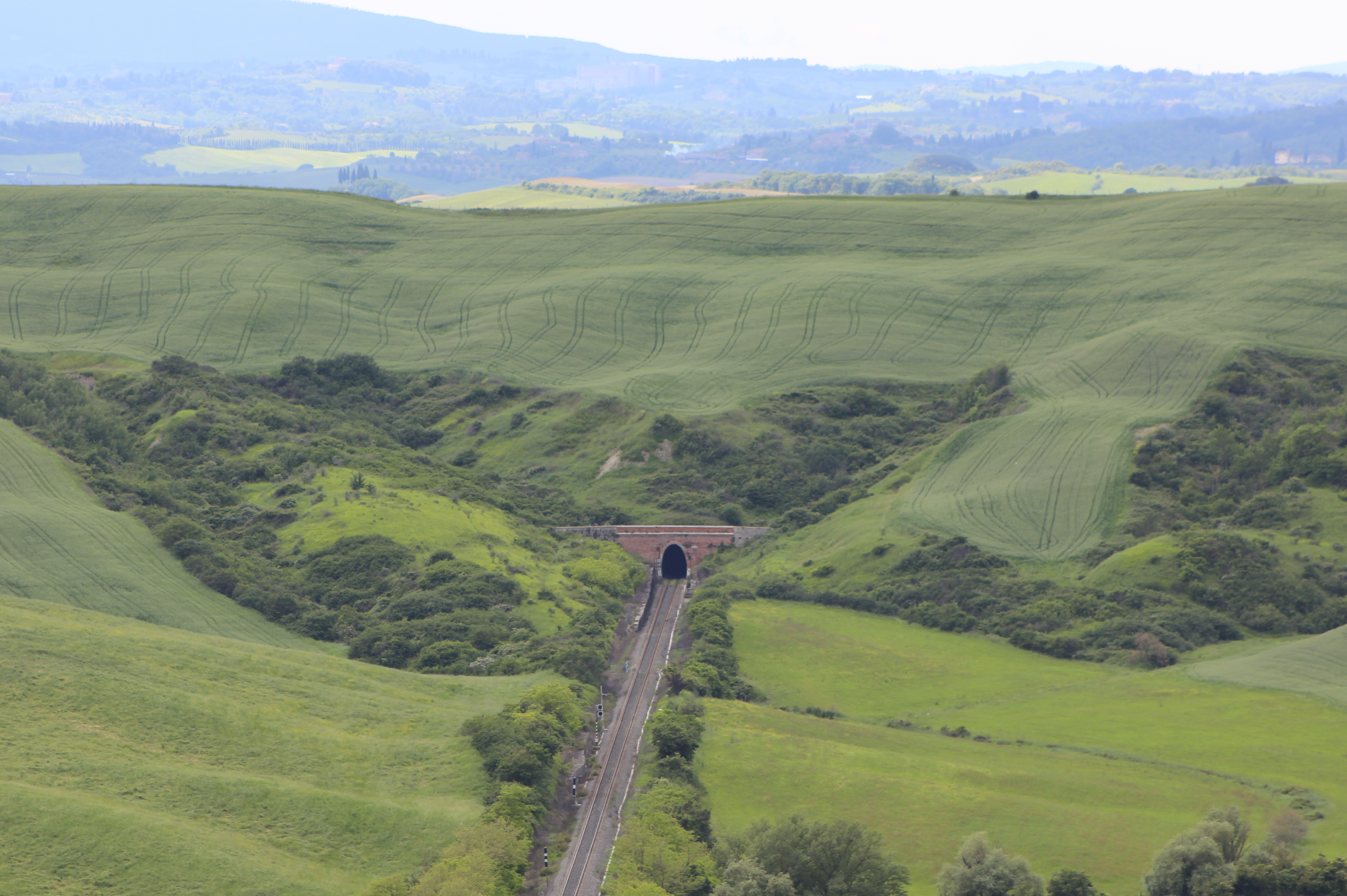

Overview
- Status: in use
- Owner: Rete Ferroviaria Italiana
- Locale: Tuscany, Italy
- Termini: Siena; Chiusi

Service
- Type: Heavy rail
- Operator(s): Trenitalia

History
- Opened: 24 July 1862

Technical
- Line length: 89 km (55 mi)
- Number of tracks: 1 (Siena–P.M. Montallese); 2 (P.M. Montallese–Chiusi)
- Track gauge: 1,435 mm (4 ft 8 1/2 in) standard gauge
- Electrification: P.M. Montallese–Chiusi
- Operating speed: 140 km/h (87 mph)

The Siena–Chiusi railway is a railway line in Italy.

It is currently managed by Rete Ferroviaria Italiana, which considers it a complementary line. It is not electrified and single track from Siena to Montallese. The Montallese–Chiusi section forms part of the Chiusi Nord junction of the Florence–Rome high-speed railway and was rebuilt during its construction. The passenger service is provided by Trenitalia.

== History ==
Section	Opened
Siena–Sinalunga	19 September 1859
Sinalunga–Torrita	29 October 1860
Torrita–Salarco	20 October 1861
Salarco–Chiusi	24 July 1862

=== The construction of the line ===
In 1851, the company obtained a concession for the extension of the line along the Chiana Valley and started designing the section from Siena to Chiusi. The first stone was laid on 20 May 1854: the Siena–Sinalunga section (58 km) was inaugurated five years later, on 11 September 1859, and operations commenced on 19 September. The Sinalunga–Torrita di Siena section (7 km) was opened on 29 October 1860.

In August 1861, the company obtained an authorisation from the Italian government to continue the Siena–Chiusi line towards Orvieto to connect with the Roma–Foligno line near Orte. The Torrita di Siena–Salarco section (6 km) was opened on 20 October 1861. Salarco station was located near a stream of the same name in the locality of Sciarti, in Abbadia di Montepulciano. An iron bridge with two spans was built to cross the stream—hence the locality is called Ponte di Ferro (iron bridge)—near a monumental brick waterfall (La Serra) built by the engineer Alessandro Manetti in 1849, during land reclamation work in the area. The characteristic nineteenth-century bridge was destroyed during the Second World War, by retreating German troops on 30 June 1944.

It was decided to build a railway yard in the middle of the Val di Chiana to convey the agricultural production of the three most important farms of the Grand Duchy of Tuscany in the area: Abbadia di Montepulciano, Chianacce and Acquaviva di Montepulciano. Salarco–Chiusi section (20 km) was opened on 24 July 1862, while the Chiusi–Ficulle section was opened on 15 December of the same year.

=== From the conventions of 1865 to the establishment of the Ferrovie dello Stato ===
Under law no. 2272 of 14 May 1865, which reorganised the railway networks in Italy, the concessionary company of the Central Tuscany railway was incorporated into the Società per le strade ferrate romane (Roman Railways), which took over the management of the line and took over the completion of the line to Orte, as well as the construction of a branch from Asciano to Grosseto, completed in 1872. On 24 August 1867, Giuseppe Garibaldi travelled on the line on the last afternoon train and, coming from Rapolano Terme, he stopped at Salarco station, where some police notables were waiting for him and accompanied him by carriage to Montepulciano. (Note: Report of the Prefect of Siena to Rome of 26 August 1867)

== See also ==
- List of railway lines in Italy

== Bibliography ==
- RFI - Fascicolo Linea 98
