= Monte Antico railway station =

Railway station in Italy

Monte Antico
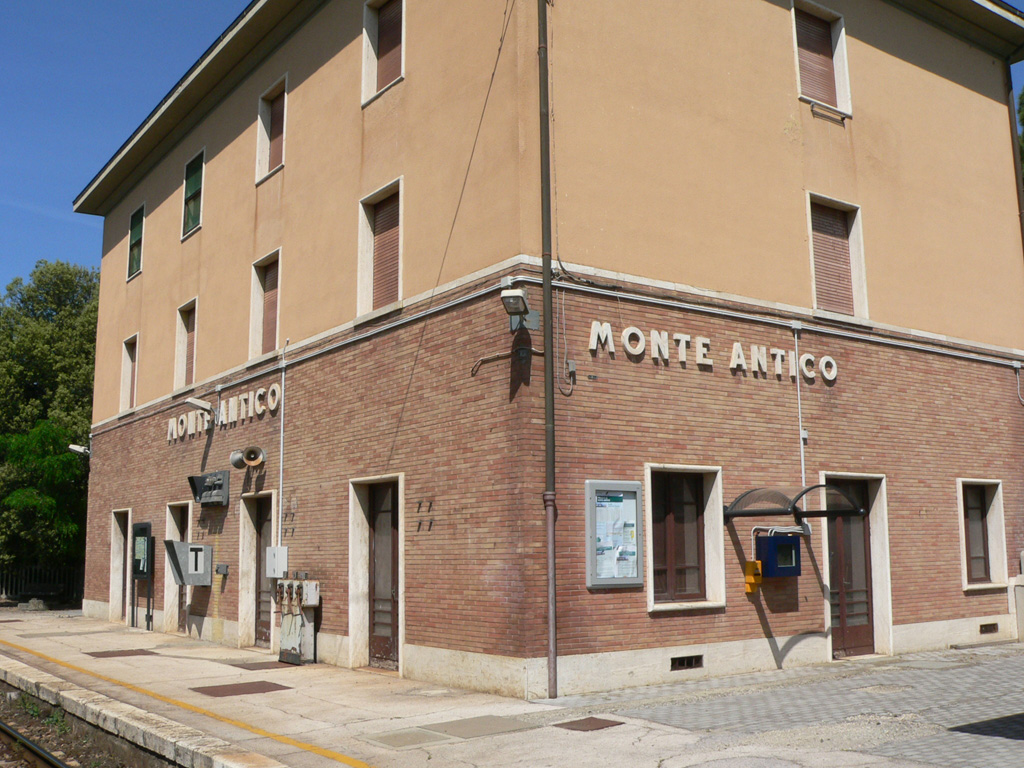
- View of the passenger building

General information
- Location: Strada Provinciale Leopoldina; Monte Antico GR 58045; Civitella Paganico, Grosseto, Tuscany; Italy
- Coordinates: 42°58′58″N 11°21′49″E
- Operator: Rete Ferroviaria Italiana; Trenitalia
- Lines: Siena-Grosseto; Asciano-Monte Antico
- Distance: 232.437 km (144.430 mi) from Roma Termini

Other information
- Classification: Bronze

History
- Opened: 15 June 1872; 154 years ago
Location
- Location within Tuscany Location within Italy

Monte Antico railway station is an Italian railway station on the Siena-Grosseto railway line in Monte Antico, Tuscany.

== History ==
From 1872 to 1927 it was an intermediate station on the original Siena-Grosseto line via Asciano, and from 1927 it has served as a junction for this line and its quicker connection via Buonconvento. The original line via Torrenieri to Asciano closed to regular passenger services in 1994, and since 1996 has served tourist trains. The original line and station were constructed by the Società per le Strade Ferrate Romane. Since 1955 both lines and the station have been operated by FS and recently by its subsidiary Trenitalia that runs the trains. From 1966 to 1980 both lines were closed due to extreme damage caused by floods, during which the line was upgraded and modernised.

== Train services and movements ==
Regular passenger services to the station are regionale services, which run daily to Grosseto and Siena and in early mornings and evenings to Empoli and Florence. The station is served by Treno Natura steam or diesel historical trains that run occasionally for tourists.

== Gallery ==
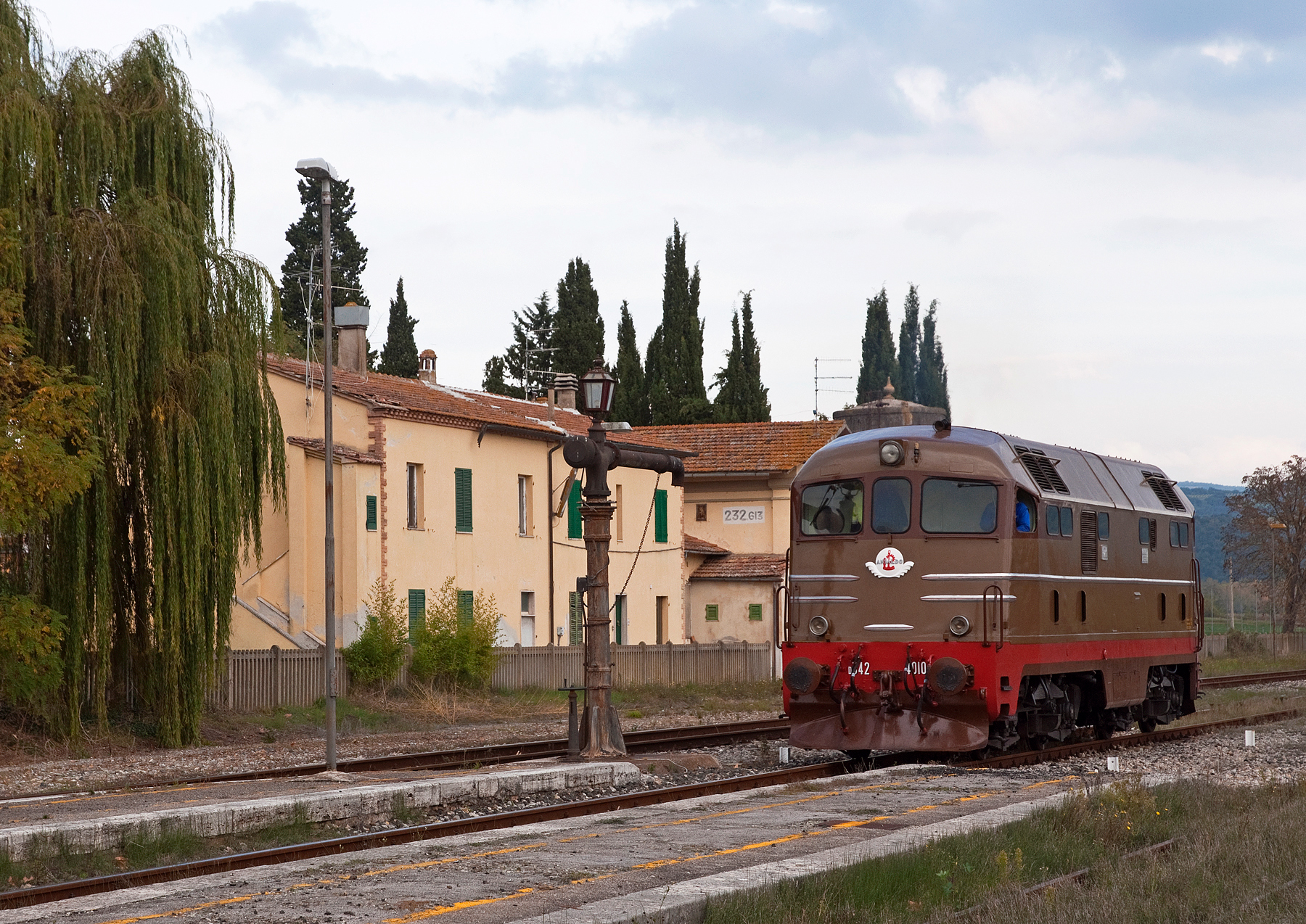
Heritage diesel locomotive on a photo charter.

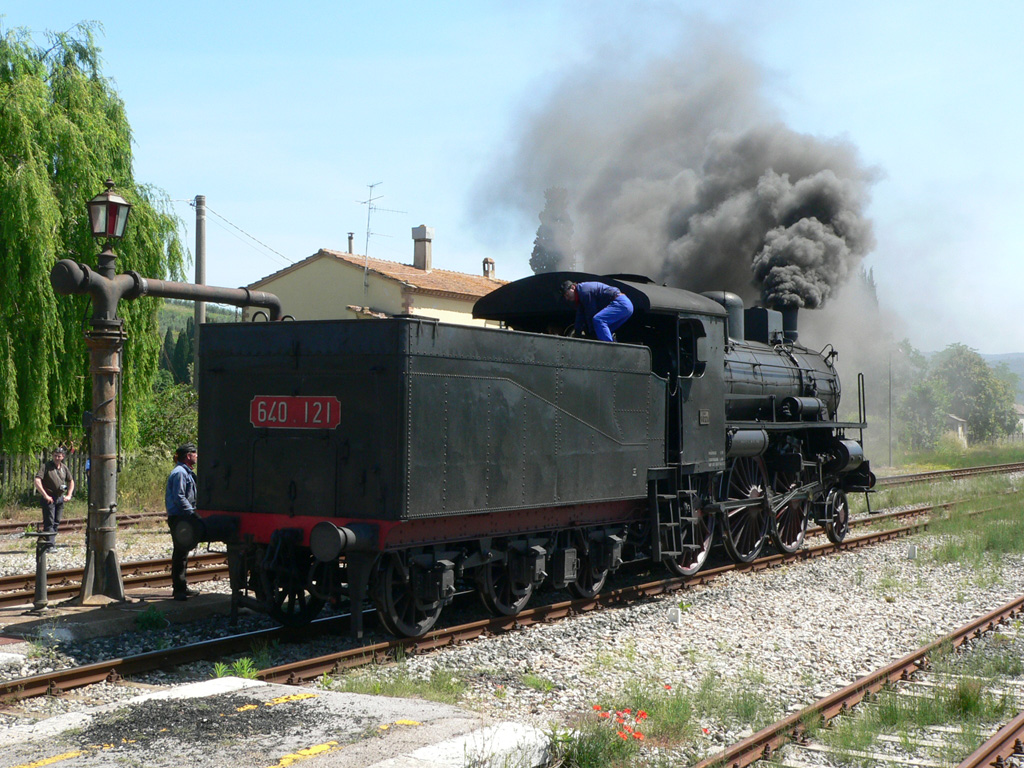
Heritage steam locomotive filling up with water on a Treno Natura service.

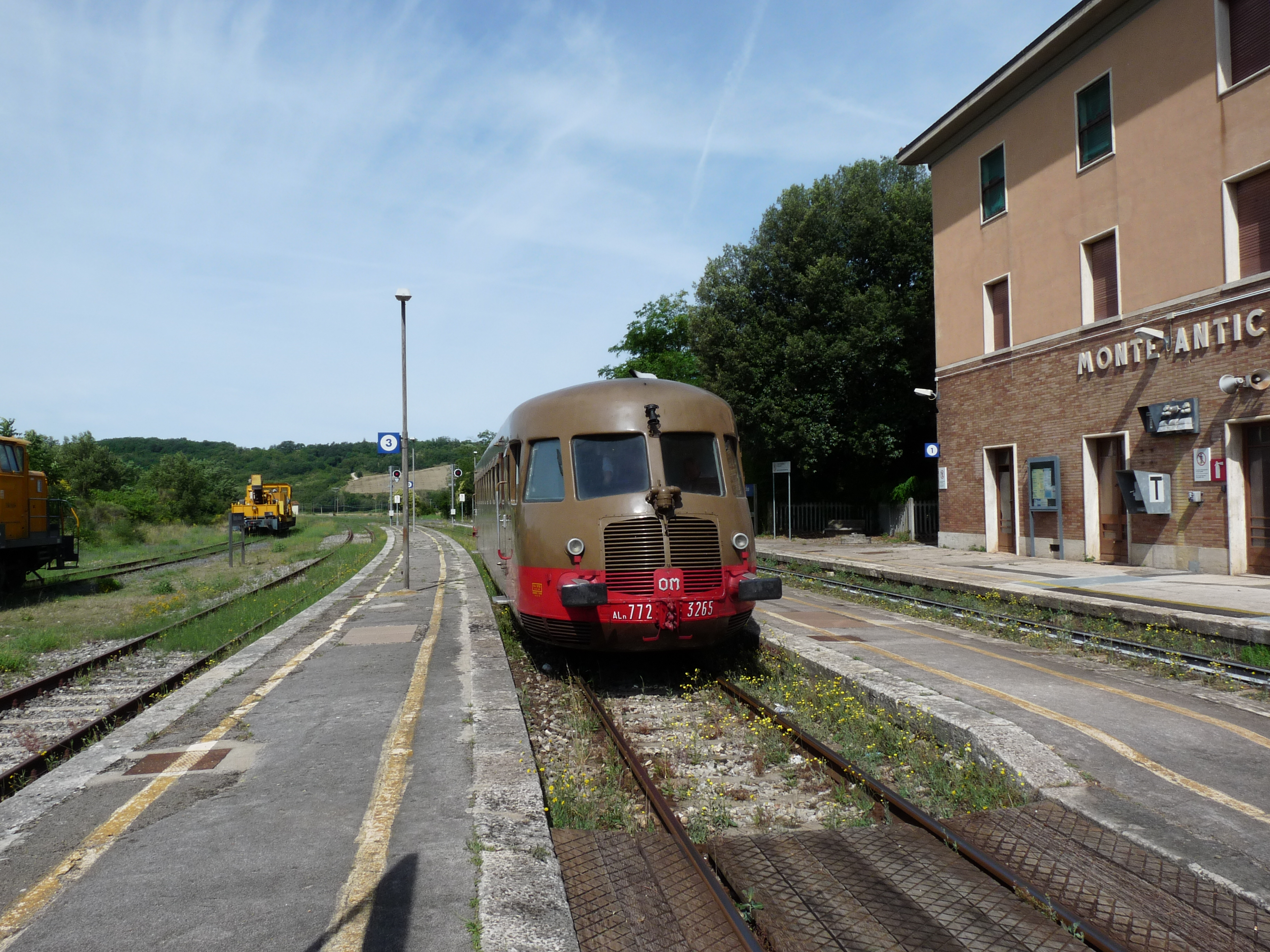
Heritage diesel railcar standing on platform 2.

== See also ==
- History of rail transport in Italy
- List of railway stations in Tuscany
- Rail transport in Italy
- Railway stations in Italy
