= Chiusi–Chianciano Terme railway station =

Railway station in Italy

Chiusi–Chianciano Terme
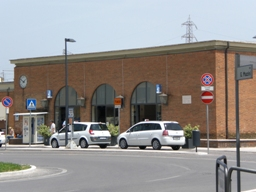
- Station building

General information
- Location: Piazza Dante, Chiusi Scalo; Chiusi, Tuscany, Italy
- Coordinates: 43°00′09″N 11°57′28″E
- Operator: Rete Ferroviaria Italiana
- Lines: Florence–Rome; Empoli–Siena–Chiusi
- Tracks: 4
- Train operators: Trenitalia

Other information
- Classification: Silver

History
- Opened: 24 July 1862; 164 years ago
- Electrified: 1935; 91 years ago
Location
- Location within Tuscany Location within Italy

Chiusi–Chianciano Terme railway station (Stazione di Chiusi–Chianciano Terme) is a station in Chiusi, Tuscany, Italy. It also serves Chianciano Terme, hence the name. It is located in the hamlet of Chiusi Scalo, on the Florence–Rome railway, at the junction with the line from Siena. Its buildings and infrastructure is managed by Rete Ferroviaria Italiana, which classified it in 2008 in the silver category.

== History ==
Chiusi station was opened with the extension of the line from Empoli and Siena to Chiusi on 24 July 1862. The line was extended to Ficulle on 15 December 1862 and to Orvieto on 27 December 1865. It was extended to Orte on 10 March 1874 and with the opening of the Chiusi–Terontola cutoff on 15 November 1875, the new line and the line south of the station became part of the Florence–Rome railway.

The modest original station building, which was destroyed during the Second World War, was replaced by a modernist building at the end of the war, opened in 1947.

== Buildings and infrastructure ==
Within the Siena area, the station plays an important role, both for its strategic position at the junction between the two lines, and because it is connected with the Florence–Rome high-speed railway by the Chiusi North and Chiusi South interconnections.

All the regional trains on the Florence–Chiusi and Florence–Rome routes stop there (most of them run at regular intervals as a result of the progressive introduction of the Memorario timetable) and the regional trains to and from Siena terminate there; in addition, numerous long-distance trains stop, mostly Intercity services.

The station has seven platforms for passenger trains, plus many others reserved for the transit of goods and the storage of trains. Generally platforms 1 and 2 are used as terminus for the regional services of the line from Siena, while the platforms 3 and 4 are used by long-distance trains running on original Florence–Rome line, while the more remote platforms are used by other regional services that start or terminate.

The passenger building has a waiting room with ticket office, newsstand and information panels on arriving and departing trains, it is equipped with an underpass with new lifts to access the seven platform tracks. Furthermore, there is a large railway police station adjacent to the station building.

== Station services ==
The station is managed by RFI, which classified it in 2008 in the silver category. It has:

- ticket counter
- accessibility for the handicapped
- bus terminus
- bar
- passenger subway
- lifts
- newsstand
- toilets
