= Florence–Rome railway =

Railway line in Italy

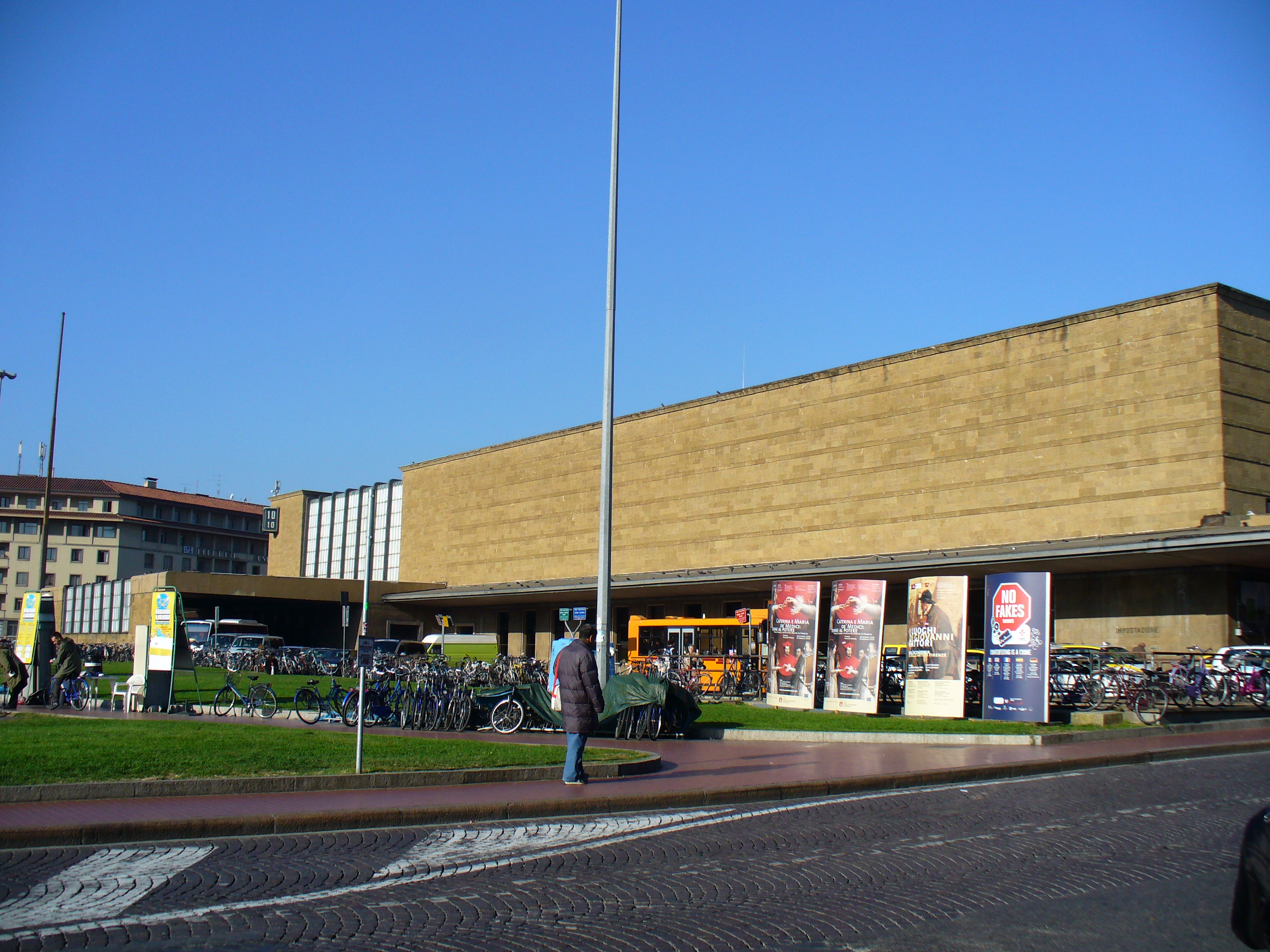
- Florence Santa Maria Novella railway station

Overview
- Status: Operational
- Line number: 92
- Locale: Italy (Florence)
- Termini: Firenze Santa Maria Novella; Roma Termini
- Stations: 10

Service
- System: Ferrovie dello Stato (FS)
- Operator(s): Ferrovie dello Stato

History
- Opened: 1866

Technical
- Line length: 314.8 km (195.6 mi)
- Number of tracks: Double track
- Track gauge: 1,435 mm (4 ft 8 1/2 in) standard gauge
- Electrification: Electrified at 3000 V DC

The Florence–Rome railway is part of the traditional main north–south trunk line of the Italian railway network. The line is referred to by Ferrovie dello Stato (the State Railways) as the Linea Lenta (meaning "slow line", abbreviated LL) to distinguish it from the parallel high-speed line. The Linea Lenta is now mainly used for regional services, for the InterCity services — rather than the faster Le Frecce trains — between Florence and Rome and for the majority of freight trains. Some types of passenger train are routed on the line to serve smaller stations not served by the high-speed line or in order to improve traffic flow during peak periods or other periods of congestion.

High-speed trains on the Florence-Rome route use the parallel Florence–Rome high-speed line (Direttissima, meaning "most direct", abbreviated DD) which was partially opened on 24 February 1977 and completed on 26 May 1992.

== History ==
Section	Opened
Florence–Pontassieve	20 September 1862
Chiusi–Ficulle	15 December 1862
Pontassieve–Montevarchi	5 April 1863
Rome–Orte	1 April 1865
Ficulle–Orvieto	27 December 1865
Montevarchi–Terontola	16 March 1866
Orvieto–Orte	10 March 1874
Terontola–Chiusi	15 November 1875

The origins of the line design date back to early days of railway building in Italy, some years before the creation of the Italian State in 1859, which explains its tortuous path and its somewhat illogical route in places. While the Apennines to the north of Florence created a difficult natural barrier, the political frontier with the Papal States to the south also obstructed the development of a rail connection with Rome. The physical and political geography led to the development of a railway line from the French border, through the Kingdom of Sardinia (Piedmont), Piacenza, and Bologna to Ancona and eventually Brindisi. At the same time the same geography led the Papal States to develop a line from Rome to Ancona. For similar reasons the Kingdom of the Two Sicilies was developing east–west rail links from Naples to Termoli, Foggia and Brindisi.

The plan for the line between Rome, Orte and Foligno, which is common to the current lines from Rome to the Adriatic port of Ancona and Florence as far as Orte, took shape in the Papal States in 1846 shortly after Pius IX became Pope, replacing his predecessor Gregory XVI who banned railways, calling them "chemins d'enfer" (French for "ways of hell"; a play of words for "chemins de fer", French for "railways"). On 7 November 1846, the Secretary of State, authorised the construction of a railway connecting Rome to Ancona in order to reach Bologna and Modena, and connecting with the railway of Lombardy–Venetia then part of the Austrian Empire. The route chosen generally followed an ancient Roman Road, the Via Flaminia through Orte and continued over the Apennines via the pass of Fossato. A concession was granted in May 1856 to a company called Ferrovia Pio Centrale (Central Pius Railway) in honour of the Pope. It was completed only ten years later and inaugurated on 29 April 1866 by the Kingdom of Italy. The project, including the sections already built, had already been absorbed in 1865 by the Società per le strade ferrate romane (Roman Railway Company).

Meanwhile, the project had inspired the Grand Duchy of Tuscany to build a railway to connect Florence with the Roman Railway Company's line. The route chosen for the railway was the natural route through the valley of the Arno to Arezzo and then continuing towards Perugia to the border with the Papal States. The concession was signed by the Grand Duchy in 1859 and confirmed by the new provincial government of Tuscany—which had just been absorbed into the Kingdom of Italy—on 24 March 1860. The company led by Augusto Pietro Adami and Adriano Lemmi, both from Livorno, obtained reconfirmation with a dictatorial decree signed by Garibaldi in Caserta on 25 September 1860. On 7 July 1861, Act 96 of the Kingdom of Italy gave legislative approval for the concession to the Società delle Ferrovie Livornesi (Livornese Railway Company) to carry out construction work already started for a strada ferrata da Firenze per Arezzo fino all'incontro di quella da Roma ad Ancona ("railway from Florence via Arezzo to that from Rome to Ancona"). The resulting line was very long and tortuous while being very useful for many formerly isolated towns and villages. The first section of slightly less than 20 kilometres between Firenze Santa Maria Novella and Pontassieve was opened by the Livornese Railway Company on 20 September 1862. In the spring of 1863 the line from Florence reached Montevarchi and was completed to Terontola on 16 March 1866. The line from Terontola to Foligno was opened in December 1866, completing the link between Florence and Rome via Perugia.

On 15 December 1862, the Società per la Ferrovia Centrale Toscana (the Central Railway Company of Tuscany)—which had the concession for the line from Empoli to Siena—opened an extension of the line from Chiusi–Chianciano Terme station to Ficulle and on 27 December 1865 the line reached Orvieto. An extension to Orte on 10 March 1874, together with the Chiusi–Terontola cutoff, allowed the shortening of the route. Meanwhile, following the reorganisation of the railways under Law No. 2279 of 14 May 1865 the Livornese Railway Company and the Central Railway Company of Tuscany were merged into the reconstituted Roman Railway Company.

=== Chiusi–Terontola cutoff ===
On 2 November 1864 the final section of the Porrettana line opened between Pistoia and Pracchia, reducing the travel time over the Apennines between Florence to Bologna from 14 hours (by road) to only 5 hours. This fact together with the transfer of capital of the Kingdom from Turin to Florence moved the main traffic flow from the Ancona route to the new line to Florence. However, it was quickly realized that it was inadequate and obsolete especially after the transfer in 1870 of Italy's capital to Rome, which meant that most trains now travelled on the line. While the journey included many curves through beautiful landscape and the ancient towns of Narni, Terni, Spoleto, Assisi and Perugia, in 1871 it meant that a train leaving Florence at 8.05 arrived in Rome at 17.40, that is it took 9 hours 35 minutes to cover 372 km. It was therefore decided to shorten the route by bypassing Perugia. On 15 November 1875 a new cutoff was opened between Chiusi–Chianciano Terme and Terontola across generally flat land west of Lake Trasimeno, shortening the line by about 58 kilometers and avoiding the tortuous line through Perugia, which was reduced to being a secondary line. During the reorganisation of the railways in 1885, the line became part of a new concession, the Società Italiana per le strade ferrate meridionali (Italian Company for the Southern Railway)—known as the Rete Adriatica (Adriatic Network)—which had its headquarters in Florence.

=== Upgrades ===
The line was originally built as a single track and operated with steam traction; it was doubled in stages and then electrified at 3000 volts DC in 1935. However, the line remained slow, not allowing travel at over 100 km/h. After World War II work started on a project—which had been partly developed before the war—for the quadrupling of certain sections of the line that were already approaching saturation. In the early 1960s work slowly started on its implementation, which had developed into a project consisting of a new line with advanced features and a number of interconnections making possible the operation on the same track of both high-speed trains and trains stopping at intermediate stations. The new line is now known as the Direttissima.

== Route ==
The current route connects the stations of Firenze Santa Maria Novella and Roma Termini via Arezzo, Terontola, Chiusi and Orvieto with a total length of 314 km. It follows the valleys of the Arno, the Paglia and the Tiber rivers. The index of tortuosity, according to UIC standards is very high at 68%, which is determined in large part by the presence of five major curves: Fara Sabina, Orte, Ficulle, Arezzo and Pontassieve. Because of the reduced radius curves for 40/50% of the line, the maximum speeds are not more than 95–105 km per hour.

The line is double track and electrified at 3,000 volts direct current and has interconnection with the Direttissima at:

- Valdarno North
- Valdarno South
- Arezzo North
- Arezzo Sud
- Chiusi North
- Chiusi South
- Orvieto North
- Orvieto South
- Orte North
- Orte South

The integration of fast and slow trains on the two double lines, known as Linea Alta Velocità/Alta Capacità (high speed/ high capacity line, AV-AC) is similar to that adopted for high-speed lines in Germany.

== See also ==
- List of railway lines in Italy
