= Orvieto Funicular =

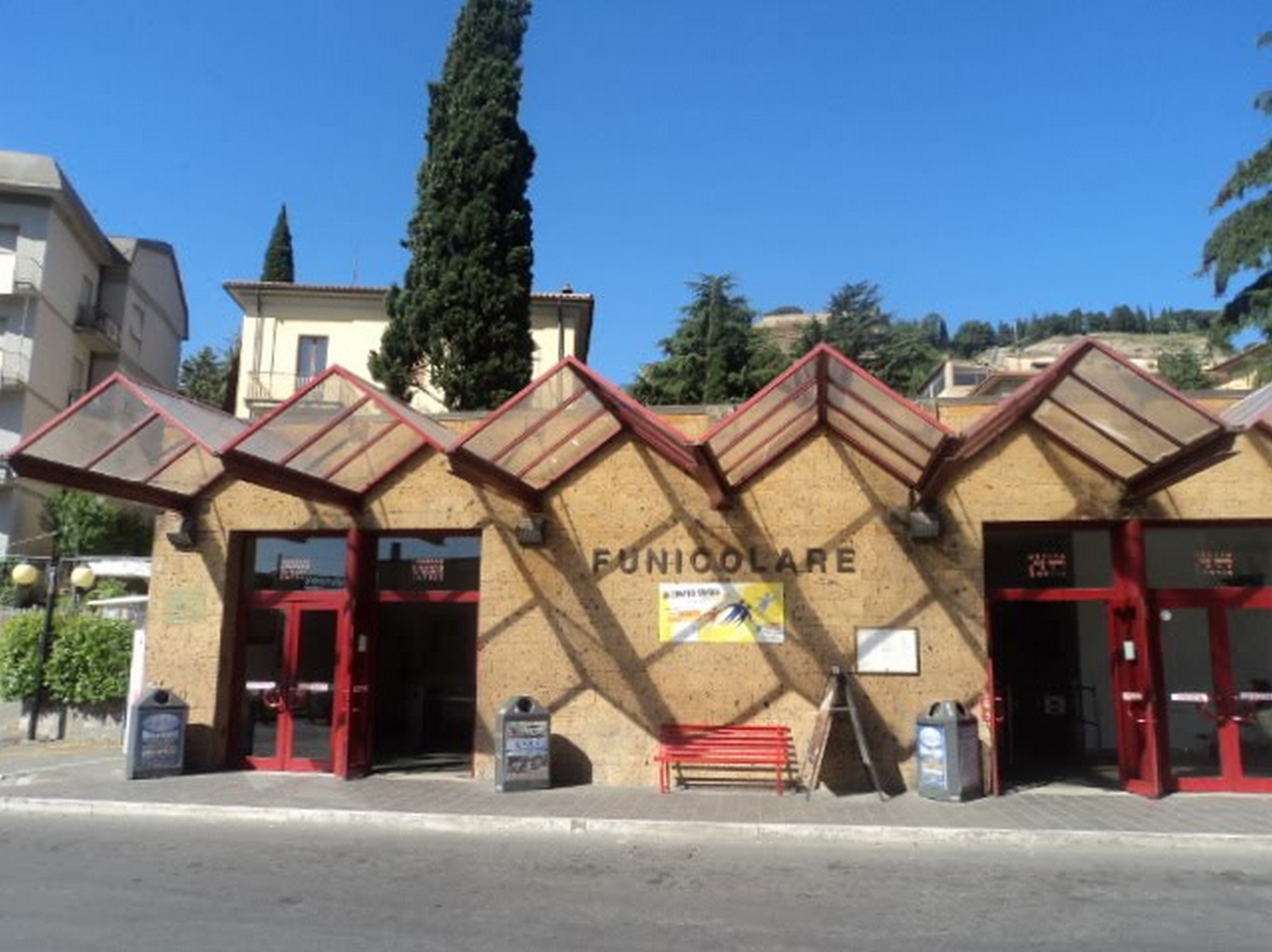
- The lower station

Service
- Type: Funicular

History
- Opened: 1888

Technical
- Line length: 580 metres (1,903 ft)
- Track gauge: 1,445 mm (4 ft 8 7/8 in)

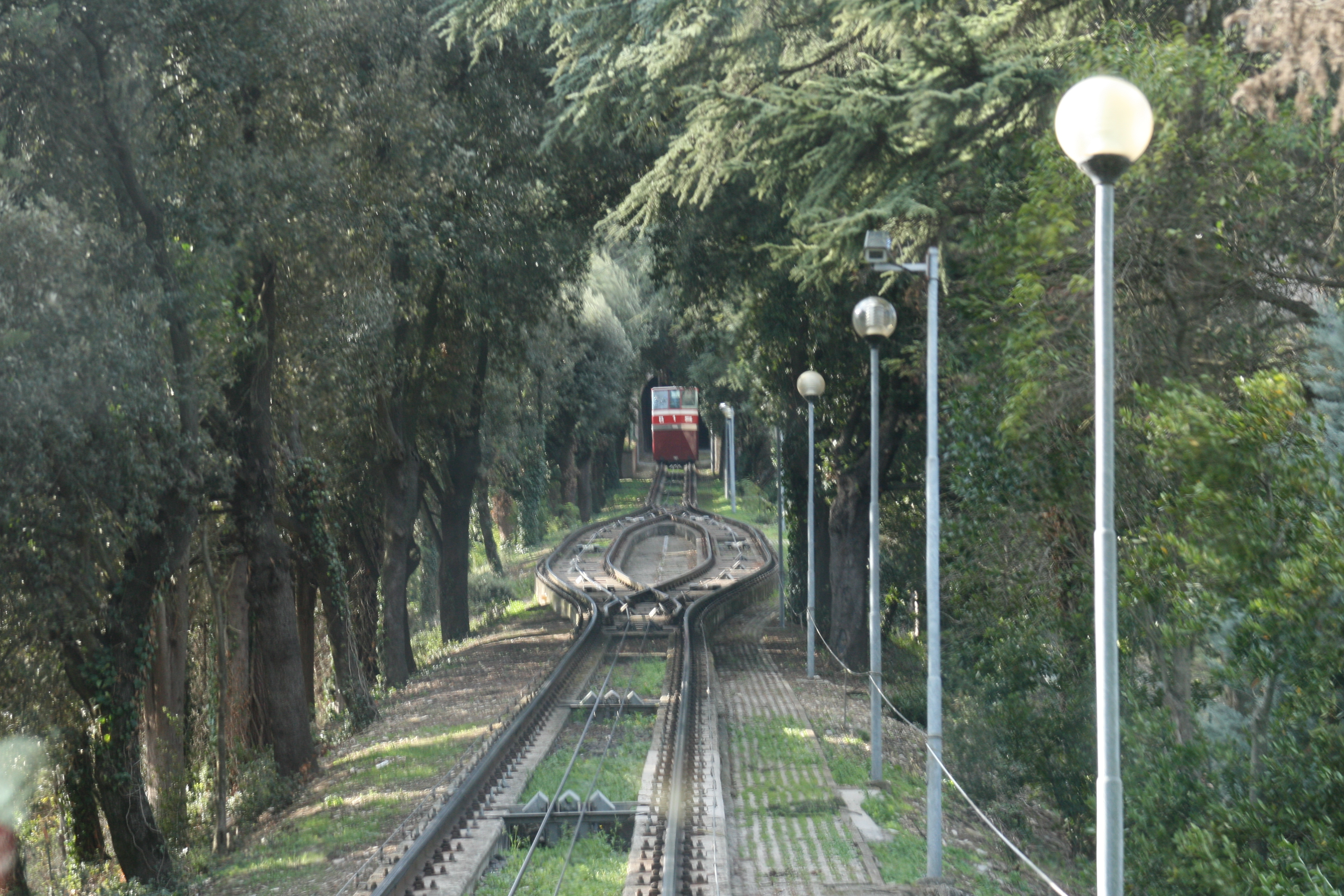
Looking up the funicular

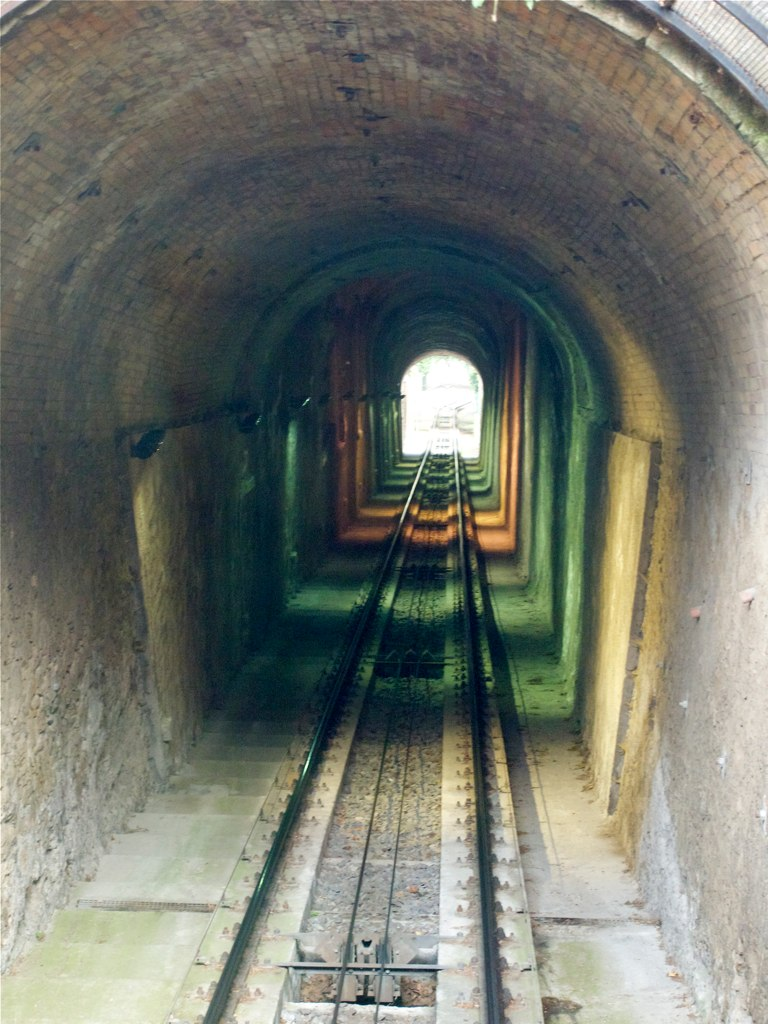
Looking down the tunnel under the ramparts

The Orvieto Funicular (Italian: Funicolare di Orvieto) is a funicular railway in the Italian city of Orvieto. It connects Orvieto station with Piazza Cahen in the city centre, which is situated on a volcanic rock 157 metres (515 feet) above the station. The line passes through the rampart, which surrounds the city centre, in a tunnel.

The line was originally built in 1888, and took the form of water-ballast counterbalanced funicular. This line was in use until 1970, when it was abandoned. Twenty years later, in 1990, a new electrically hauled funicular was built on the route of the old.

The cars of the new line are unmanned, and the whole line is controlled by a single controller in the upper station. The line operates every 15 minutes, or more frequently if traffic demands it. It has the following parameters:

Number of stops	2
Configuration	single track with passing loop
Track length	580 metres (1,903 ft)
Rise	157 metres (515 ft)
Average gradient	28%
Number of cars	2
Maximum speed	6 metres per second (19.69 ft/s)
Average travel time	116 seconds
Capacity	75 passengers per car

At the upper station, the funicular connects with two routes operated by electric minibuses that serve the city centre.

== See also ==
- List of funicular railways
