= Chiusi Scalo =

- Frazione
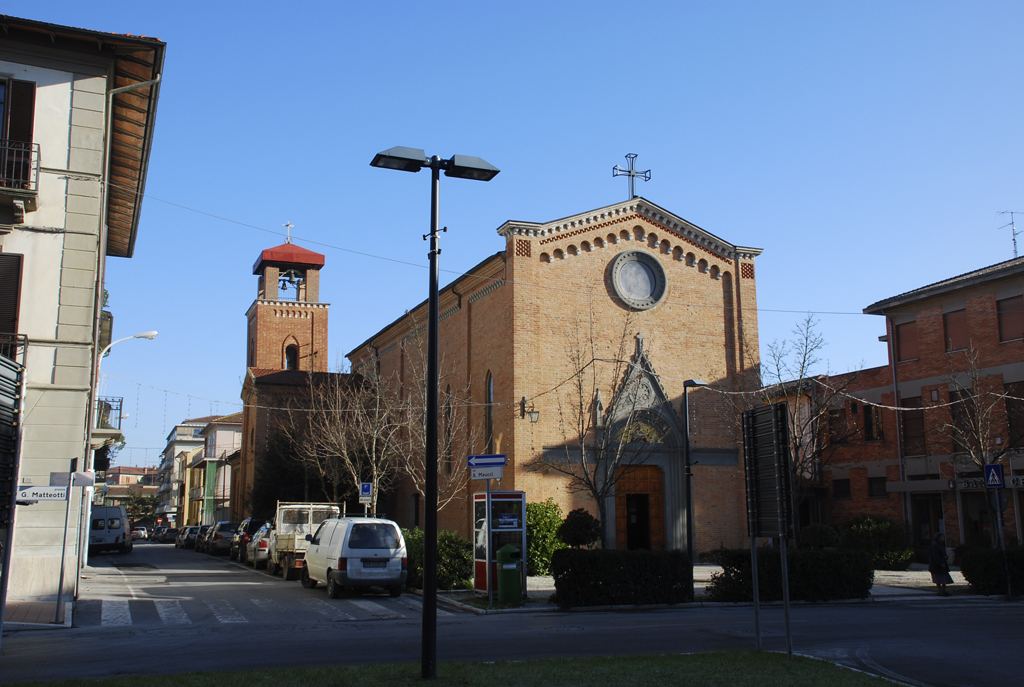
- The church of Santa Maria della Pace

- Location of Chiusi Scalo in Italy
- Coordinates: 43°00′11″N 11°57′19″E
- Country: Italy
- Region: Tuscany
- Province: Siena (SI)
- Comune: Chiusi
- Elevation: 252 m (827 ft)

Population (2011)
  - Total: 4,061
- Time zone: UTC+1 (CET)
  - Summer (DST): UTC+2 (CEST)

Chiusi Scalo is a village in Tuscany, central Italy, administratively a frazione of the comune of Chiusi, province of Siena. At the time of the 2001 census its population was 3,892.

== Monuments ==
=== Church of Santa Maria della Pace ===
Bishop Giuseppe Conti laid and blessed the first stone of the church on 1 August 1919, in response to the village's growing population. The church was built on land owned by the Schools for reading, writing, and arithmetic, established by Bishop Giuseppe Pannilini in 1823. Construction was completed in August 1926, and on 7 September, the church was consecrated and dedicated to Santa Maria della Pace by Bishop Conti. The church was later established as a parish in October 1930 but suffered significant damage from Allied bombings during World War II.

== Transports ==
- Chiusi–Chianciano Terme railway station
