= Asciano–Monte Antico railway =

Railway line in Italy

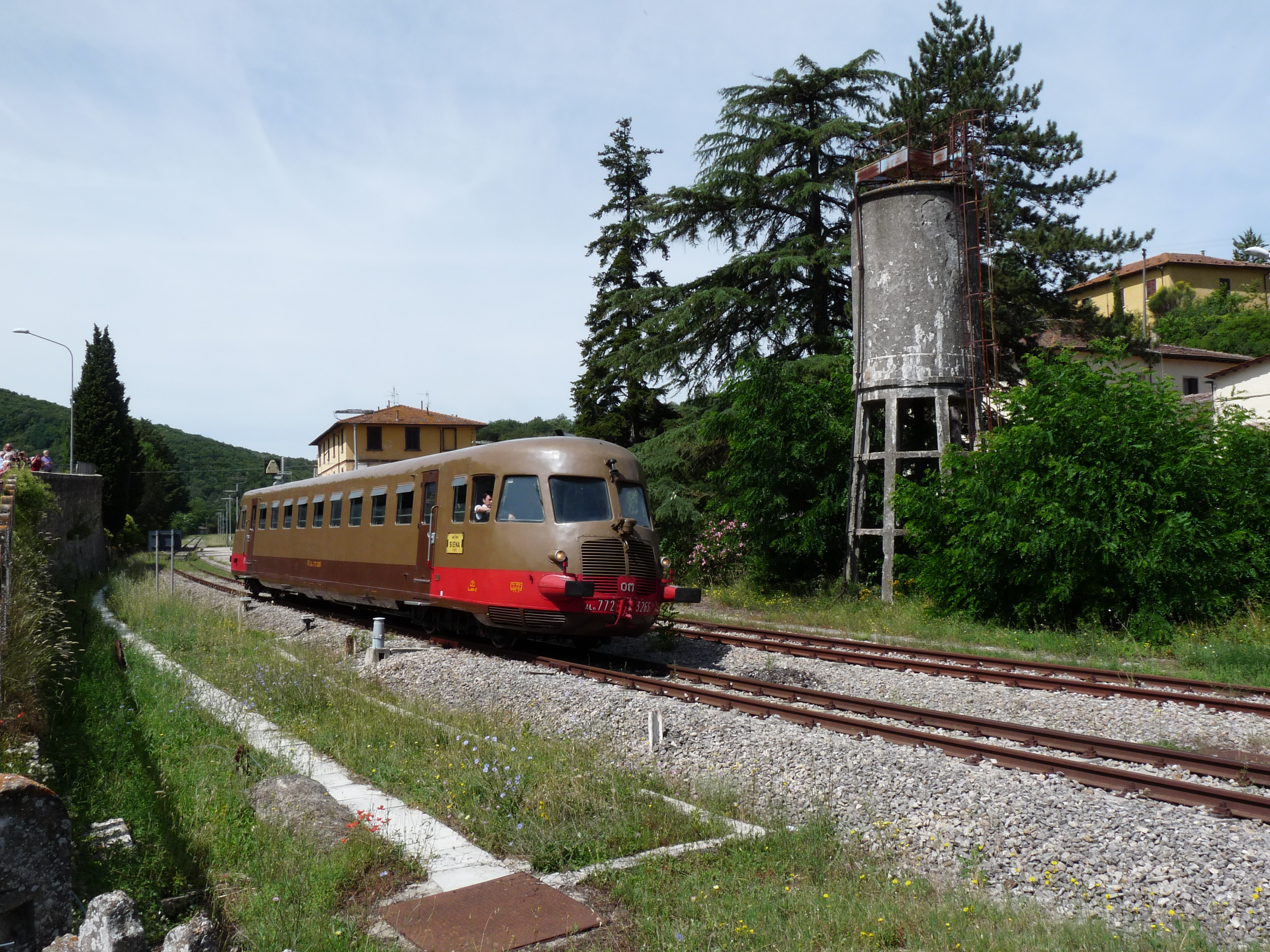
- Historic railcar departing Monte Amiata station

Overview
- Status: in use for heritage trains only
- Owner: Rete Ferroviaria Italiana
- Locale: Tuscany, Italy
- Termini: Asciano; Monte Antico

Service
- Type: Heavy rail

History
- Opened: 1872, 1996 (for tourist trains)
- Closed: 1994

Technical
- Line length: 51 km (32 mi)
- Number of tracks: 1
- Track gauge: 1,435 mm (4 ft 8 1/2 in) standard gauge
- Electrification: no
- Operating speed: 50 km/h (31 mph)

The Ferrovia Asciano–Monte Antico (Asciano–Monte Antico railway) is a railway line linking the town of Asciano to Monte Antico in the municipality of Civitella Paganico in Southern Tuscany.

== History ==
The line was planned in 1859 and constructed by the Società per le Strade Ferrate Romane as the first line to connect the cities of Siena and Grosseto. The section between Asciano and Torrenieri was the first to open, which it did in 1865. The next section, between Torrenieri and Monte Amiata, opened in 1871, and the rest was completed for 1872, when the line connecting Monte Antico to Grosseto opened.

In 1906 a plan was submitted to construct a faster line between Monte Antico and Siena and this new line was completed in 1927. The services between Asciano and Monte Antico continued to operate as well as this line.

In 1955, both lines came under the operation of the FS. During the Second World War, the line was extensively damaged. The first section to be restored was from Asciano to San Giovanni d'Asso, the rest reopening only in 1952.

In 1966, a flood washed away part of the line between Monte Amiata and Torrenieri stations, and the line remained closed until 1980 during which period various modernisation work took place. The line via Buonconvento was also damaged and also remained closed until 1980.

In 1994 the passenger uptake of the line had dwindled to a point that the government found unsustainable, and the line closed to regular passenger services. In 1996 the Treno Natura tourist heritage services began to operate on select days of the year, using historic steam and diesel locomotives and railcars. This continues nowadays.

== Gallery ==
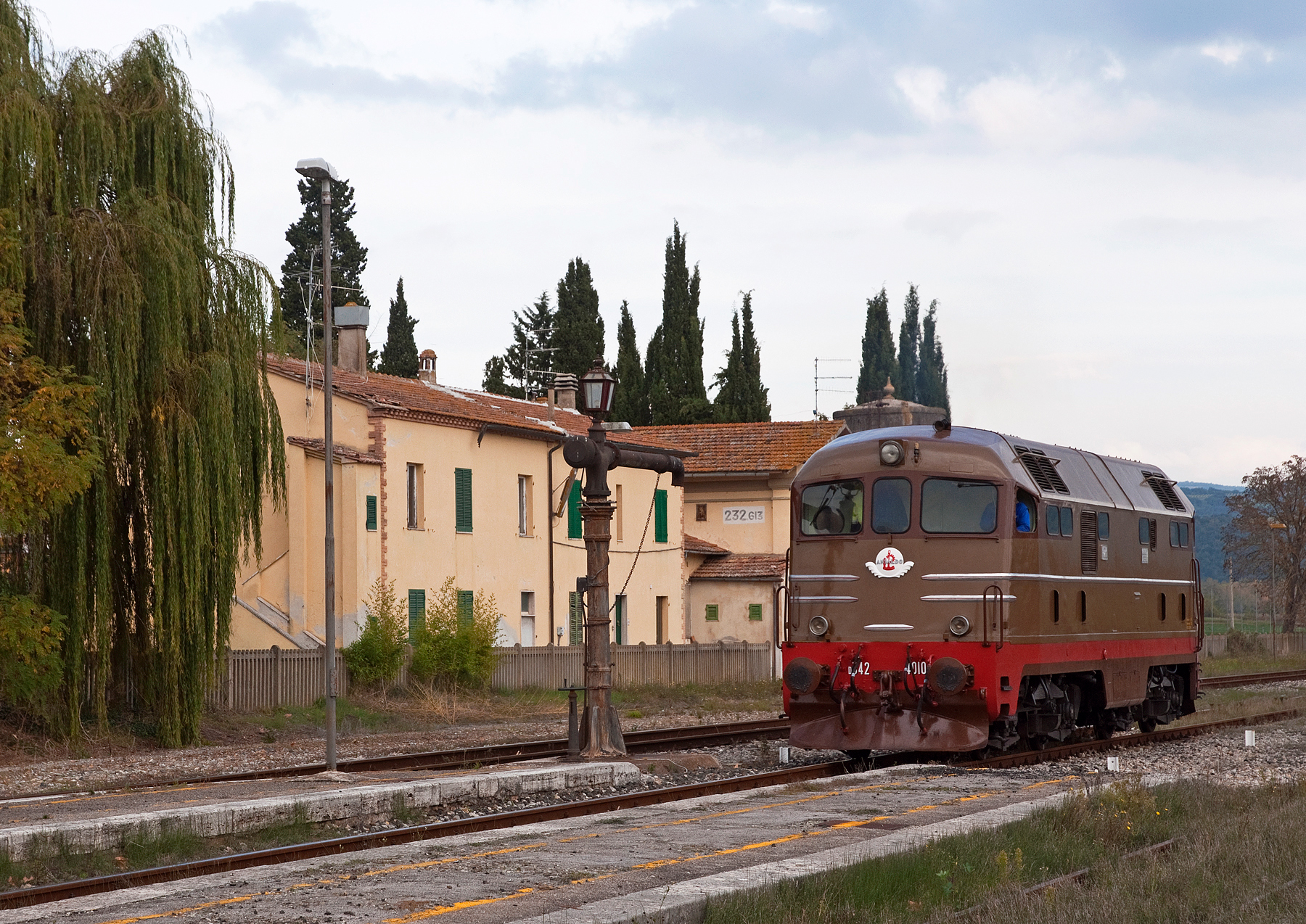
Historic diesel locomotive at Monte Antico.

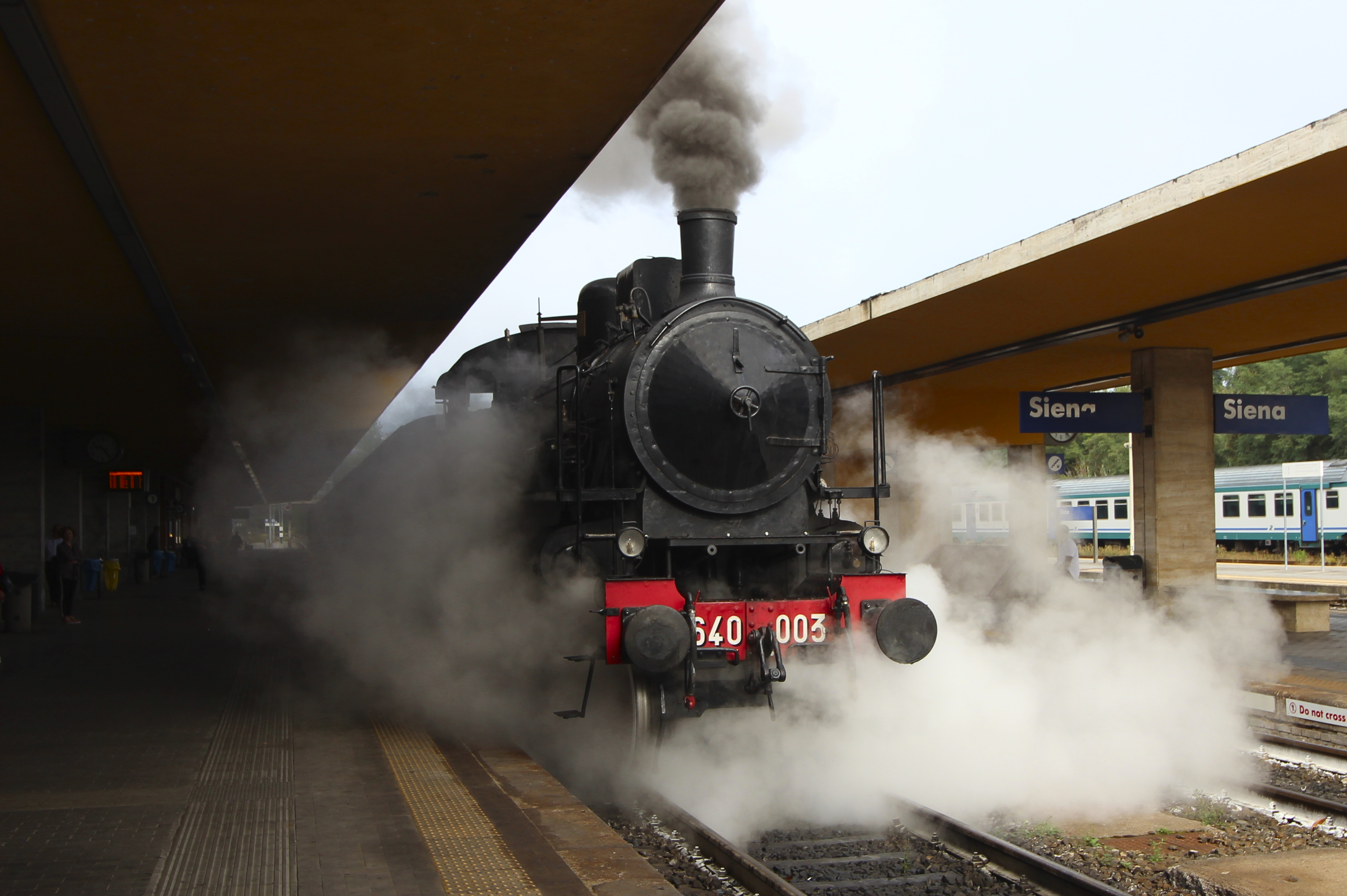
Steam locomotive departing Siena

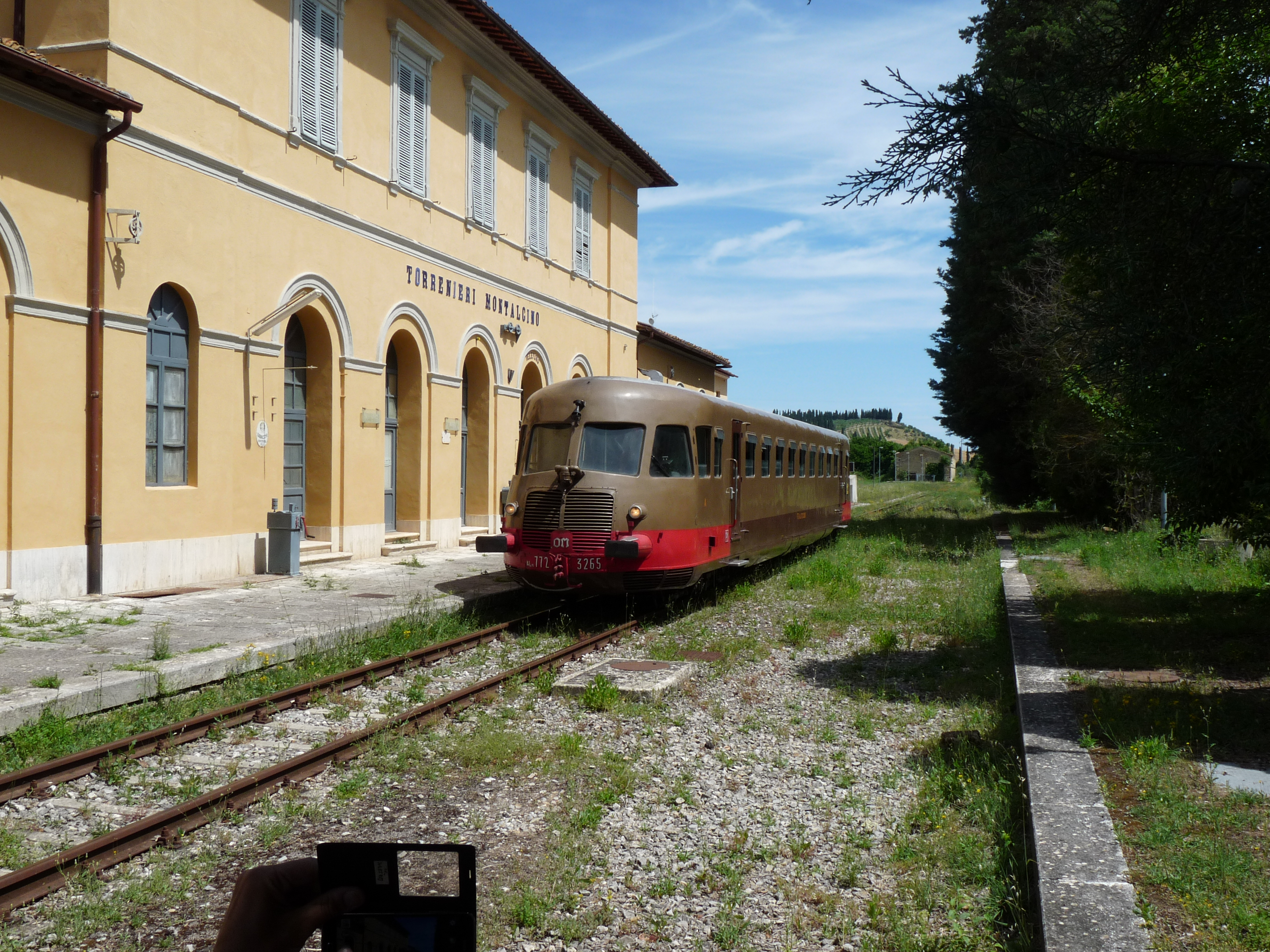
Historic diesel railcar at Torrenieri-Montalcino.

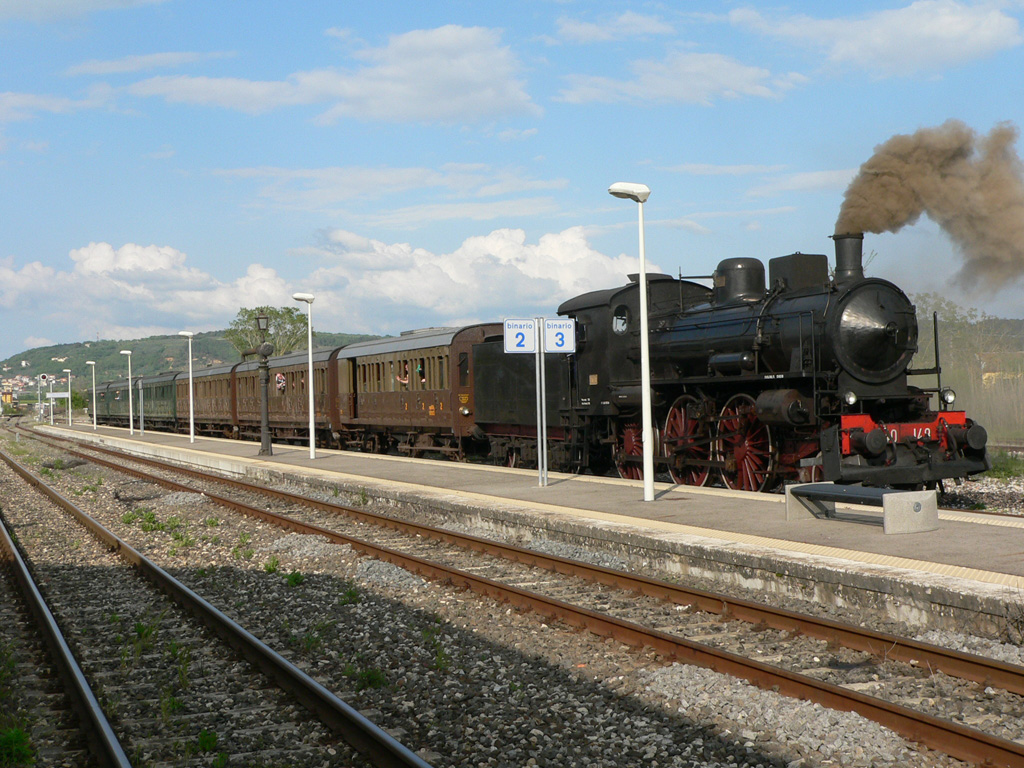
Steam locomotive arriving at Asciano.

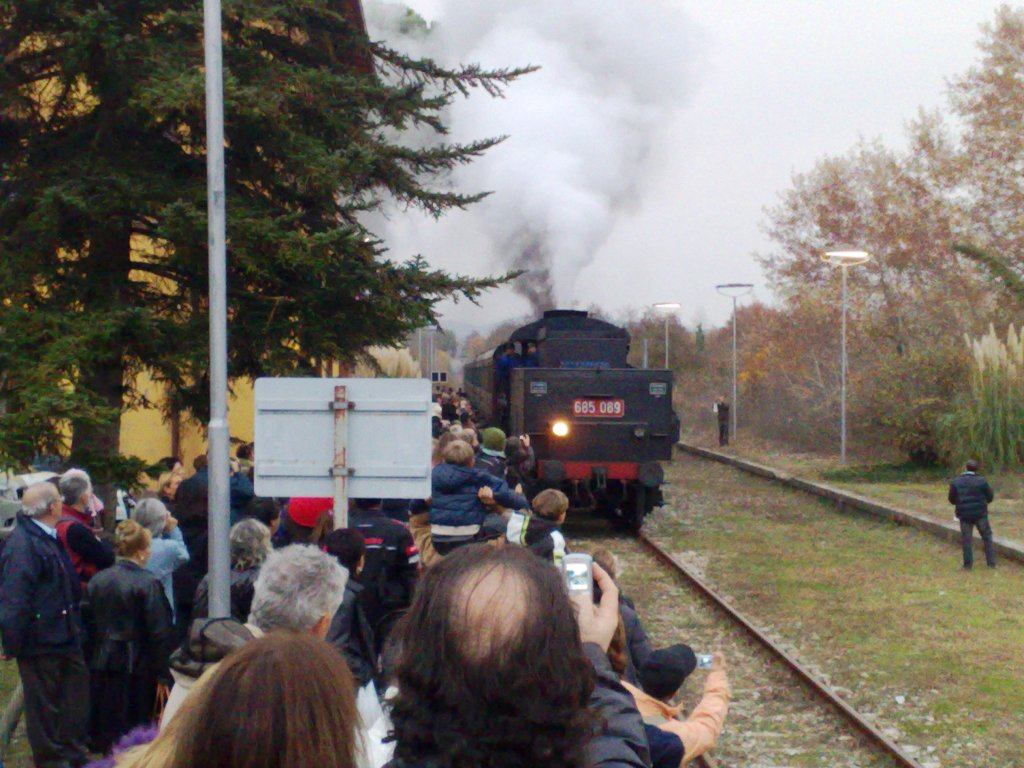
Steam locomotive arriving at San Giovanni d'Asso

== See also ==
- List of railway lines in Italy
