= Siena railway station =

Railway station in Siena, Italy

Siena
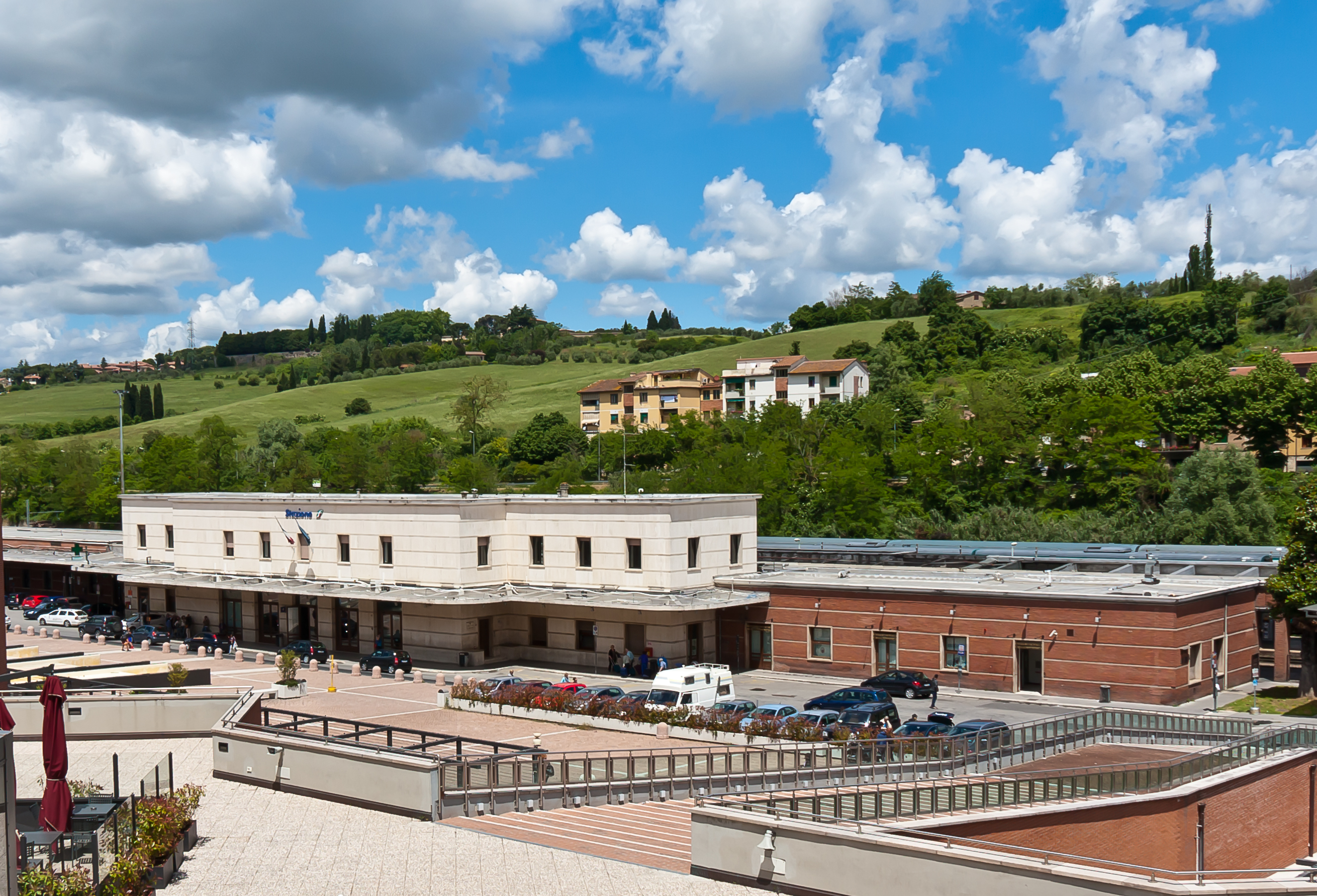
- View of the passenger building.

General information
- Location: Piazza Carlo Rosselli 7; 53100 Siena SI; Siena, Siena, Tuscany; Italy
- Coordinates: 43°19′53.9″N 11°19′22.7″E
- Operator: Rete Ferroviaria Italiana; Centostazioni
- Lines: Empoli–Siena; Siena–Chiusi; Siena-Grosseto
- Distance: 253.042 km (157.233 mi) from Roma Termini
- Train operators: Trenitalia
- Connections: Urban and suburban buses

Other information
- Classification: Gold

History
- Opened: 25 November 1935; 90 years ago
Location
- Location within Tuscany Location within Italy

Siena railway station (Italian: Stazione di Siena) serves the city and comune of Siena, in the region of Tuscany, central Italy. Opened in 1935, it is the terminus of the lines to Empoli, to Chiusi and to Grosseto via Monte Antico.

== History ==
The current station was built to an Art Deco design and was completed in 1935, replacing another station at Madonnina Rossa. It serves as the midpoint and terminating station of most trains on the Central Tuscan Railway, with current services mostly running either to Chiusi-Chianciano Terme or Empoli, a large percentage continuing to Florence SMN. The section from Siena to Empoli opened in 1849, but the sections south of Siena opened gradually: the Siena-Sinalunga section was completed in 1859, and the last section was completed over the next 3 years, meaning the line was fully completed on 24 July 1862. The line to Grosseto has had two different routes. In 1872 a line was opened from Asciano to Grosseto via Monte Antico, with trains using the Central Tuscan line from Siena before diverging at Asciano onto the new section. In 1906, a faster line was proposed, running down to Buonconvento before travelling alongside the Ombrone river to Monte Antico. This was opened in 1927. This station was opened in 1935, and has 6 platforms in operation. Platforms 1-5 are through platforms, and there is a bay platform to the north alongside platform 1, identified as platform 1 tronco. There are various sidings around the station, notably alongside the bay, where rolling stock for the historic steam and diesel Trenonatura services along the Asciano-Monte Antico line is sometimes kept.

== Services ==
All trains that serve the station are operated by Trenitalia, and most are of the regionale type, with destinations most commonly being Florence SMN, Empoli, Grosseto and Chiusi-Chianciano Terme. Historic Trenonatura steam and diesel trains that operate through the Val d'Orcia on the Asciano-Monte Antico line start their journeys from Siena on selected days of the year, first using the Siena-Grosseto line as far as Monte Antico before turning around and travelling towards Asciano.

== Operation ==
The station is currently managed by Rete Ferroviaria Italiana (RFI). However, the commercial area of the passenger building is managed by Centostazioni. Train services to and from the station are operated by Trenitalia. Each of these companies is a subsidiary of Ferrovie dello Stato (FS), Italy's state-owned rail company.

A series of escalators connects the train station with the old city on top of the hill.

== See also ==
- History of rail transport in Italy
- List of railway stations in Tuscany
- Rail transport in Italy
- Railway stations in Italy
