= Empoli–Siena railway =

Railway line in Italy

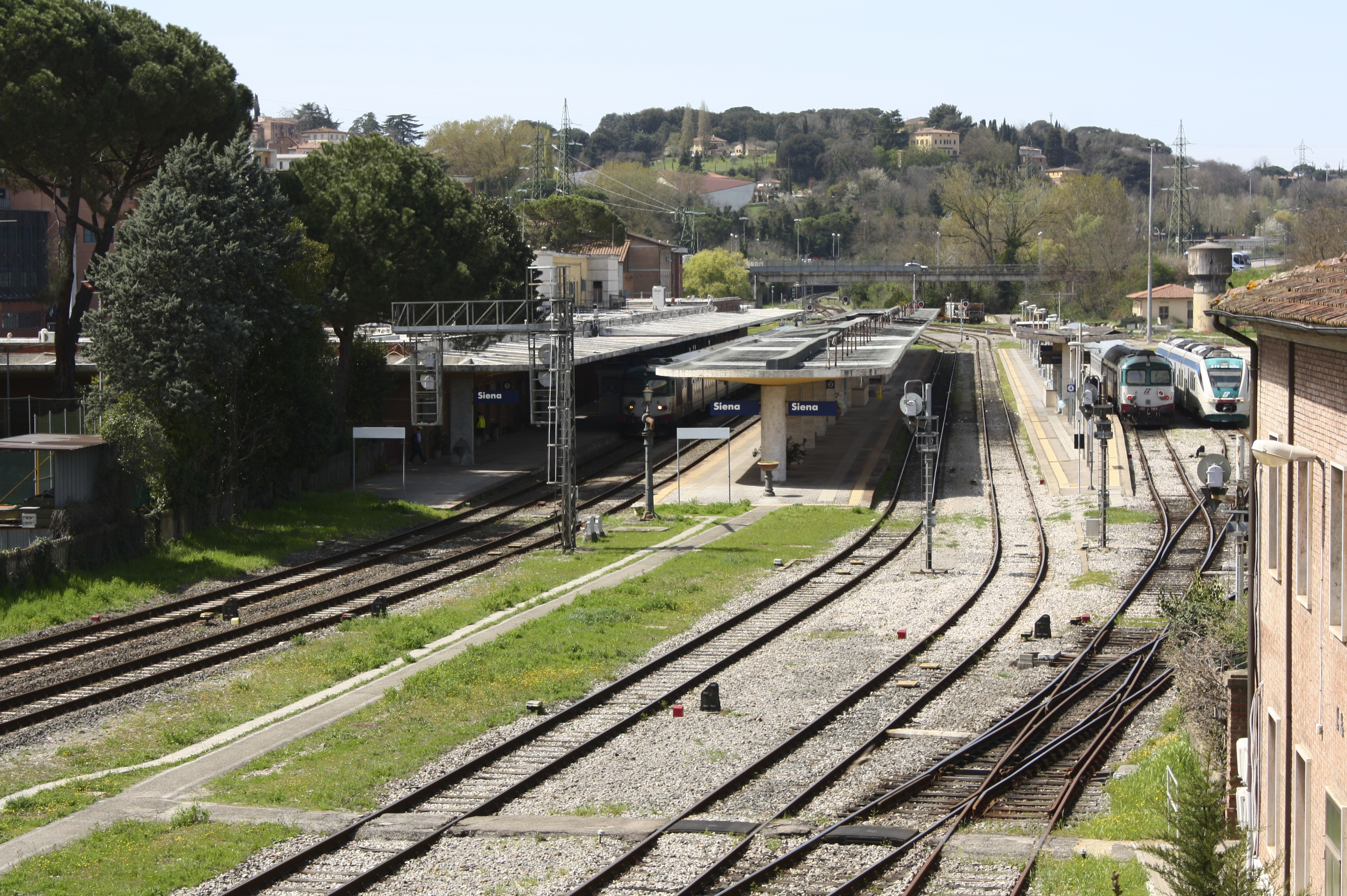
- Trains at Siena station in 2018

Overview
- Status: in use
- Owner: Rete Ferroviaria Italiana
- Line number: 98
- Locale: Tuscany, Italy
- Termini: Empoli; Siena

Service
- Type: Heavy rail
- Operator(s): Trenitalia

History
- Opened: 14 October 1849

Technical
- Line length: 63 km (39 mi)
- Number of tracks: 1 (Empoli–Granaiolo; Poggibonsi–Siena); 2 (Granaiolo–Poggibonsi)
- Track gauge: 1,435 mm (4 ft 8 1/2 in) standard gauge
- Electrification: no

The Empoli–Siena railway (formerly known in Italian as the ferrovia Centrale Toscana—Central Tuscan railway) is an Italian railway that connects Empoli and Siena. The route follows the valleys of Elsa river as far as Poggibonsi and then the Staggia stream, which were very convenient when the line was planned. The route is in fact flat and substantially straight from Empoli to Poggibonsi, then ascends with wide and long curves through the hills of central Tuscany to Siena.

It is currently managed by Rete Ferroviaria Italiana, which considers it a complementary line. It is not electrified and single track between Empoli and Granaiolo, double track between Granaiolo and Poggibonsi and again single track from Poggibonsi to Siena. The passenger service on the Empoli–Siena–Chiusi railway is carried out by Trenitalia.

== History ==
In 1840 the governor of Siena, Luigi Serristori, who had previously participated in the preliminary studies for the construction of the Leopolda Railway, promoted the construction of a railway between Florence and Siena.

The construction of the line (originally called the strada ferrata Centrale Toscana and later the ferrovia Centrale Toscana, both meaning "Central Tuscan railway" from Empoli to Orte), was financed with private capital mainly from Siena; the concessionary company of the same name was established in 1844 and obtained the concession from the Grand Duchy of Tuscany on 5 July 1845.

=== Construction and opening ===
The works, begun in 1846, were completed in a few years and the first Empoli–Siena section (64 km) was opened on 14 October 1849, although at the time of the inauguration, Montearioso tunnel, which lies a few hundred metres from Siena station, was still under construction.

This tunnel, which was a significant technical achievement at the time, is 1516 metres long and for some years it was the longest tunnel in Italy. It was dug with great difficulty in friable and moist soils and took four years and three months of work, delaying the opening of Siena station to 18 September 1850. For a year, the terminal station of the line was located in a temporary building at the northern entrance of the tunnel.

=== From the conventions of 1865 to the establishment of the Ferrovie dello Stato ===
Under law no. 2272 of 14 May 1865, which reorganised the railway networks in Italy, the concessionary company of the Central Tuscany railway was incorporated into the Società per le strade ferrate romane (Roman Railways), which took over the management of the line and took over the completion of the line to Orte, as well as the construction of a branch from Asciano to Grosseto, completed in 1872. On 24 August 1867, Giuseppe Garibaldi travelled on the line on the last afternoon train and, coming from Rapolano Terme, he stopped at Salarco station, where some police notables were waiting for him and accompanied him by carriage to Montepulciano. (Note: Report of the Prefect of Siena to Rome of 26 August 1867)

For some years the railway was of considerable importance as it was the only railway link between Rome and Northern Italy. However, starting from the mid-1870s, with the construction of the Livorno–Rome railway and the Florence–Rome railway, the Tuscan Central railway lost importance and was relegated to a more local role. The line followed the vicissitudes of the Roman Railways Company and, with the nationalisation of the company, it was taken over by the Italian State in the late 1870s and early 1880s. Another branch of the Central Tuscany railway that connected Poggibonsi to Colle di Val d'Elsa was opened in 1885. It was initially planned that this branch would continue until it reached Volterra and be connected to the Cecina–Volterra railway, but this project never proceeded.

=== The connection with the Umbrian–Aretina railway ===
The need to speed up the connections between Florence and Rome and to connect the Central Tuscany railway with the Umbrian–Aretina railway, which connected Arezzo to Terni via Perugia began to be considered in the 1870s. To go from the old to the new capital of the Kingdom of Italy, it was necessary to take a very long route via Bucine, Arezzo, Tuoro sul Trasimeno, Perugia, Foligno and Orte. Eleven projects were presented for the new railway line: the first of these involved branching off the Central Tuscany railway at Salarco, crossing the entire Val di Chiana diagonally from south-west to north-east and reaching the Umbrian–Aretina railway near Bastardo, one of the thirteen farms of the former Grand Duchy in the valley, located 7 km north of Arezzo.

Other proposals considered included the following routes: Chiusi–Terontola, Salarco–Castiglion Fiorentino, Salarco–Olmo, Acquaviva di Montepulciano–Cortona, Salarco–Bucine (36.10 km long with an estimated cost of lire 3,200,000) and Buoninsegna–Bucine (which would have branched off the Central Tuscan railway at Rapolano Terme). In August 1871, the Acquaviva di Montepulciano–Cortona project was surveyed: the new railway line would have been built over a distance of 20 km through the Chiuso and Selva valleys, with the construction of two tunnels (Apparita and Barullo) and a total cost of lire 2,250,000.

In the end, the Chiusi–Terontola project was selected: the cost of a line that would connect Chiusi with Terontola was estimated at around 2,000,000 lire. In the spring of 1874, the first excavation works began, despite the opposition voiced by the districts that would have benefitted from the rejected projects.

=== After nationalisation ===
With the nationalisation of the railways, the management of the line passed to Ferrovie dello Stato in 1905. It completed the new Siena–Grosseto railway in 1927. This branches off from the main railway south of Siena station and crosses Tuscany to the south and joins the Asciano–Grosseto railway at Monte Antico station. The Arezzo–Sinalunga railway, which branched off the Central Tuscany railway north of Sinalunga and reached the city of Arezzo crossing the Val di Chiana for 40 km, was completed three years later, in 1930.

A second track was completed on the section from Granaiolo to Castelfiorentino, including the new Cambiano station in 1990. The section from Castelfiorentino to Certaldo was completed a few years later. In autumn 2004, work began on doubling the section from Certaldo to Poggibonsi, which was completed on 20 June 2006; during this phase some level crossings were also eliminated and the track layout was rationalised.

On 24 October 2018, the Transport Committee of the Chamber of Deputies agreed to the expenditure of €177 million to carry out a substantial renewal of the line: work to double the Empoli–Granaiolo section would start by 2021, while the line would be electrified from Empoli to Siena.

== Standards ==
The railway is 63 km long, is not electrified and is almost entirely single-track, except for the Granaiolo–Poggibonsi, which is double-track.

=== Infrastructure ===
==== Siena station ====
On 25 November 1935, the current Siena station was inaugurated, located on a new route from the southern exit of the Montearioso tunnel that followed a route that is down hill from the city and north of it, compared to the old route. The opening took place at midnight on the previous 28 October, a symbolic date for the Fascist regime as the anniversary of the March on Rome; at the same time, both the old station and the old section of the Empoli–Siena line were closed.

The new station was designed by the architect Angiolo Mazzoni, who had already built a large series of public buildings in the 1920s and 1930s. The passenger building, externally finished in brick and travertine, has architectural features typical of Italian Rationalism. The old station of Siena was located closer to the city walls and at a higher altitude: it was in fact located at 312.70 m above sea level, at chainage 256.457 km. (Note: Rete Mediterranea data) The passenger building is now partly used as a private residence and partly as a barracks for the State Forestry Corps.

== See also ==
- List of railway lines in Italy
