= Torrenieri =

- Frazione
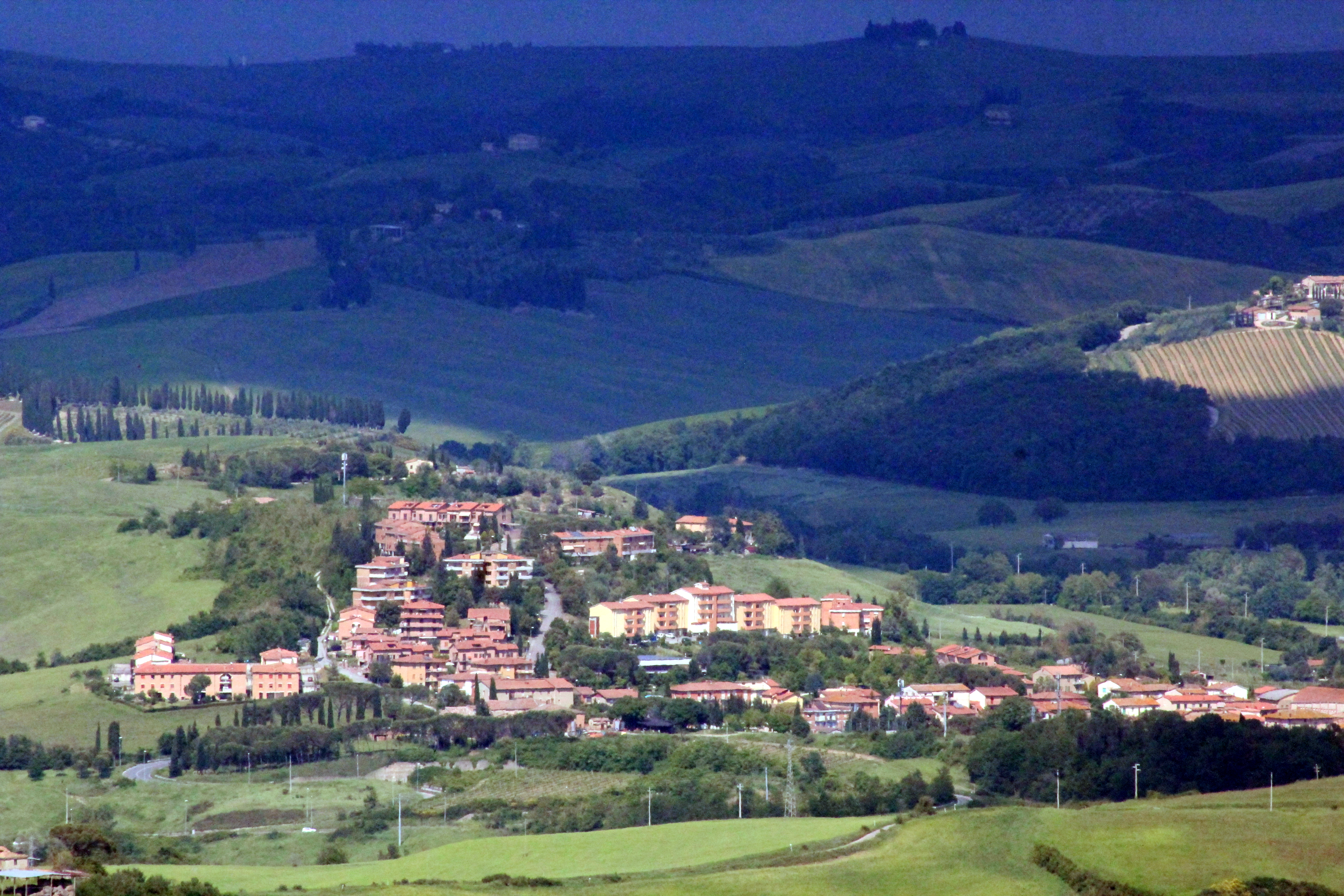
- View of Torrenieri

- Location of Torrenieri in Italy
- Coordinates: 43°5′15″N 11°32′53″E
- Country: Italy
- Region: Tuscany
- Province: Siena (SI)
- Comune: Montalcino
- Elevation: 258 m (846 ft)

Population (2011)
  - Total: 1,342
- Time zone: UTC+1 (CET)
  - Summer (DST): UTC+2 (CEST)

Torrenieri is a town in Tuscany, central Italy, administratively a frazione of the comune of Montalcino, province of Siena. At the time of the 2001 census its population was 1,239.
