= Florence–Rome high-speed railway =

Key central Italian transport link

Direttissima Firenze–Roma
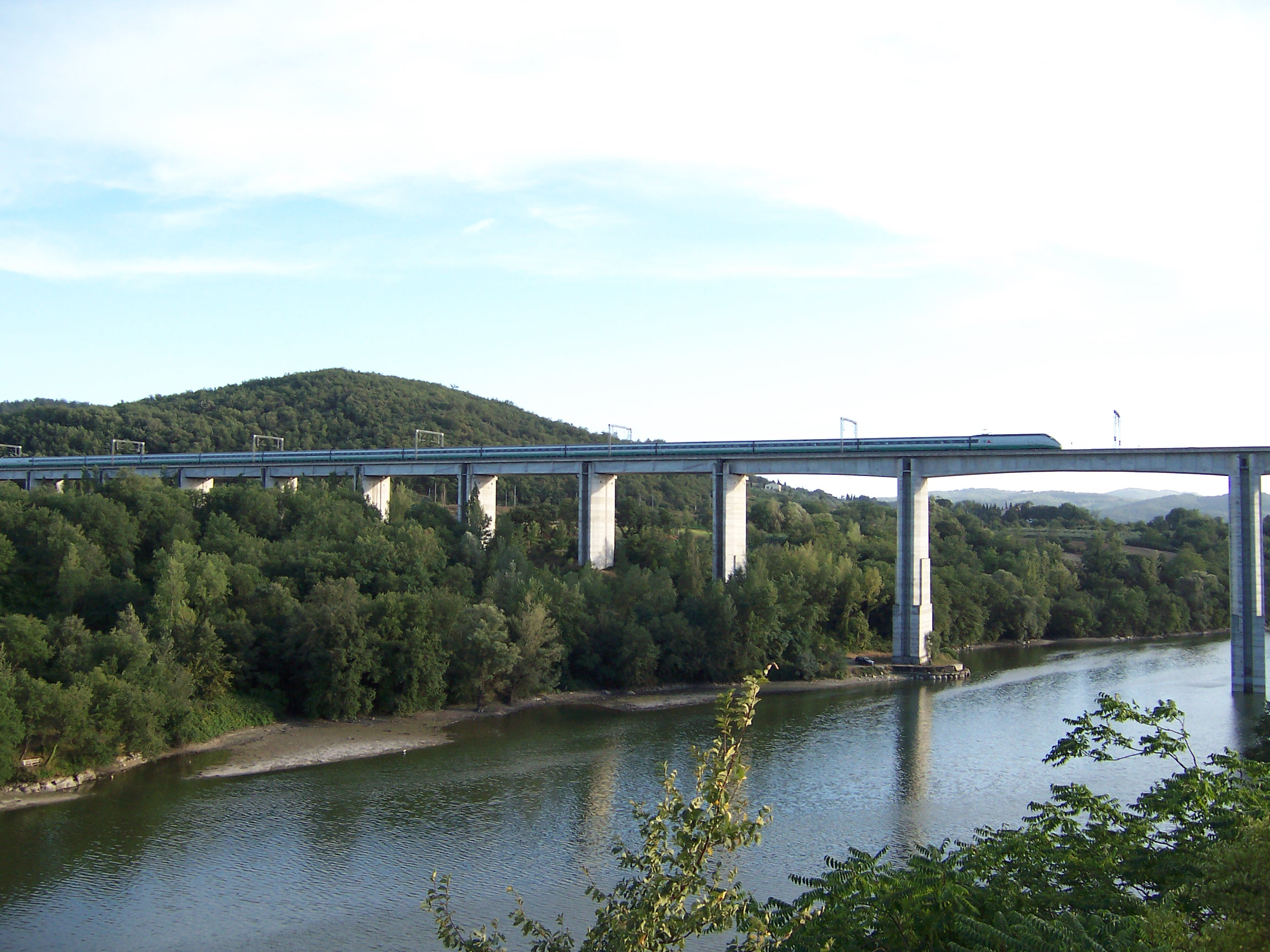
- ETR 500 on a viaduct near Arezzo

Overview
- Status: Operational
- Owner: RFI
- Locale: Italy
- Termini: Firenze Santa Maria Novella railway station; Roma Termini railway station

Service
- Type: Heavy rail
- System: Italian high-speed rail system
- Operator(s): Rete Ferroviaria Italiana (RFI) (2001–present); FS (1977–2001)

History
- Opened: 24 February 1977 completed on 26 May 1992

Technical
- Line length: 254 km (158 mi)
- Track gauge: 1,435 mm (4 ft 8 1/2 in) standard gauge
- Electrification: 3 kV DC
- Operating speed: 250 km/h (155 mph)
Route map
- Source: Italian railway atlas

The Florence–Rome high-speed railway line is a link in the Italian high-speed rail network. It is known as the ferrovia direttissima Firenze–Roma in Italian—meaning "most direct Florence–Rome railway" (abbreviated DD); this name reflects the naming of the Rome–Formia–Naples Direttissima opened in 1927 and the Bologna–Florence Direttissima opened in 1934. The line was the first high-speed line opened in Europe when more than half of it opened on 24 February 1977. It was completed on 26 May 1992, reducing the time of the fastest trains between the two cities to 1 hour and 20 minutes. The old line is referred to by Ferrovie dello Stato (the State Railways) as the Linea Lenta (meaning "slow line", abbreviated LL) to distinguish it from the parallel high-speed line.

In 2016 a contract was let for resignalling with ETCS level 2. The line is part of Corridor 1 of the European Union's Trans-European high-speed rail network, which connects Berlin and Palermo.

== History ==
The 254-kilometre (158 mi) railway between Rome and Florence developed from several different lines by several different companies for different purposes and as a result was curvy and slow. Over the years there had been many studies, proposals and projects for deviations to straighten the line but nothing came of them. After World War II, it was finally decided to build a new line that was straighter, faster and especially shorter (237.5 kilometres (147.6 mi)) than the old Florence–Rome line; it was also to be well-integrated with the existing line, rather than replace it. The project was approved and funded in late 1968 and early 1969. This was the first high-speed rail project—in the sense that "high-speed" is now used—to be commenced in Europe.

On 25 June 1970, work began on the most important element of the project: the 5,375-metre-long (17,635 ft) Paglia viaduct over the Paglia river, which is made up of 205 25-metre-long (82 ft) linear spans of and five 50-metre-long (160 ft) arched spans and is the longest viaduct in Europe. It was expected that the first 138-kilometre (86 mi) section of the line from Roma Termini to Città della Pieve would take five years to complete, but it was not in fact opened until 24 February 1977. It was a milestone in the history of Italian railways, but progress was subsequently slowed by numerous obstacles, some of a political nature. The line had to be rerouted near Arezzo due to problems in driving a tunnel. The official opening took place with a train consisting of an FS Class E444 locomotive and Gran Comfort coaches.

The 51-kilometre (32 mi) section of line between Città della Pieve and Arezzo was completed on 29 September 1985; the 20-kilometre (12 mi) section between Valdarno and Florence was opened on 30 May 1986 and finally on 26 May 1992 the 44-kilometre (27 mi) section between Arezzo and Valdarno was opened.

== Route ==
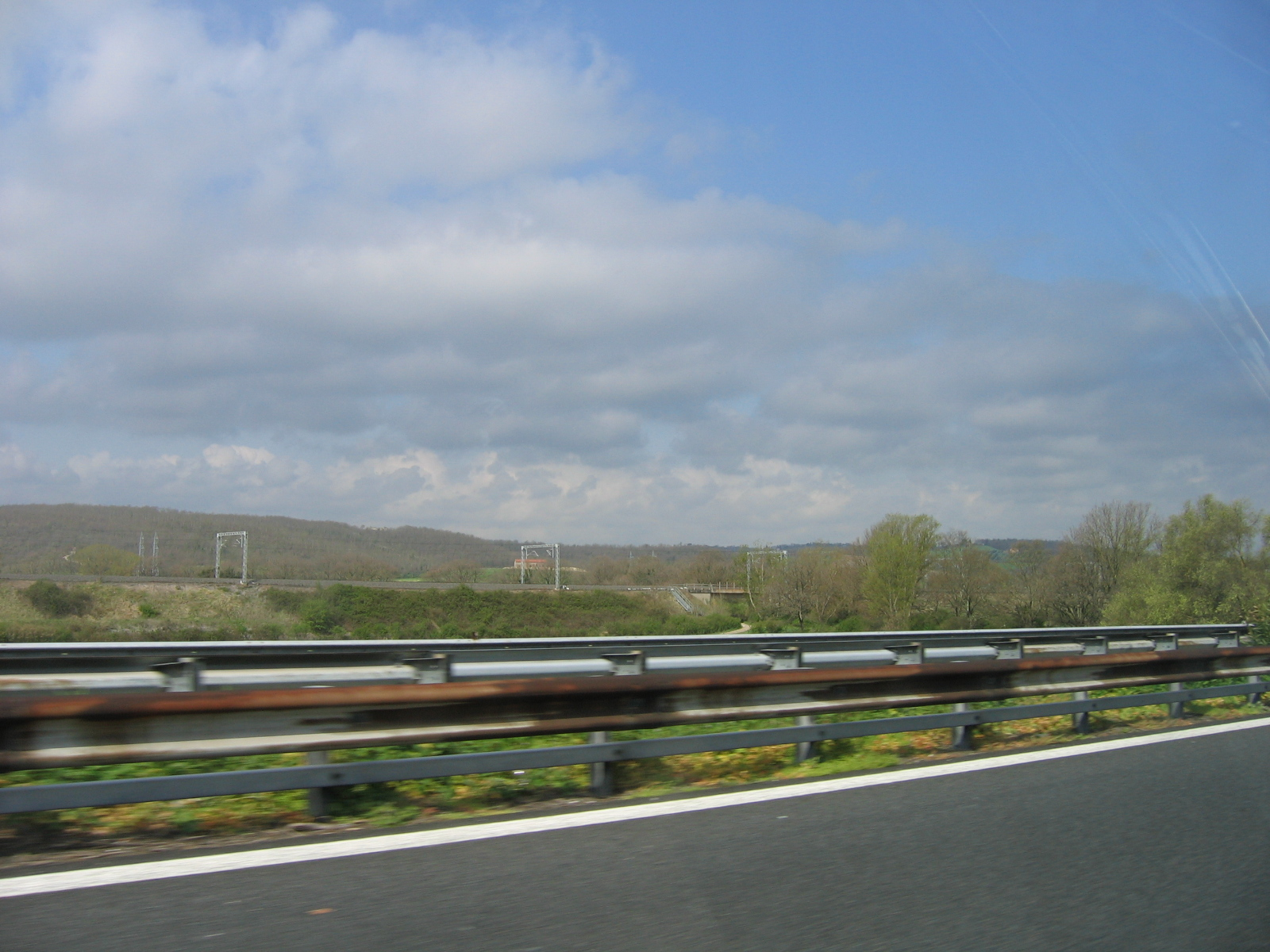
Direttissima from the A1 near Orte

The line has a largely straight path with a maximum grade of 0.8%, no level crossings or intersections of any kind with road or rail traffic, and the centre of tracks 4 metres (13 ft) apart to counteract the dynamic effects created by trains passing each other. Communication with drivers consists of an adaptation of the Italian RS4 Codici train protection system with in-cabin repetition of signals using nine codes and earth to train telephone communication. The minimum radius of curves is 3,000 metres (9,800 ft), enabling an operating speed of 250 km/h (155 mph). Connections between the two tracks in both directions every 16.2 kilometres (10.1 mi) allow trains to use either track in either direction or for all operations to operate on a single track if necessary.

The rails are laid using a UIC 60 kilograms per metre (40 lb/ft) rail profile, with electrically welded rails attached to 2.30-metre-long (7 ft 7 in) prestressed reinforced concrete sleepers, spaced 60 centimetres (24 in) apart with Pandrol clips. The interconnections between the high-speed lines and the old Florence–Bologna lines are implemented through grade-separated crossings above or below the line rather than crossing over the opposing track on the level. The switches between the two running lines are capable of supporting speeds of up to 100 km/h (62 mph), while the 15 switches to connecting lines support speeds of up to 160 km/h (99 mph). The line is electrified at 3 kV DC, and supplied by substations at 16 kilometres (9.9 mi) intervals.

=== Signalling upgrade ===
Ansaldo STS upgraded the signalling and train protection system with ETCS level 2, and it was first activated on the section between PM Rovezzano – Arezzo South interconnection in December 2020. This was the first phase of the adjustment plan to AV/AC (High Speed/High Capacity) standards proposed by RFI.

=== Future ===
It is proposed to raise the maximum speed from 250 km/h (155 mph) to 270 or 280 km/h (170 or 175 mph). It has additionally been proposed to re-electrify the line at 25 kV AC in the past but this has been abandoned.

== See also ==
- List of railway lines in Italy
- Bologna–Florence high-speed railway
