= List of railway stations in Tuscany =

This is the list of the railway stations in Tuscany owned by:

- Rete Ferroviaria Italiana (RFI), a branch of the Italian state company Ferrovie dello Stato;
- Rete Ferroviaria Toscana (RFT), a branch of La Ferroviaria Italiana.

Station	Railway	Locality	Province	Category
Albergo	RFT	Civitella in Val di Chiana	Arezzo	
Albinia	RFI	Albinia	Grosseto	Silver
Altopascio	RFI	Altopascio	Lucca	Silver
Antignano	RFI	Livorno	Livorno	Bronze
Arbia	RFI	Arbia	Siena	Bronze
Arezzo Pescaiola	RFT	Arezzo	Arezzo	
Arezzo	RFI	Arezzo	Arezzo	Gold
Asciano	RFI	Asciano	Siena	Bronze
Asciano–Monte Oliveto Maggiore	RFI	Asciano	Siena	Silver
Aulla Lunigiana	RFI	Aulla	Massa-Carrara	Silver
Baciano	RFT	Capolona	Arezzo	
Badesse	RFI	Badesse	Siena	Bronze
Bagni di Lucca	RFI	Bagni di Lucca	Lucca	Bronze
Barberino Val d'Elsa	RFI	Barberino Val d'Elsa	Florence (Firenze)	Bronze
Barga–Gallicano	RFI	Barga	Lucca	Bronze
Biagioni–Lagacci	RFI	Biagioni di Granaglione	Pistoia	Bronze
Bibbiena Corsalone	RFT	Bibbiena	Arezzo	
Bibbiena	RFT	Bibbiena	Arezzo	
Biforco	RFI	Biforco	Florence (Firenze)	Bronze
Bolgheri	RFI	Bolgheri	Livorno	Bronze
Borgo a Buggiano	RFI	Borgo a Buggiano	Pistoia	Bronze
Borgo a Mozzano	RFI	Borgo a Mozzano	Lucca	Bronze
Borgo San Lorenzo	RFI	Borgo San Lorenzo	Florence (Firenze)	Silver
Borgo San Lorenzo–Rimorelli	RFI	Borgo San Lorenzo	Florence (Firenze)	Bronze
Bucine	RFI	Bucine	Arezzo	Bronze
Buonconvento	RFI	Buonconvento	Siena	Bronze
Calbenzano	RFT	Subbiano	Arezzo	
Calenzano	RFI	Calenzano	Florence (Firenze)	Silver
Camaiore Lido–Capezzano	RFI	Camaiore	Lucca	Bronze
Campiglia Marittima	RFI	Venturina Terme	Livorno	Silver
Campomigliaio	RFI	Campomigliaio	Florence (Firenze)	Bronze
Camporgiano	RFI	Camporgiano	Lucca	Bronze
Camucia–Cortona	RFI	Cortona	Arezzo	Silver
Capalbio	RFI	Capalbio Scalo	Grosseto	Silver
Capolona	RFT	Capolona	Arezzo	
Carrara–Avenza	RFI	Carrara	Massa-Carrara	Silver
Cascina	RFI	Cascina	Pisa	Silver
Casello 1	RFT	Arezzo	Arezzo	
Casino di Terra	RFI	Casino di Terra	Pisa	Bronze
Castagneto Carducci–Donoratico	RFI	Donoratico	Livorno	Silver
Castagno	RFI	Castagno	Pistoia	Bronze
Castelfiorentino	RFI	Castelfiorentino	Florence (Firenze)	Silver
Castellina in Chianti–Monteriggioni	RFI	Castellina Scalo	Siena	Silver
Castelnuovo Berardenga	RFI	Castelnuovo Scalo	Siena	Bronze
Castelnuovo di Garfagnana	RFI	Castelnuovo di Garfagnana	Lucca	Silver
Castelvecchio Pascoli	RFI	Castelvecchio Pascoli	Lucca	Bronze
Castiglion Fiorentino	RFI	Castiglion Fiorentino	Arezzo	Silver
Castiglioncello	RFI	Castiglioncello	Livorno	Silver
Cecina	RFI	Cecina	Livorno	Silver
Certaldo	RFI	Certaldo	Florence (Firenze)	Silver
Chiusi–Chianciano Terme	RFI	Chiusi Scalo	Siena	Silver
Civitella Paganico	RFI	Paganico	Grosseto	Bronze
Civitella–Badia al Pino	RFT	Civitella in Val di Chiana	Arezzo	
Compiobbi	RFI	Compiobbi	Florence (Firenze)	Bronze
Contea–Londa	RFI	Londa	Florence (Firenze)	Silver
Corbezzi	RFI	Corbezzi	Pistoia	Bronze
Crespino del Lamone	RFI	Crespino del Lamone	Florence (Firenze)	Bronze
Dicomano	RFI	Dicomano	Florence (Firenze)	Silver
Diecimo–Pescaglia	RFI	Pescaglia	Lucca	Bronze
Empoli	RFI	Empoli	Florence (Firenze)	Gold
Equi Terme	RFI	Equi Terme	Massa-Carrara	Bronze
Fiesole–Caldine	RFI	Fiesole	Florence (Firenze)	Bronze
Figline Valdarno	RFI	Figline Valdarno	Florence (Firenze)	Silver
Filattiera	RFI	Filattiera	Massa-Carrara	Bronze
Firenze Campo di Marte	RFI	Firenze	Florence (Firenze)	Gold
Firenze Castello	RFI	Firenze	Florence (Firenze)	Silver
Firenze Le Cure	RFI	Firenze	Florence (Firenze)	Bronze
Firenze Le Piagge	RFI	Firenze	Florence (Firenze)	Silver
Firenze Porta al Prato	RFI	Firenze	Florence (Firenze)	Silver
Firenze Rifredi	RFI	Firenze	Florence (Firenze)	Gold
Firenze Rovezzano	RFI	Firenze	Florence (Firenze)	Silver
Firenze San Marco Vecchio	RFI	Firenze	Florence (Firenze)	Silver
Firenze Santa Maria Novella	RFI	Firenze	Florence (Firenze)	Platinum
Firenze Statuto	RFI	Firenze	Florence (Firenze)	Silver
Fivizzano–Gassano	RFI	Fivizzano	Massa-Carrara	Bronze
Fivizzano–Rometta–Soliera	RFI	Fivizzano	Massa-Carrara	Bronze
Foiano della Chiana	RFT	Foiano della Chiana	Arezzo	
Follonica	RFI	Follonica	Grosseto	Silver
Fornaci di Barga	RFI	Fornaci di Barga	Lucca	Bronze
Forte dei Marmi–Seravezza–Querceta	RFI	Forte dei Marmi	Lucca	Silver
Fosciandora–Ceserana	RFI	Fosciandora	Lucca	Bronze
Gavorrano	RFI	Potassa	Grosseto	Bronze
Ghivizzano–Coreglia	RFI	Ghivizzano	Lucca	Bronze
Giovi	RFT	Arezzo	Arezzo	
Gragnola	RFI	Fosciandora	Massa-Carrara	Bronze
Granaiolo	RFI	Castelfiorentino	Florence (Firenze)	Bronze
Grosseto	RFI	Grosseto	Grosseto	Gold
Il Neto	RFI	Sesto Fiorentino	Florence (Firenze)	Bronze
Incisa	RFI	Incisa in Val d'Arno	Florence (Firenze)	Silver
Lastra a Signa	RFI	Lastra a Signa	Florence (Firenze)	Silver
Laterina	RFI	Laterina	Arezzo	Bronze
Livorno Centrale	RFI	Livorno	Livorno	Gold
Lucca	RFI	Lucca	Lucca	Gold
Lucignano–Marciano–Pozzo	RFT	Lucignano	Arezzo	
Marradi–Palazzuolo sul Senio	RFI	Marradi	Florence (Firenze)	Silver
Massa Centro	RFI	Massa	Massa-Carrara	Silver
Massarosa–Bozzano	RFI	Massarosa	Lucca	Bronze
Memmenano	RFT	Poppi	Arezzo	
Minucciano–Pieve–Casola	RFI	Minucciano	Massa-Carrara	Bronze
Molino del Pallone	RFI	Molino del Pallone	Pistoia	Bronze
Montale–Agliana	RFI	Montale	Pistoia	Silver
Monte Antico	RFI	Monte Antico	Grosseto	Bronze
Monte San Savino	RFT	Monte San Savino	Arezzo	
Montecarlo–San Salvatore	RFI	Montecarlo	Pistoia	Bronze
Montecatini Centro	RFI	Montecatini Terme	Pistoia	Silver
Montecatini Terme–Monsummano	RFI	Montecatini Terme	Pistoia	Silver
Montelupo–Capraia	RFI	Montelupo Fiorentino	Florence (Firenze)	Silver
Montepescali	RFI	Braccagni	Grosseto	Bronze
Montepulciano	RFI	Montepulciano Stazione	Siena	Silver
Monteroni d'Arbia	RFI	Monteroni d'Arbia	Siena	Bronze
Montevarchi–Terranuova	RFI	Montevarchi	Arezzo	Silver
Monzone–Monte dei Bianchi–Isolano	RFI	Monzone	Massa-Carrara	Bronze
Murlo	RFI	La Befa	Siena	Bronze
Navacchio	RFI	Navacchio	Pisa	Bronze
Nozzano	RFI	Nozzano	Lucca	Bronze
Orbetello–Monte Argentario	RFI	Orbetello	Grosseto	Silver
Pescia	RFI	Pescia	Pistoia	Silver
Pian del Mugnone	RFI	Fiesole	Florence (Firenze)	Bronze
Piazza al Serchio	RFI	Piazza al Serchio	Lucca	Silver
Pietrasanta	RFI	Pietrasanta	Lucca	Silver
Piombino Marittima	RFI	Piombino	Livorno	Silver
Piombino	RFI	Piombino	Livorno	Silver
Pisa Aeroporto	RFI	Pisa	Pisa	Silver
Pisa Centrale	RFI	Pisa	Pisa	Platinum
Pisa San Rossore	RFI	Pisa	Pisa	Silver
Pistoia Ovest	RFI	Pistoia	Pistoia	Bronze
Pistoia	RFI	Pistoia	Pistoia	Gold
Poggibonsi–San Gimignano	RFI	Poggibonsi	Siena	Silver
Poggio–Careggine–Vagli	RFI	Careggine	Lucca	Bronze
Pontassieve	RFI	Pontassieve	Florence (Firenze)	Silver
Ponte a Elsa	RFI	Ponte a Elsa	Florence (Firenze)	Bronze
Ponte a Moriano	RFI	Lucca	Lucca	Bronze
Ponte a Tressa	RFI	Ponte a Tressa	Siena	Bronze
Ponte della Venturina	RFI	Ponte della Venturina	Pistoia	Bronze
Ponte Ginori	RFI	Montecatini Val di Cecina	Pisa	Bronze
Pontedera–Casciana Terme	RFI	Pontedera	Pisa	Silver
Ponticino	RFI	Ponticino	Arezzo	Bronze
Pontremoli	RFI	Pontremoli	Massa-Carrara	Silver
Popolano di Marradi	RFI	Popolano	Florence (Firenze)	Bronze
Poppi	RFT	Poppi	Arezzo	
Populonia	RFI	Populonia Stazione	Livorno	Bronze
Porcari	RFI	Porcari	Lucca	Bronze
Porrena–Strada–Montemignanio	RFT	Poppi	Arezzo	
Pracchia	RFI	Pracchia	Pistoia	Bronze
Pratignone	RFI	Calenzano	Florence (Firenze)	Bronze
Prato Borgo Nuovo	RFI	Prato	Prato	Silver
Prato Centrale	RFI	Prato	Prato	Gold
Prato Porta al Serraglio	RFI	Prato	Prato	Silver
Pratovecchio	RFT	Pratovecchio Stia	Arezzo	
Pratovecchio Stia	RFT	Pratovecchio Stia	Arezzo	
Puglia–Ceciliano	RFT	Arezzo	Arezzo	
Quercianella–Sonnino	RFI	Quercianella	Livorno	Silver
Rapolano Terme	RFI	Rapolano Terme	Siena	Bronze
Rassina	RFT	Castel Focognano	Arezzo	
Rignano sull'Arno–Reggello	RFI	Rignano sull'Arno	Florence (Firenze)	Silver
Rigoli	RFI	Rigoli	Pisa	Bronze
Rigomagno	RFI	Rigomagno	Siena	Bronze
Ripafratta	RFI	Ripafratta	Pisa	Bronze
Riparbella	RFI	Riparbella	Pisa	Bronze
Roccastrada	RFI	Roccastrada	Grosseto	Bronze
Ronta	RFI	Ronta	Florence (Firenze)	Bronze
Rosignano	RFI	Rosignano Marittimo	Livorno	Silver
Rufina	RFI	Rufina	Florence (Firenze)	Silver
San Donnino–Badia	RFI	Campi Bisenzio	Florence (Firenze)	Silver
San Frediano a Settimo	RFI	San Frediano a Settimo	Pisa	Bronze
San Giovanni Valdarno	RFI	San Giovanni Valdarno	Arezzo	Silver
San Giuliano Terme	RFI	San Giuliano Terme	Pisa	Silver
San Miniato–Fucecchio	RFI	San Miniato	Pisa	Silver
San Mommè	RFI	San Mommè	Pistoia	Bronze
San Piero a Sieve	RFI	San Piero a Sieve	Florence (Firenze)	Silver
San Pietro a Vico	RFI	Lucca	Lucca	Bronze
San Romano–Montopoli–Santa Croce	RFI	Montopoli in Val d'Arno	Pisa	Silver
San Vincenzo	RFI	San Vincenzo	Livorno	Silver
Santa Mama	RFT	Subbiano	Arezzo	
Sant'Ellero	RFI	Sant'Ellero	Florence (Firenze)	Silver
Scarlino	RFI	Scarlino Scalo	Grosseto	Bronze
Scopeti	RFI	Scopeti	Florence (Firenze)	Bronze
Scorcetoli	RFI	Scorcetoli	Massa-Carrara	Bronze
Serravalle Pistoiese	RFI	Serravalle Pistoiese	Pistoia	Bronze
Sesto Fiorentino	RFI	Sesto Fiorentino	Florence (Firenze)	Silver
Sieci	RFI	Le Sieci	Florence (Firenze)	Silver
Siena	RFI	Siena	Siena	Gold
Siena Zona Industriale	RFI	Isola d'Arbia	Siena	Bronze
Signa	RFI	Signa	Florence (Firenze)	Silver
Sinalunga	RFI	Sinalunga	Siena	Silver
Sticciano	RFI	Sticciano	Grosseto	Bronze
Subbiano	RFT	Capolona	Arezzo	
Talamone	RFI	Fonteblanda	Grosseto	Silver
Tassignano–Capannori	RFI	Capannori	Lucca	Bronze
Terontola–Cortona	RFI	Cortona	Arezzo	Silver
Torre del Lago Puccini	RFI	Torre del Lago	Lucca	Silver
Torrita di Siena	RFI	Torrita di Siena	Siena	Bronze
Vada	RFI	Vada	Livorno	Silver
Vaglia	RFI	Vaglia	Florence (Firenze)	Bronze
Vaiano	RFI	Vaiano	Prato	Silver
Vernio–Montepiano–Cantagallo	RFI	Vernio	Prato	Silver
Via Chiari	RFT	Arezzo	Arezzo	
Viareggio	RFI	Viareggio	Lucca	Gold
Vicchio	RFI	Vicchio	Florence (Firenze)	Silver
Vignale–Riotorto	RFI	Riotorto	Livorno	Bronze
Villafranca–Bagnone	RFI	Villafranca in Lunigiana	Massa-Carrara	Silver
Villetta San Romano	RFI	San Romano in Garfagnana	Lucca	Bronze
Volterra–Saline–Pomarance	RFI	Saline di Volterra	Pisa	Bronze
Zambra	RFI	Sesto Fiorentino	Florence (Firenze)	Silver

== Former stations ==
Station	Locality	Province
Alberese	Alberese	Grosseto
Ansedonia	Ansedonia	Grosseto
Ardenza	Livorno	Livorno
Bibbona Casale	La California	Livorno
Chiarone	Chiarone Scalo	Grosseto
Cuna	Cuna	Siena
Cura Nuova	Cura Nuova	Grosseto
Follonica Porto	Follonica	Grosseto
Giuncarico	Giuncarico	Grosseto
Isola d'Arbia	Isola d'Arbia	Siena
Le Piane	Monte Argentario	Grosseto
Livorno Calambrone	Livorno	Livorno
Lucignano d'Arbia	Lucignano d'Arbia	Siena
Massa Marittima	Ghirlanda	Grosseto
Monte Amiata	Monte Amiata Scalo	Siena
Monteroni Sud	Monteroni d'Arbia	Siena
Monte Sante Marie	Monte Sante Marie	Siena
Orbetello Città	Orbetello	Grosseto
Ponte d'Arbia	Ponte d'Arbia	Siena
Porto Santo Stefano	Porto Santo Stefano	Grosseto
Rispescia	Rispescia	Grosseto
Salceta	Murlo	Siena
San Giovanni d'Asso	San Giovanni d'Asso	Siena
Sant'Angelo–Cinigiano	Sant'Angelo Scalo	Siena
Santa Liberata	Monte Argentario	Grosseto
Schiantapetto	Massa Marittima	Grosseto
Staggia Senese	Staggia Senese	Siena
Terra Rossa	Porto Ercole	Grosseto
Torre Bibbiano	Bibbiano	Siena
Torrenieri–Montalcino	Torrenieri	Siena
Trequanda	Trequanda	Siena
Valpiana	Valpiana	Grosseto

== See also ==
- Railway stations in Italy
- Ferrovie dello Stato
- Rail transport in Italy
- High-speed rail in Italy
- Transport in Italy
