= Montepescali railway station =

Railway station in Italy

Montepescali
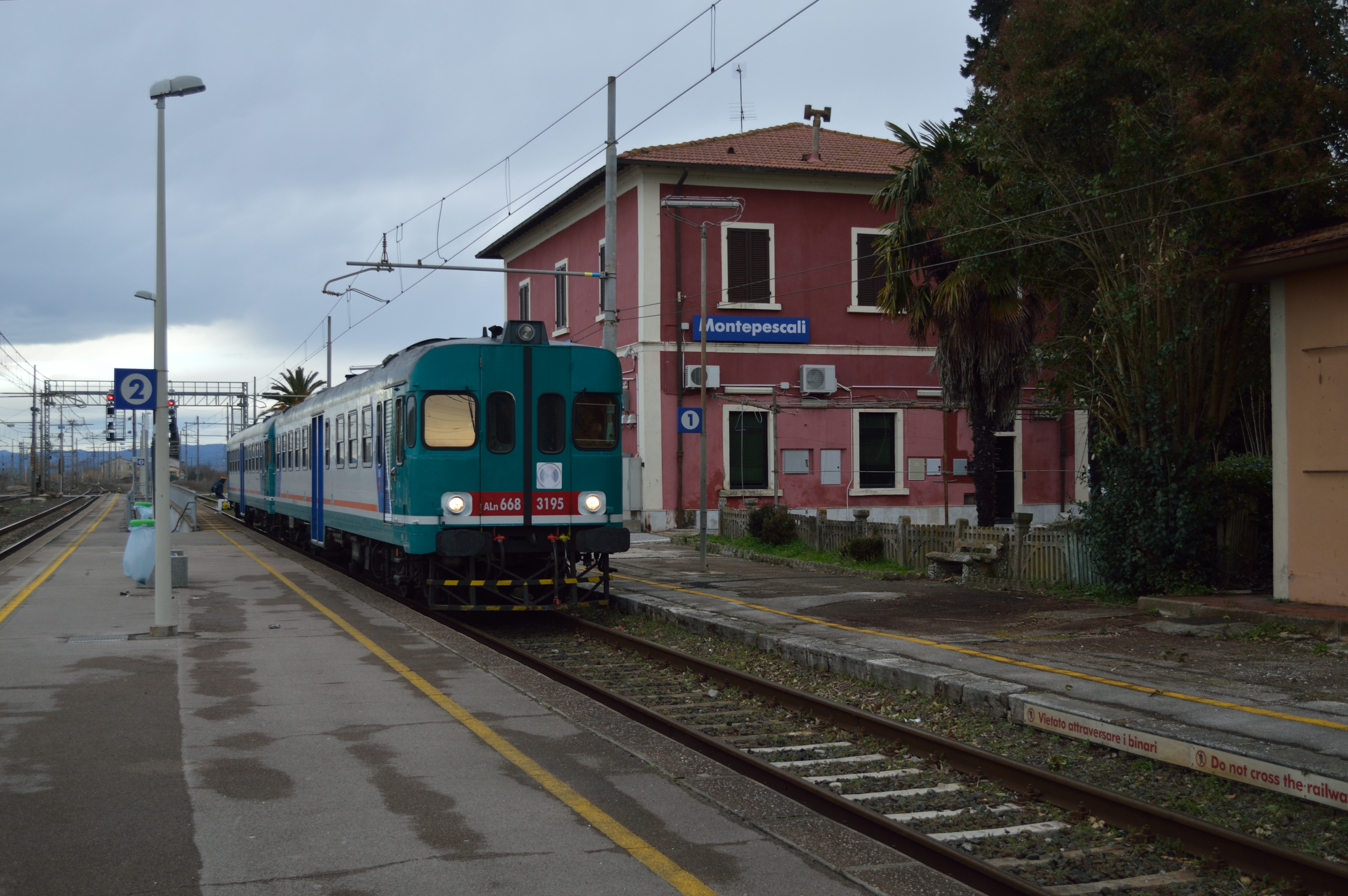
- View of the station building with a passing Siena-Grosseto train.

General information
- Location: Via Lapini; Braccagni 58100; Grosseto, Grosseto, Tuscany; Italy
- Coordinates: 42°52′11″N 11°04′08″E
- Operator: Rete Ferroviaria Italiana; Trenitalia
- Lines: Tirrenica; Siena–Grosseto
- Distance: 199.410 km (123.908 mi) from Roma Termini
- Tracks: 3 (previously 4)

Other information
- Classification: Bronze

History
- Opened: 15 June 1864; 162 years ago
Location
- Location within Tuscany Location within Italy

Montepescali railway station is an Italian railway station on the Tirrenica railway line, located in the village of Braccagni, at the bottom of the hill of Montepescali, near the city of Grosseto. It serves as a junction for services on the Siena–Grosseto line that connect here and follow the main line south into Grosseto.

== History ==
The station opened on 15 June 1864 along with the section of the Pisa–Rome railway from Follonica to Orbetello. In 1872, the original Siena–Grosseto railway was constructed, with trains running to Monte Antico, before following the Asciano–Monte Antico line to Asciano, and the Central Tuscan line into Siena. In 1927, a new line was opened that connected Monte Antico and Siena via Buonconvento. In 1994, services on the Asciano-Monte Antico railway ceased, leaving the sole connection along the Siena-Grosseto railway from Montepescali as the line direct to Siena. The Tirrenica railway has continuously seen traffic since 1874 without interruption.

== Train services and movements ==
Regular passenger services to the station consist of regionale and regionale veloce services, which run frequently to Grosseto, Pisa Centrale, Roma Termini, Campiglia Marittima and Florence SMN. Passenger services on the Siena–Grosseto railway are all regionale classification and run primarily to Grosseto and Siena, and in early mornings and evenings to Empoli and Florence.

== Gallery ==
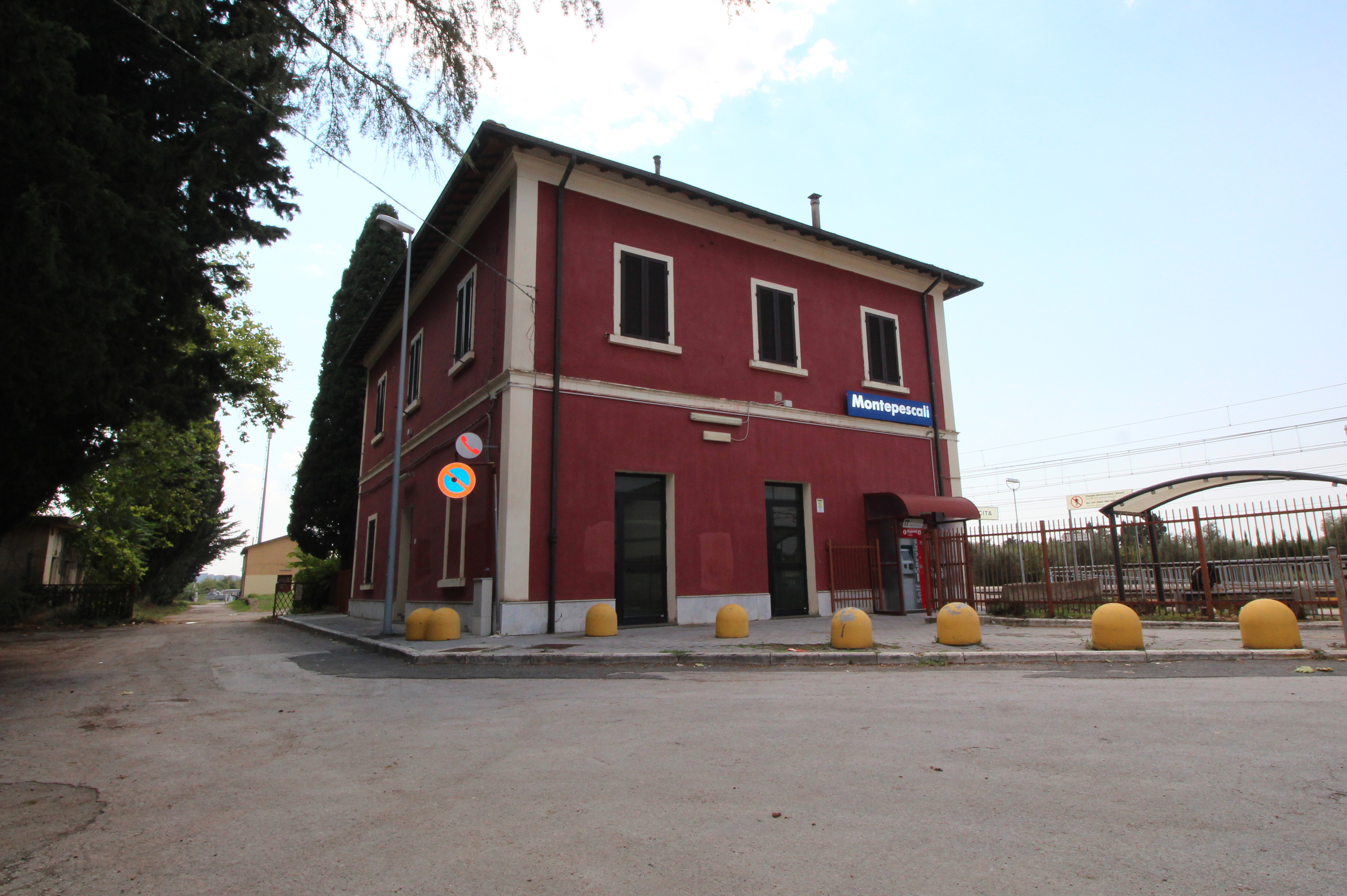
The station seen from the parking lot.

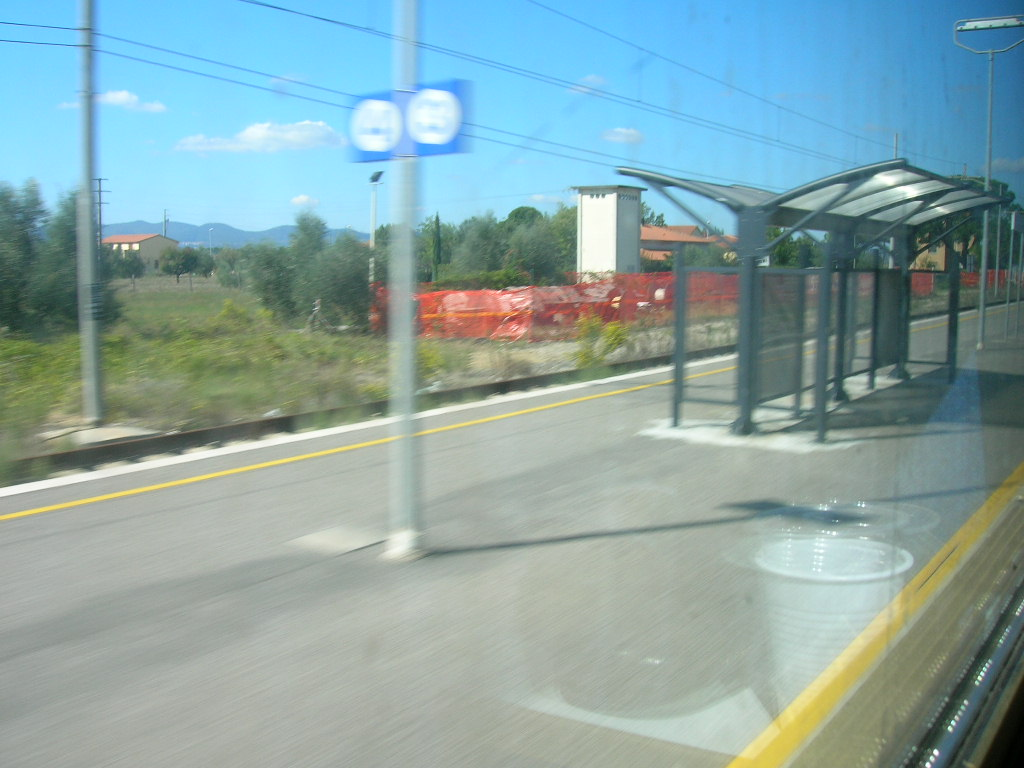
Platform 3 seen from a passing train, when the fourth platform was still in situ.

== See also ==
- History of rail transport in Italy
- List of railway stations in Tuscany
- Rail transport in Italy
- Railway stations in Italy
