= Vignale–Riotorto railway station =

Railway station in Italy

Vignale–Riotorto

General information
- Location: Località Vignale Stazione; Riotorto 57025; Piombino, Livorno, Tuscany; Italy
- Coordinates: 42°56′52″N 10°56′01″E
- Operator: Rete Ferroviaria Italiana; Trenitalia
- Line: Tirrenica
- Tracks: 2

Other information
- Classification: Bronze

History
- Opened: 15 December 1893; 132 years ago
Location
- Location within Tuscany Location within Italy

Vignale–Riotorto railway station is an Italian railway station on the Tirrenica railway line, located in the hamlet of Vignale, near Riotorto, in the municipality of Piombino, Province of Livorno, Tuscany.

== History ==
The station opened on 15 December 1893 as a new railway stop on the Pisa–Rome railway between the stations of Campiglia Marittima and Follonica.

== Train services and movements ==
Regular passenger services to the station consist of regionale and regionale veloce services, which run frequently to Grosseto, Campiglia Marittima, Pisa Centrale, and Orbetello.

== See also ==
- History of rail transport in Italy
- List of railway stations in Tuscany
- Rail transport in Italy
- Railway stations in Italy
