= Monteroni d'Arbia railway station =

Railway station in Italy

Monteroni d'Arbia
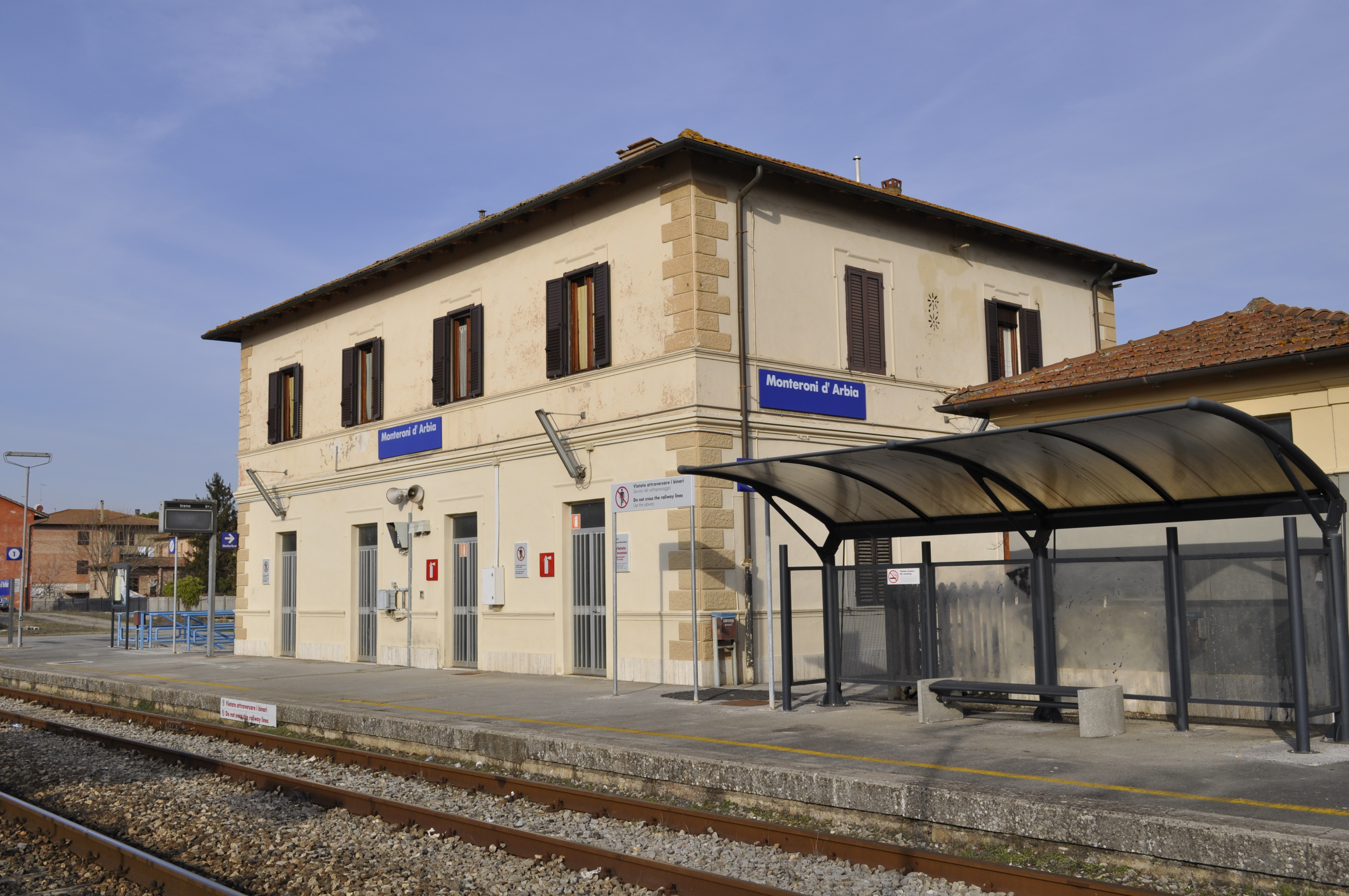
- View of the station building from platform 2

General information
- Location: Viale della Libertà; Monteroni d'Arbia SI 53014; Monteroni d'Arbia, Siena, Tuscany; Italy
- Coordinates: 43°13′48″N 11°25′11″E
- Elevation: 165 m (541 ft)
- Operator: Rete Ferroviaria Italiana; Trenitalia
- Line: Siena-Grosseto
- Distance: 39.621 km (24.619 mi) from Monte Antico
- Tracks: 2 (formerly 3)
- Connections: local bus services

Other information
- Classification: Bronze

History
- Opened: 30 May 1927; 99 years ago
Location
- Location within Tuscany Location within Italy

Monteroni d'Arbia railway station is an Italian railway station on the Siena-Grosseto railway line in Southern Tuscany.

== History ==
It was opened in 1927 as part of a line to connect Siena and Monte Antico to speed up travel between the cities of Siena and Grosseto. This line made a more direct connection than the Asciano-Monte Antico section that was opened along with the line from Monte Antico to the junction at Montepescali in 1872, and to this day services provide that connection, stopping at Monteroni d'Arbia. The station once had three platform faces, but recently the third platform's track has been removed. Most trains call at platform 2, but when trains pass, they use the loop onto platform 1.

== Train services and movements ==
Regular passenger services to the station are regionale services, which run daily to Grosseto and Siena and in early mornings and evenings to Buonconvento, Empoli and Florence. There is also a daily regionale veloce service to Florence from Buonconvento.

== Gallery ==
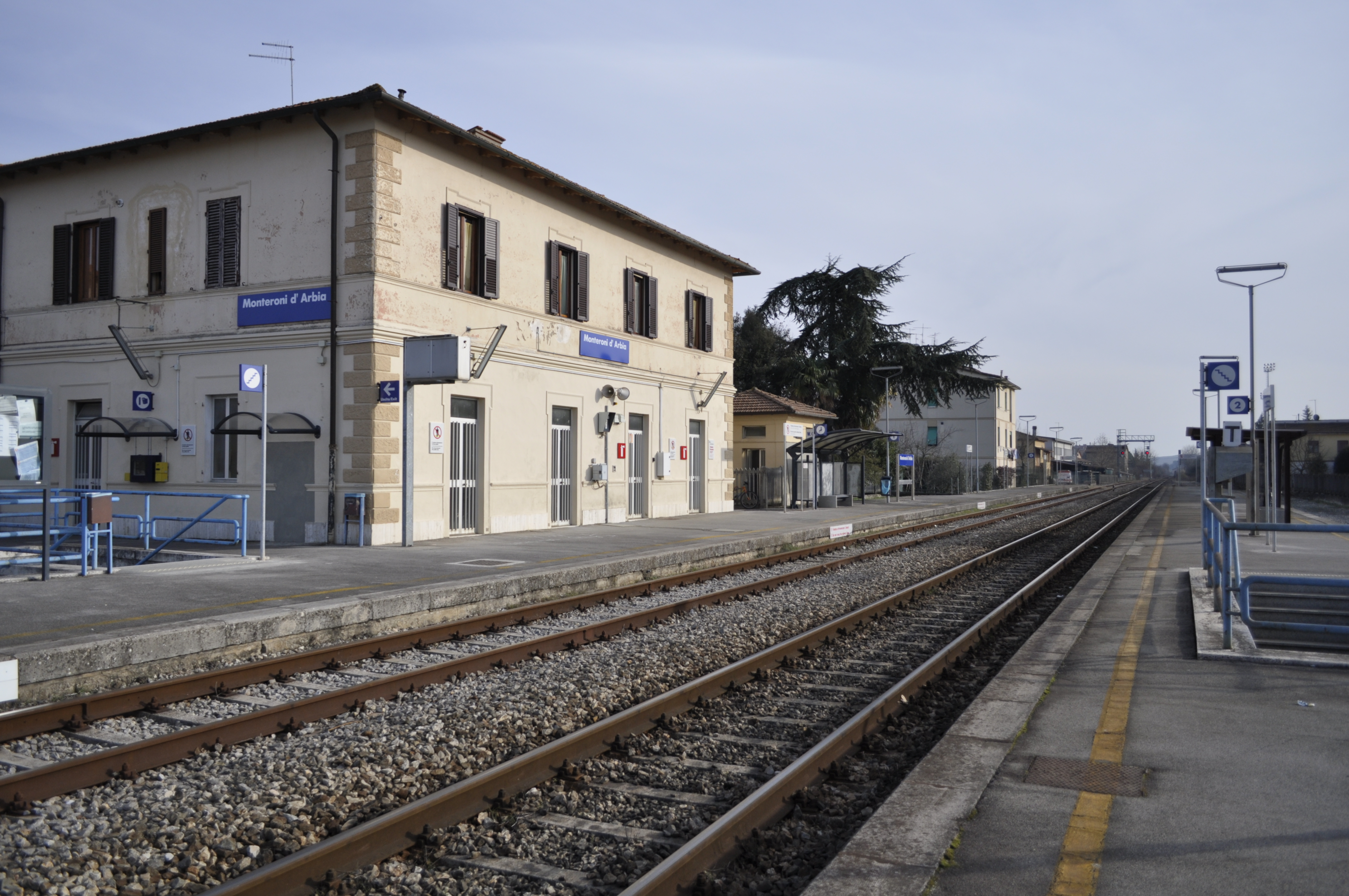
The station seen from the Siena end.

== See also ==
- History of rail transport in Italy
- List of railway stations in Tuscany
- Rail transport in Italy
- Railway stations in Italy
