= Buonconvento railway station =

Railway station in Italy

Buonconvento
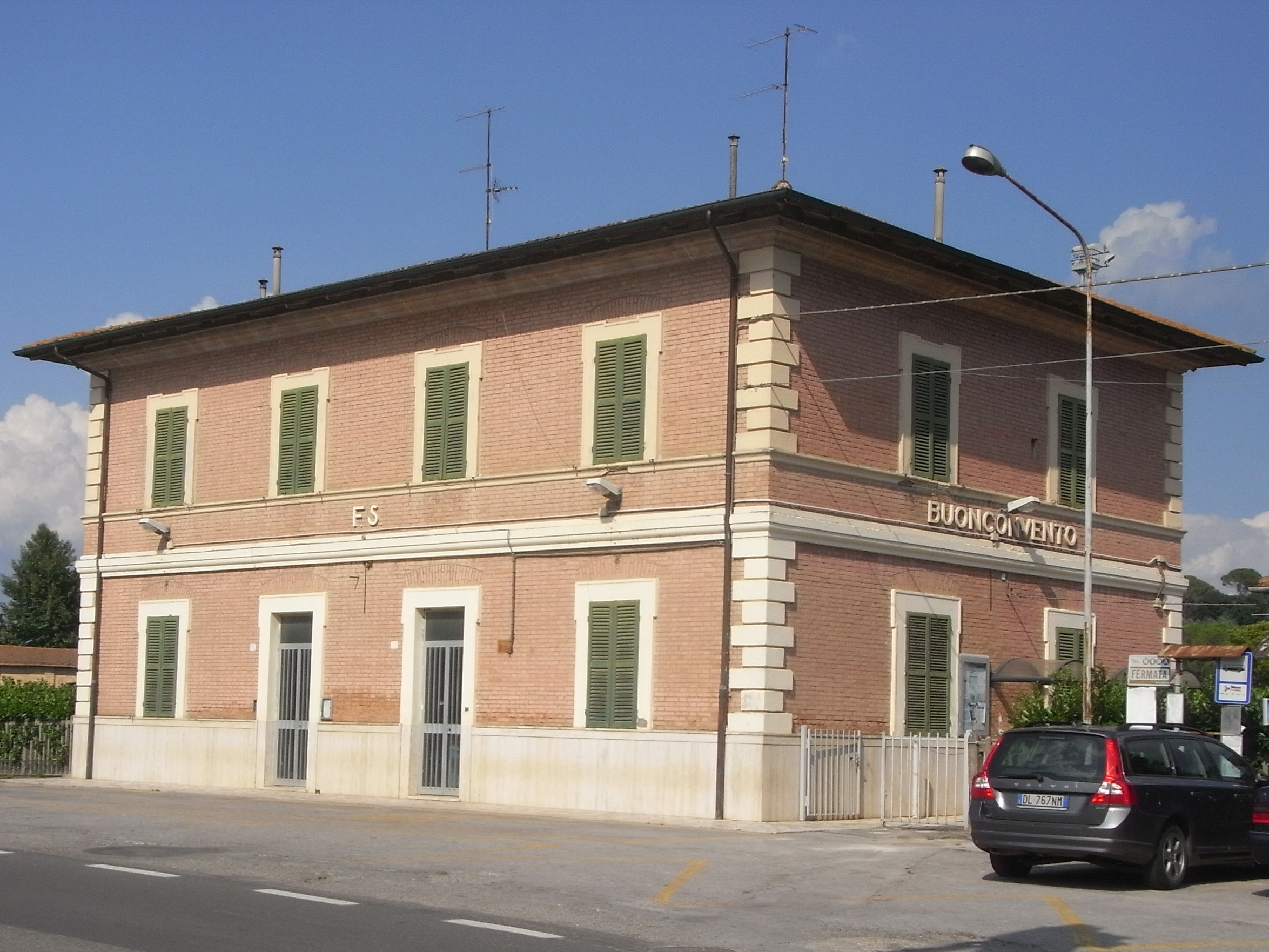
- View of the station building from Via Cassia

General information
- Location: 7 Via Cassia; Buonconvento SI 53022; Buonconvento, Siena, Tuscany; Italy
- Coordinates: 43.13552°N 11.48359°E
- Elevation: 146 m (479 ft)
- Operator: Rete Ferroviaria Italiana; Trenitalia
- Line: Siena–Grosseto
- Distance: 27.068 km (16.819 mi) from Monte Antico
- Tracks: 2 (and 2 freight sidings, used for maintenance)
- Connections: local bus services

Other information
- Classification: Bronze

History
- Opened: 30 May 1927; 99 years ago
Location
- Location within Tuscany Location within Italy

Buonconvento railway station is an Italian railway station on the Siena–Grosseto railway line in Southern Tuscany.

== History ==
Buonconvento railway station was opened on 30 May 1927 on a line that was built to provide a quicker connection between Siena and Grosseto than the original Asciano-Monte Antico section, connecting with the rest of the 1872-built line at Monte Antico. This station was one of the most important on the line, and until the late 1990s still accepted freight traffic from Siena and farther afield using its two sidings and warehouse. The station has two platform faces, as a large percentage of trains pass each other here. It is one of the busiest on the line, one reason being its proximity to the tourist hub of Montalcino and the Abbey of Monte Oliveto Maggiore, as well as being a public transport gateway to the Val d'Orcia, which is recognised as a UNESCO World Heritage Site. Also, Buonconvento is a member of I Borghi più belli d'Italia, and was promoted by Trenitalia in 2021 as a recommended place to visit, generating tourism through the station.

== Train services and movements ==
Regular passenger services to the station are regionale services, which run daily to Grosseto and Siena and in early mornings and evenings to Empoli and Florence. There is also a daily regionale veloce service from here to Florence. Trenonatura historic steam and diesel trains running through the Val d'Orcia along the Asciano-Monte Antico line pass through the station on their itinerary from Siena on selected dates of the year.

== Gallery ==
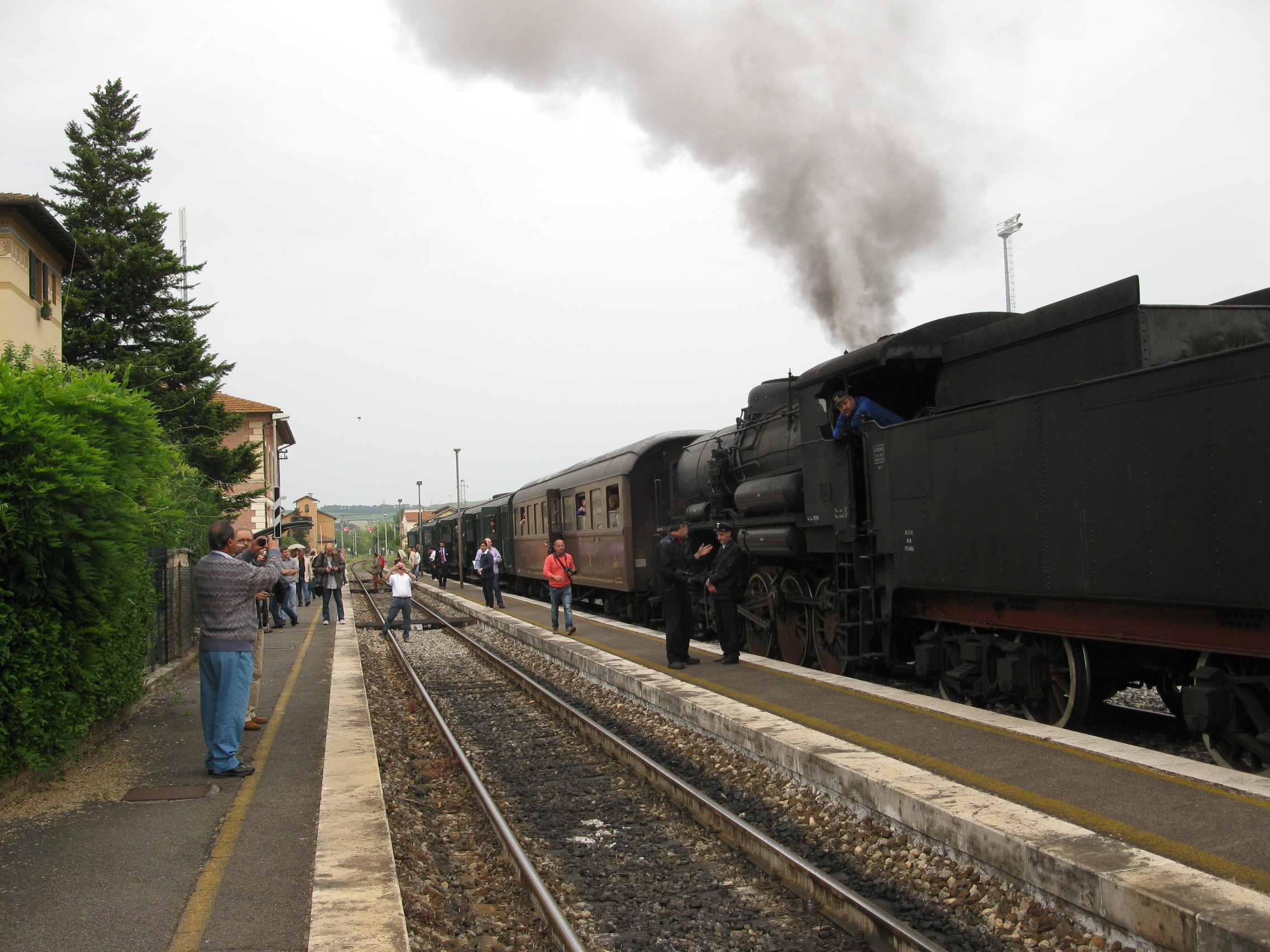
Trenonatura steam train at Buonconvento.

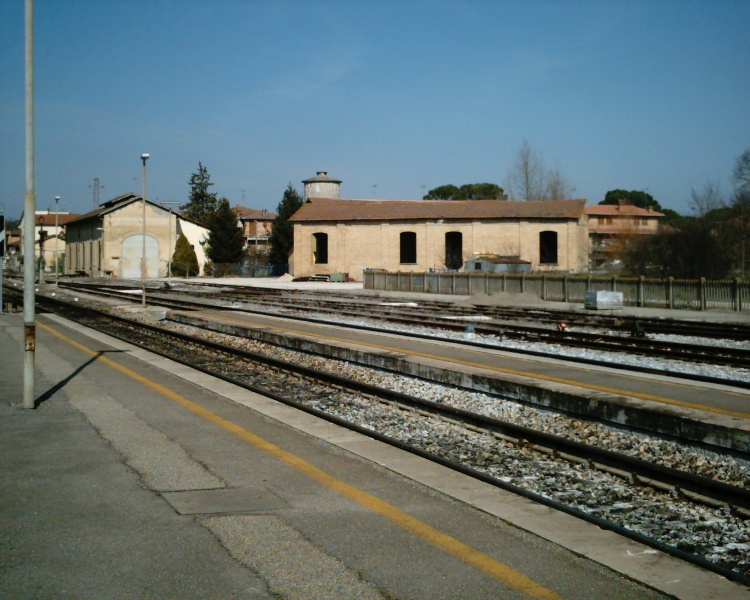
View from platform 2 over onto the former freight sidings.

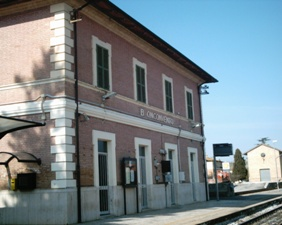
The station building, seen from platform 2.

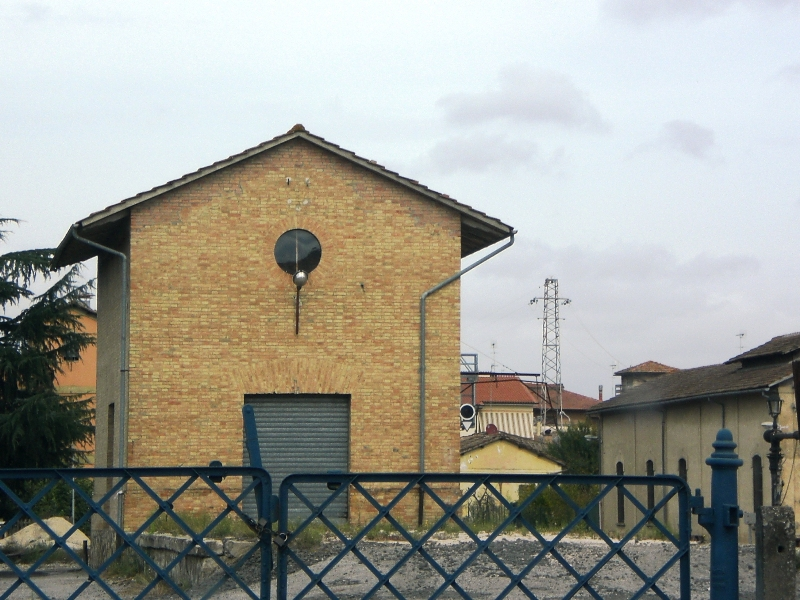
The disused freight warehouse, seen from platform 1.

== See also ==
- History of rail transport in Italy
- List of railway stations in Tuscany
- Rail transport in Italy
- Railway stations in Italy
