= Quercianella–Sonnino railway station =

Railway station in Italy

Coordinates: 43.4550°N 10.3728°E

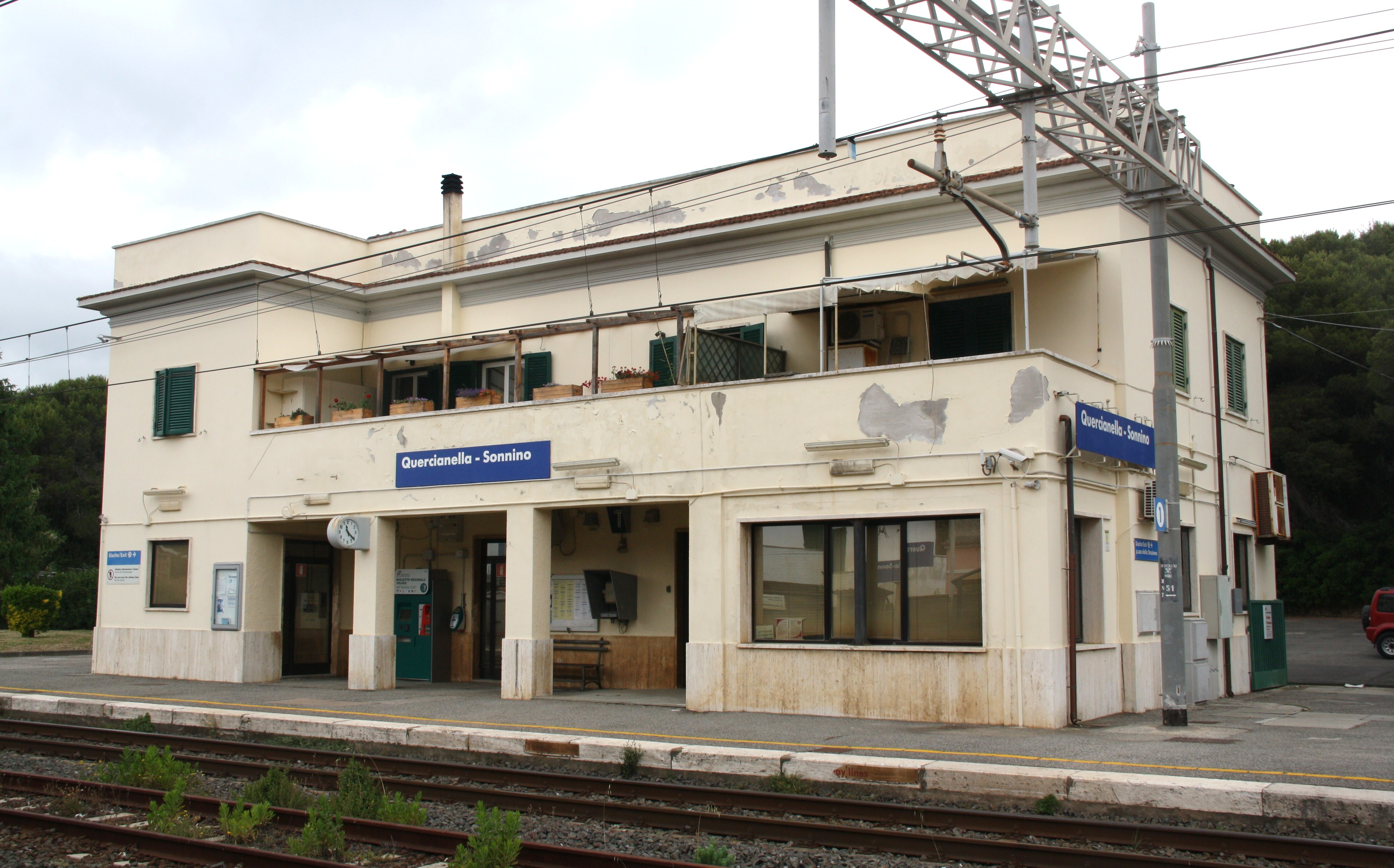
- Quercianella–Sonnino railway station

General information
- Location: Italy
Location

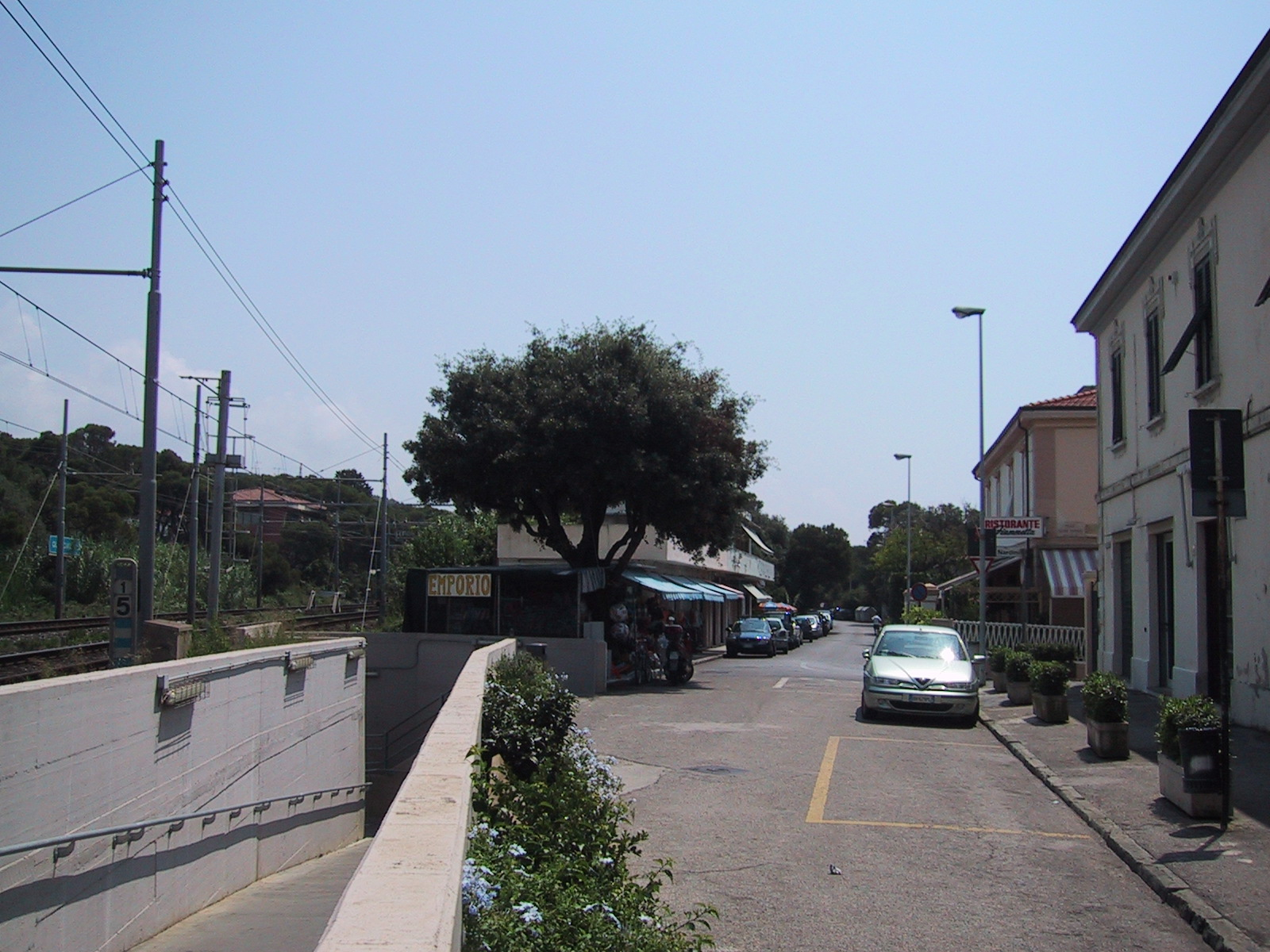
Railway crossing from Quercianella to the station

Quercianella–Sonnino railway station, on the Pisa–Livorno–Rome railway line, serves Quercianella, a small village on the Etruscan coast between Antignano and Castiglioncello few kilometers south of Livorno. The trip from Pisa can take as little as half an hour and one hour and a half from Florence. The easy access has made Quercianella a favourite location for summer vacations.
