= Follonica railway station =

Railway station in Italy

Follonica
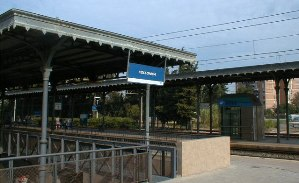

General information
- Location: Piazza Don Giovanni Minzoni; Follonica 58022; Grosseto, Tuscany; Italy
- Coordinates: 42°55′35″N 10°45′21″E
- Operator: Rete Ferroviaria Italiana; Trenitalia
- Line: Tirrenica
- Tracks: 3

Other information
- Classification: Silver

History
- Opened: 12 November 1863; 162 years ago
Location
- Location within Tuscany Location within Italy

Follonica railway station is an Italian railway station on the Tirrenica railway line, located in the town of Follonica, Province of Grosseto, Tuscany.

== History ==
The station opened on 12 November 1863 along with the section of the Pisa–Rome railway from San Vincenzo to Follonica. The subsequent extension to Orbetello was inaugurated on 15 June 1864.

== Train services and movements ==
Regular passenger services to the station consist of regionale, regionale veloce, Intercity and Frecciabianca services, which run frequently to Grosseto, Pisa Centrale, Roma Termini, and Florence SMN.

== See also ==
- History of rail transport in Italy
- List of railway stations in Tuscany
- Rail transport in Italy
- Railway stations in Italy
