= 2017 Livorno floods =

- Date: 9–10 September 2017
- Location: Livorno, Tuscany
- Deaths: 8 deaths

The 2017 Livorno floods took place in Livorno, Italy between 9 and 10 September 2017, causing the death of eight people. The floods were caused by an unusually heavy storm that began on the evening of 9 September and continued on 10 September, and caused over 250 millimeters of rain to fall between 2:00 A.M. and 4:00 A.M. This resulted in the Rio Maggiore and the Rio Ardenza overflowing. The surrounding areas, such as the municipality of Collesalvetti, were also affected by flooding.

== Damage and casualties ==
The floods inundated roads and the city's train station. They caused landslides, damaged water and gas infrastructure, and forced four people from their homes. Schools in the city temporarily closed. Eight people died: four of the victims were in a flat on Viale Nazario Sauro, two of them were near the Ardenza between Stillo and Sant'Alò, one of them was in the Collinaia area, and one was near the Church of the Apparition.

== Eni refinery leak ==
Tuscany's environmental agency, the Agenzia regionale per la protezione ambientale della Toscana (ARPAT), reported that the water in Livorno's port had become contaminated with hydrocarbons because of leakages from the city's Eni refinery due to the floods. ARPAT and the city's port authority conducted an inspection and activated a cleanup team to remove the hydrocarbons.

== Reactions ==
Prime Minister Paolo Gentiloni posted a message on Twitter showing his closeness to Livorno, and Livorno mayor Filippo Nogarin successfully requested a state of emergency declaration. He also stated "We didn't expect this situation because the alert given by the Civil Defence was orange, instead we woke up like this." President Sergio Mattarella said "This umpteenth calamity caused by extraordinary bad weather should prompt serious and thorough reflection in the political world as soon as possible on the effects of climate change and how to effectively defend our territory." Juventus manager Massimiliano Allegri tweeted "#Livorno, you will rise again! I am close to my fellow citizens, I hope to be of use as soon as possible #flood."
