= Orbetello Città railway station =

Former railway station in Italy

Orbetello Città
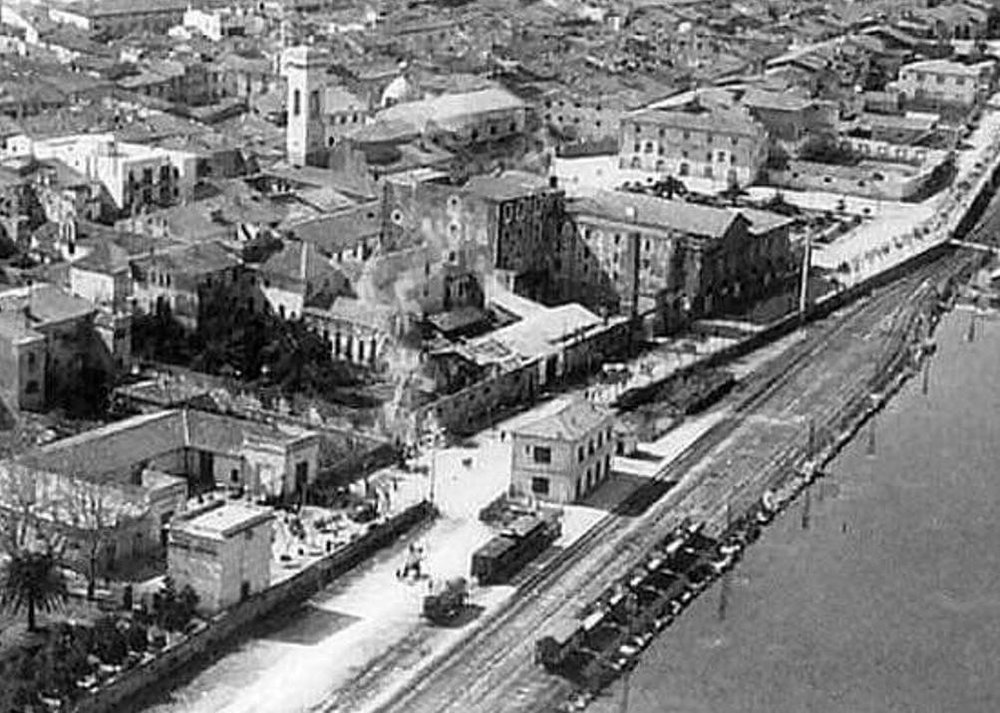

General information
- Location: Via Mura di Ponente; Orbetello, Grosseto, Tuscany; Italy
- Coordinates: 42.4401°N 11.2113°E
- Line: Orbetello–Porto Santo Stefano

History
- Opened: 1913
- Closed: 1944
Location
- Location within Tuscany Location within Italy

Orbetello Città railway station was a railway station in Orbetello, Tuscany, Italy, located on the Orbetello–Porto Santo Stefano railway. It served the town centre between 1913 and 1944.

== History ==
The station was inaugurated in 1913 to provide direct rail access to the urban centre of Orbetello, in Via Mura di Ponente. For its construction, an embankment on reclaimed coastal land was built to support the station yard.

The station was closed in 1944 following damage to the railway line during World War II and was subsequently decommissioned. Some of the original structures, including the passenger building and ancillary service buildings, survive and have been repurposed for other use.

== Sources ==
- Della Monaca, Gualtiero (2013). La ferrovia Orbetello Porto S. Stefano. Storia e immagini del trenino Baccarini. Arcidosso: C&P Adver Effigi. ISBN 9788864333823.

== See also ==
- List of railway stations in Tuscany
- History of rail transport in Italy
