= List of railway stations in Florence =

Railway stations in Florence are operated by the national railway network Rete Ferroviaria Italiana (RFI).

== Stations ==
stations include:

- Firenze Santa Maria Novella railway station
- Firenze Campo di Marte railway station
- Firenze Rifredi railway station

== See also ==
- Florence-Bologna high-speed railway line
- Florence–Rome high-speed railway
- Florence–Viareggio railway
- Florence–Pisa railway
- Autolinee Toscane which operates lines for Trenitalia and Trasporto Ferroviario Toscano (Tuscan railway authority)
