= Follonica Porto railway station =

Former railway station in Italy

Follonica Porto
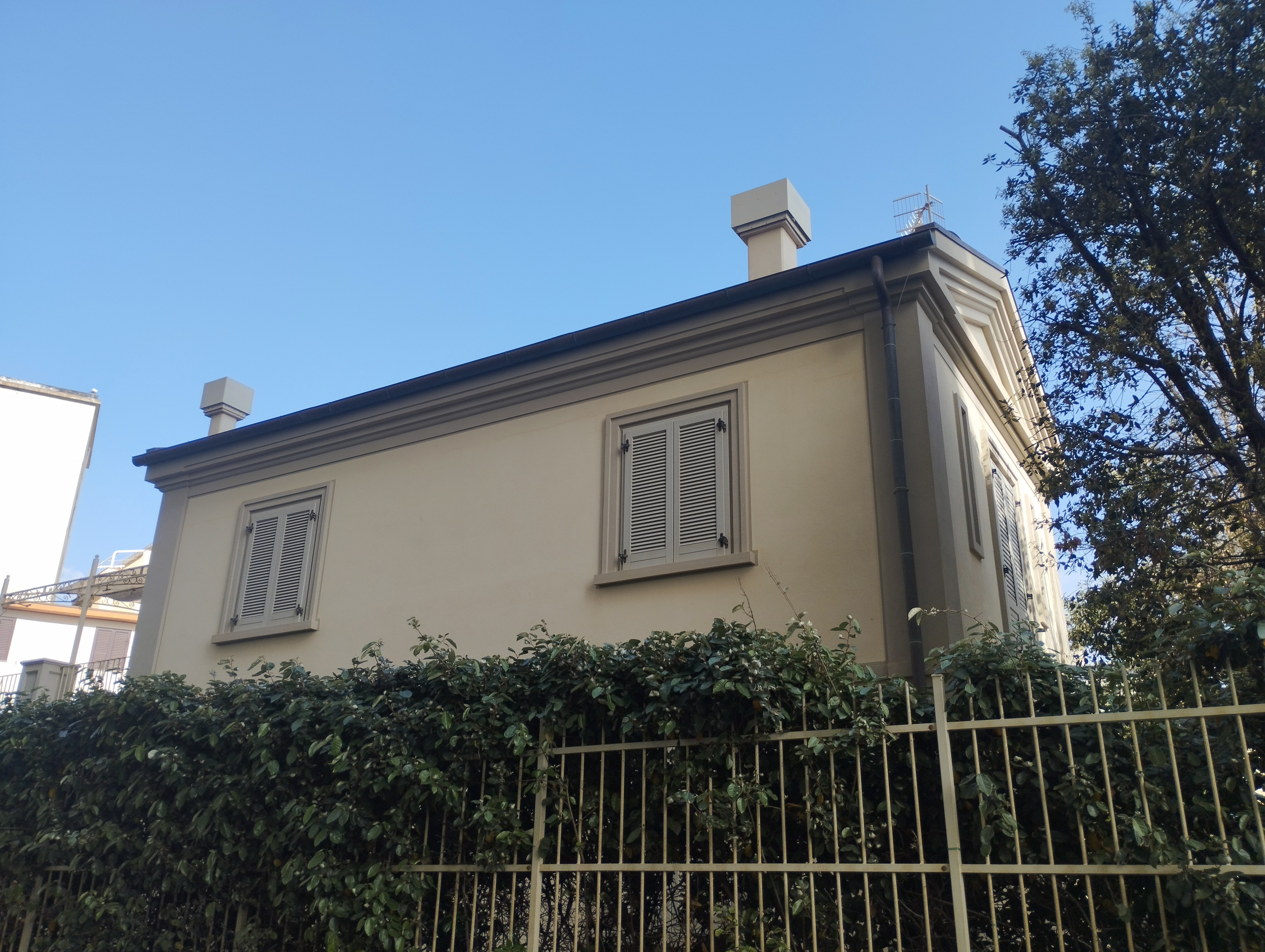

General information
- Location: Via Antonio Fratti; Follonica, Grosseto, Tuscany; Italy
- Coordinates: 42°55′20″N 10°45′17″E
- Operator: Società Anonima della Ferrovia Massa Marittima–Follonica Porto
- Line: Massa Marittima–Follonica

History
- Opened: 11 December 1902; 123 years ago
- Closed: 1948; 78 years ago
Location
- Location within Tuscany Location within Italy

Follonica Porto railway station was an Italian railway station on the Massa Marittima–Follonica railway line, located at the former port of Follonica, Province of Grosseto, Tuscany.

== History ==
The station opened on 11 December 1902 along with the inauguration of the Massa Marittima–Follonica railway, which connected the town of Massa Marittima with the port of Follonica.

Previously, a watchtower documented since 1575 stood on this site, which was subsequently rebuilt under the orders of Grand Duke Leopold II starting in 1826, serving as the residence of the commander of the coastal military garrison. The structure was demolished to facilitate the construction of the station.

The station served as the southern terminus of the railway and was primarily used for freight traffic from the mines of Val d'Aspra to the Tyrrhenian Sea. The building, located just a few meters from the sea, stood near a pier that allowed goods to be loaded directly onto the ships.

The station closed in 1944, along with the entire line, and was ultimately declared defunct in 1948. The building has been converted into a private residence.

== See also ==
- History of rail transport in Italy
- List of railway stations in Tuscany
- Rail transport in Italy
- Railway stations in Italy
