= Isola d'Arbia =

- Frazione
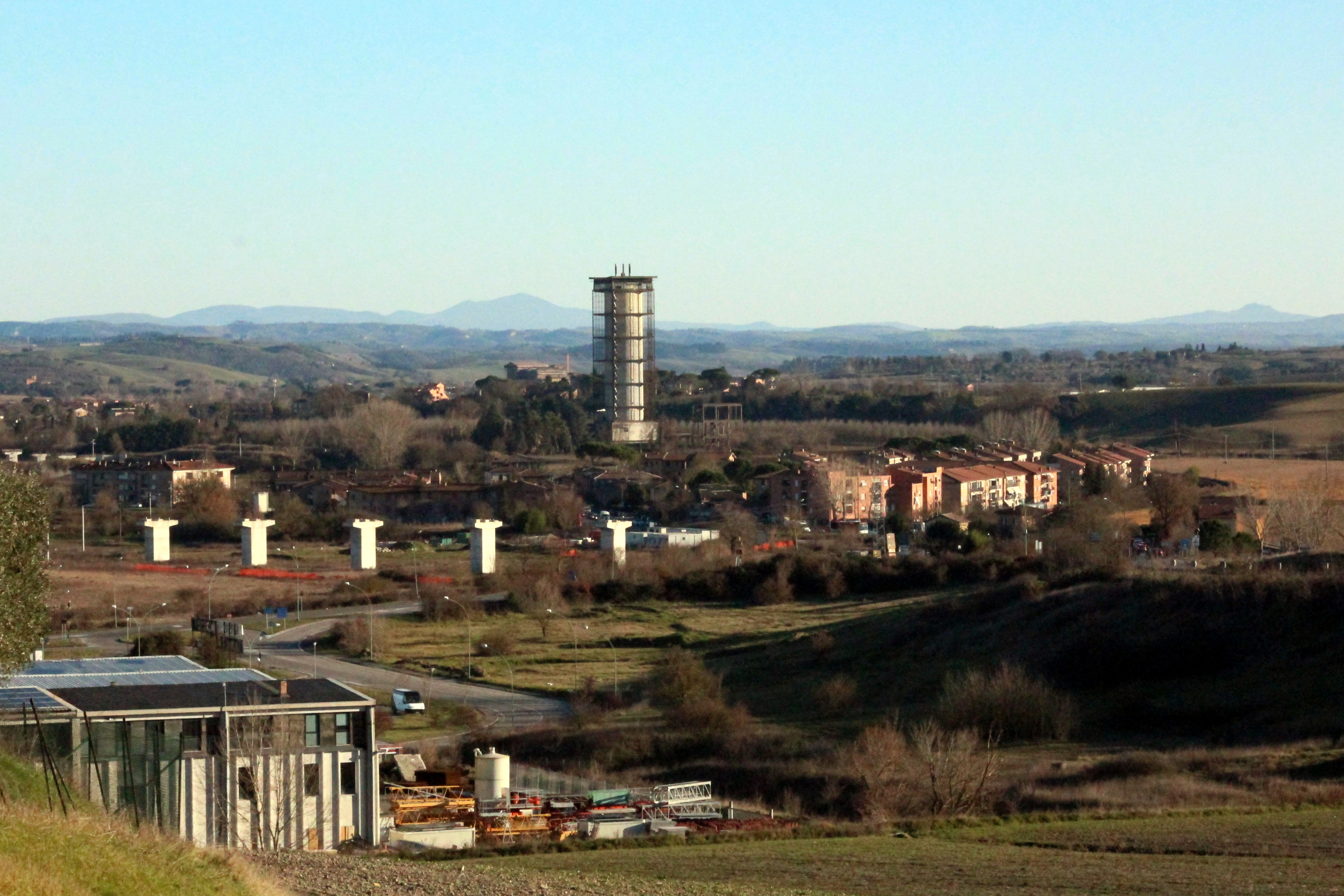
- View of Isola d'Arbia

- Location of Isola d'Arbia in Italy
- Coordinates: 43°15′31″N 11°22′48″E
- Country: Italy
- Region: Tuscany
- Province: Siena (SI)
- Comune: Siena
- Elevation: 176 m (577 ft)

Population (2011)
  - Total: 1,060
- Time zone: UTC+1 (CET)
  - Summer (DST): UTC+2 (CEST)

Isola d'Arbia is a village in Tuscany, central Italy, administratively a frazione of the comune of Siena, province of Siena. At the time of the 2001 census its population was 909.

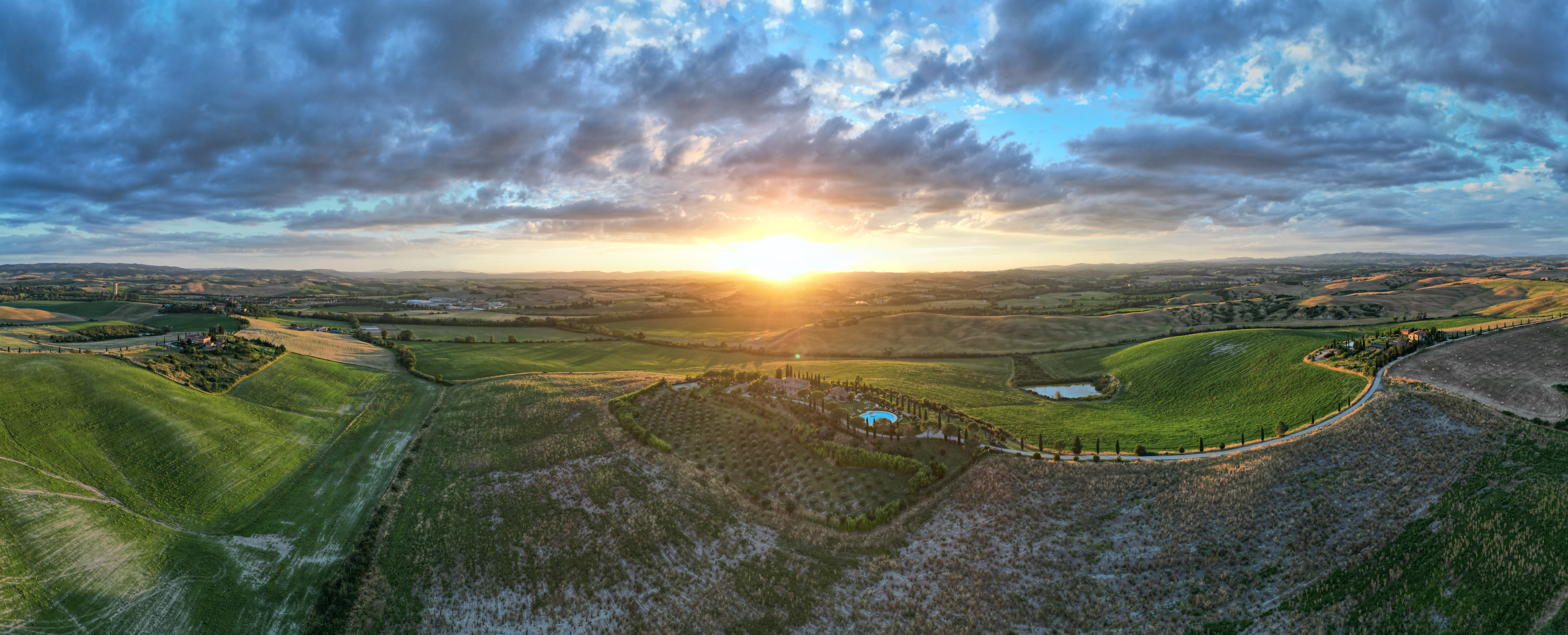
Isola d'Arbia from above. June 2024.

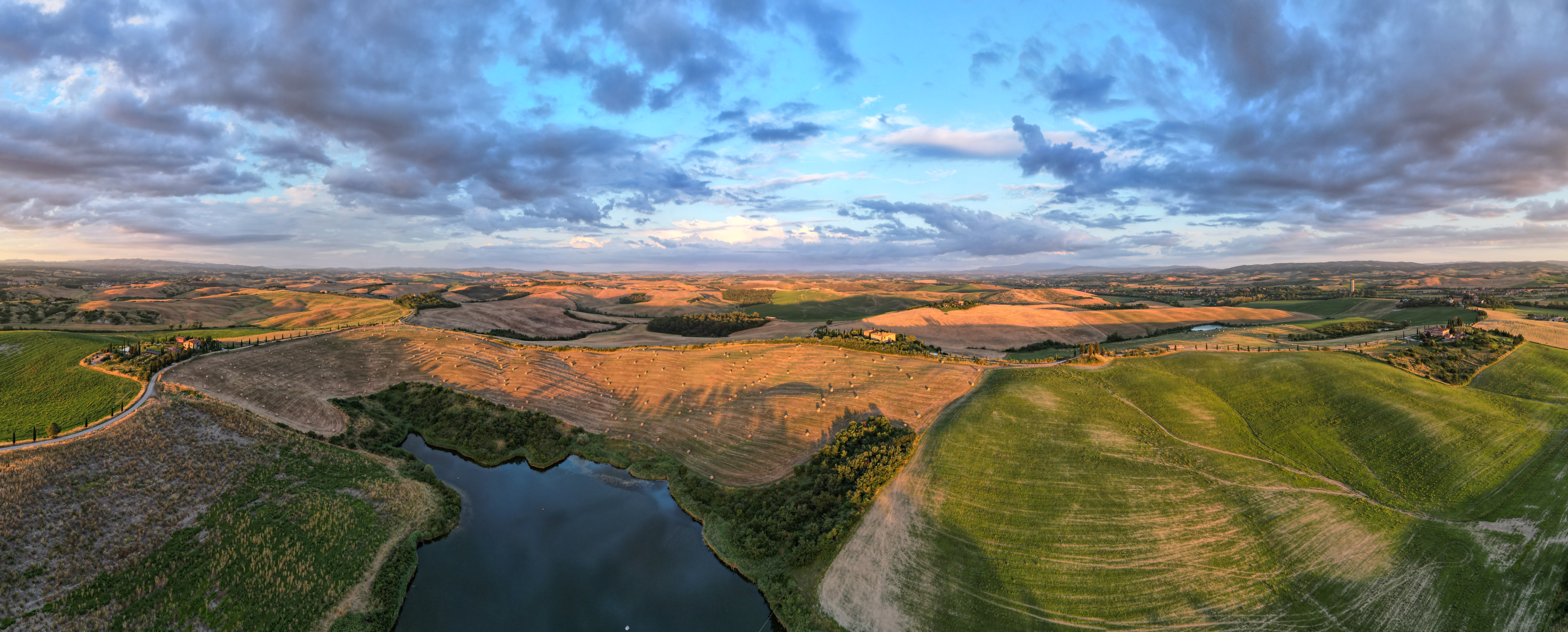
Isola d'Arbia, sunset panorama from above. June 2024.

Isola d'Arbia is about 10 km from Siena.
