= Antignano railway station =

Railway station in Italy

Antignano
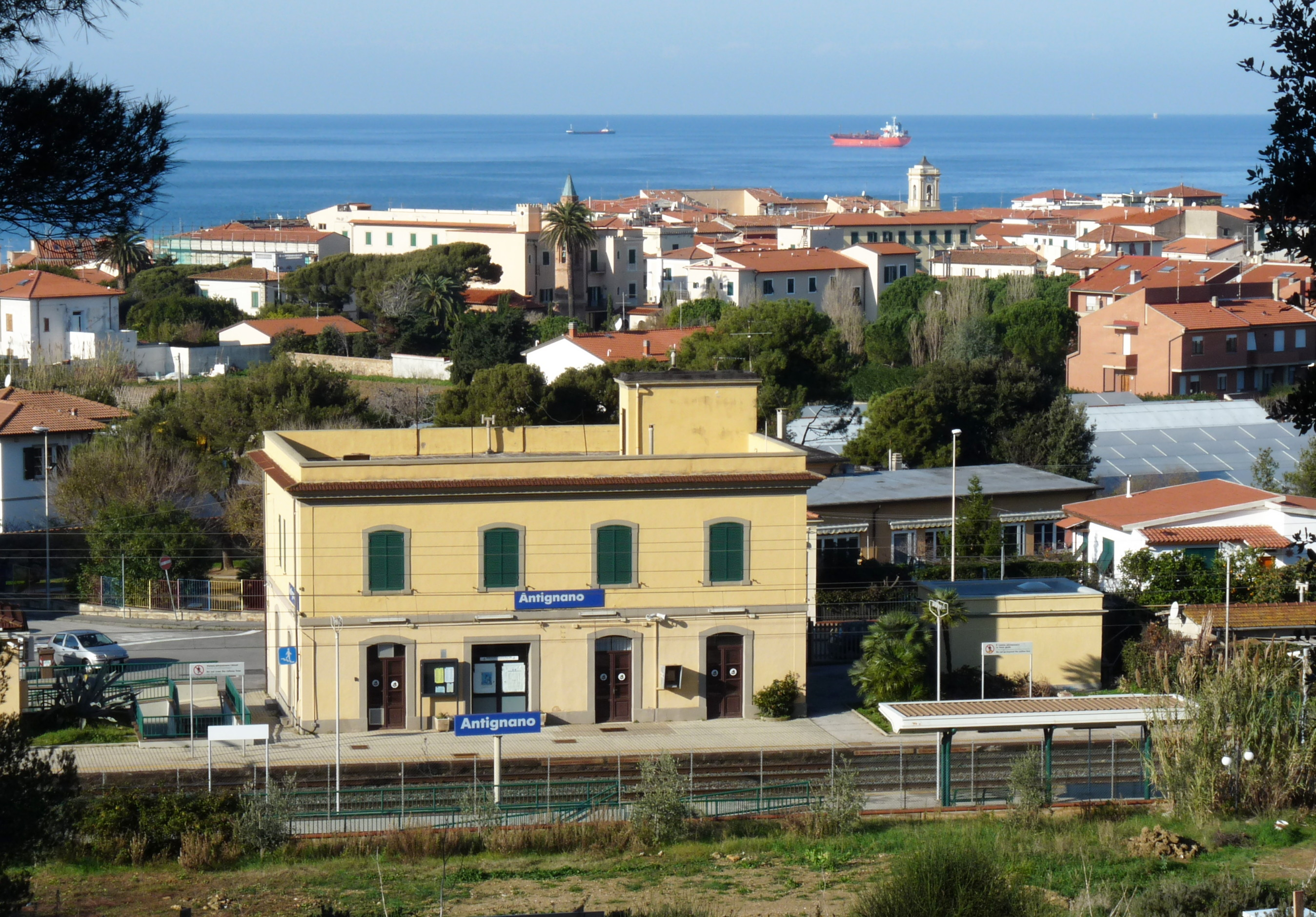
- The station viewed from above, in 2009

General information
- Location: Via Delfino Cinelli; Livorno; Italy
- Coordinates: 43°29′43.44″N 10°19′44.40″E
- Elevation: 3 metres (9.8 ft)
- Owner: RFI
- Line: Roma-Pisa railway
- Distance: 21.055 kilometres (13.083 mi)
- Platforms: 2
- Train operators: Trenitalia

History
- Opened: 1909
Location

Antignano railway station is a secondary railway station, situated in the frazione of Antignano, Livorno, in Italy.

== History ==
The station was opened in 1910, one year after the inauguration of the coastal section of the railway.

== Current use ==
The station has no personnel, but there are automatic ticket machines. Only some regional trains stop at the station.
