= Riotorto, Piombino =

Riotorto
- Frazione
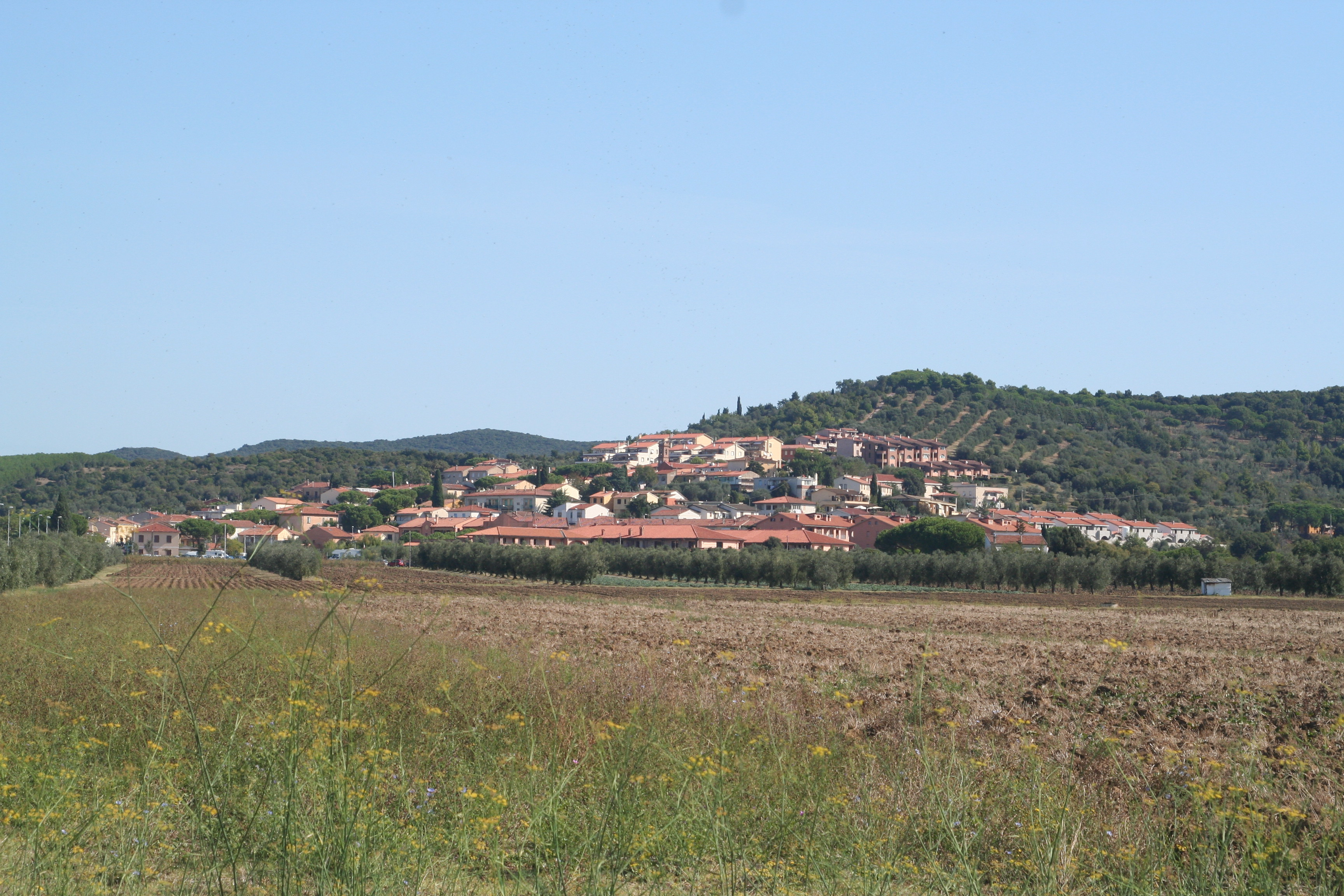
- View of Riotorto

- Location of Riotorto in Italy
- Coordinates: 42°58′27″N 10°40′51″E
- Country: Italy
- Region: Tuscany
- Province: Livorno (LI)
- Comune: Piombino
- Elevation: 52 m (171 ft)

Population (2011)
  - Total: 1,445
- Time zone: UTC+1 (CET)
  - Summer (DST): UTC+2 (CEST)
- Postal code: 57025
- Dialing code: (+39) 0565

Riotorto is a town in Tuscany, central Italy, administratively a frazione of the comune of Piombino, province of Livorno. At the time of the 2011 census its population was 1,445.

Riotorto is about 80 km from Livorno and 15 km from Piombino.

== Transports ==
- Vignale–Riotorto railway station

== Bibliography ==
- "Riotorto: storia e natura a due passi dal mare".
