= Quercianella =

- Frazione
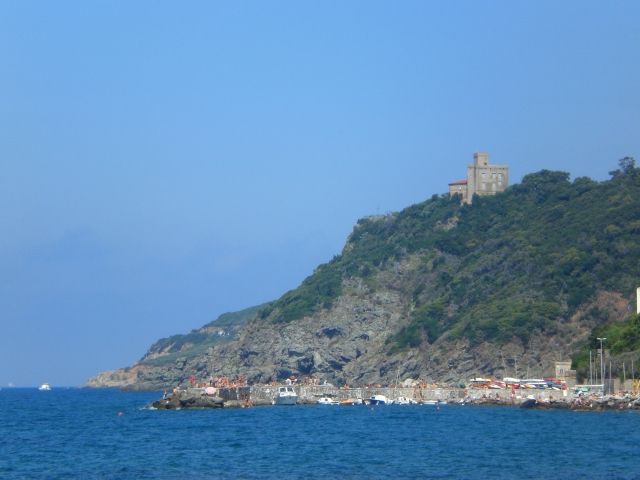
- View of the coast and of the Sonnino's Castle

- Location of Quercianella in Italy
- Coordinates: 43°27′27″N 10°22′05″E
- Country: Italy
- Region: Tuscany
- Province: Livorno (LI)
- Comune: Livorno
- Elevation: 22 m (72 ft)

Population
  - Total: 1,109
- Demonym: Quercianellesi
- Time zone: UTC+1 (CET)
  - Summer (DST): UTC+2 (CEST)
- Postal code: 57128
- Dialing code: 0586
- Patron saint: Saint Anne

Quercianella is a frazione of the comune of Livorno, in the province of Livorno, Tuscany, Italy. It represents the extreme south of Livorno, and is separated from the city by a stretch of rocky coastline denominated "Il Romito." The frazione is located a few kilometers north of Castiglioncello.

The suburb is known for its clean water and the Villa Jana, a castle-like mansion.

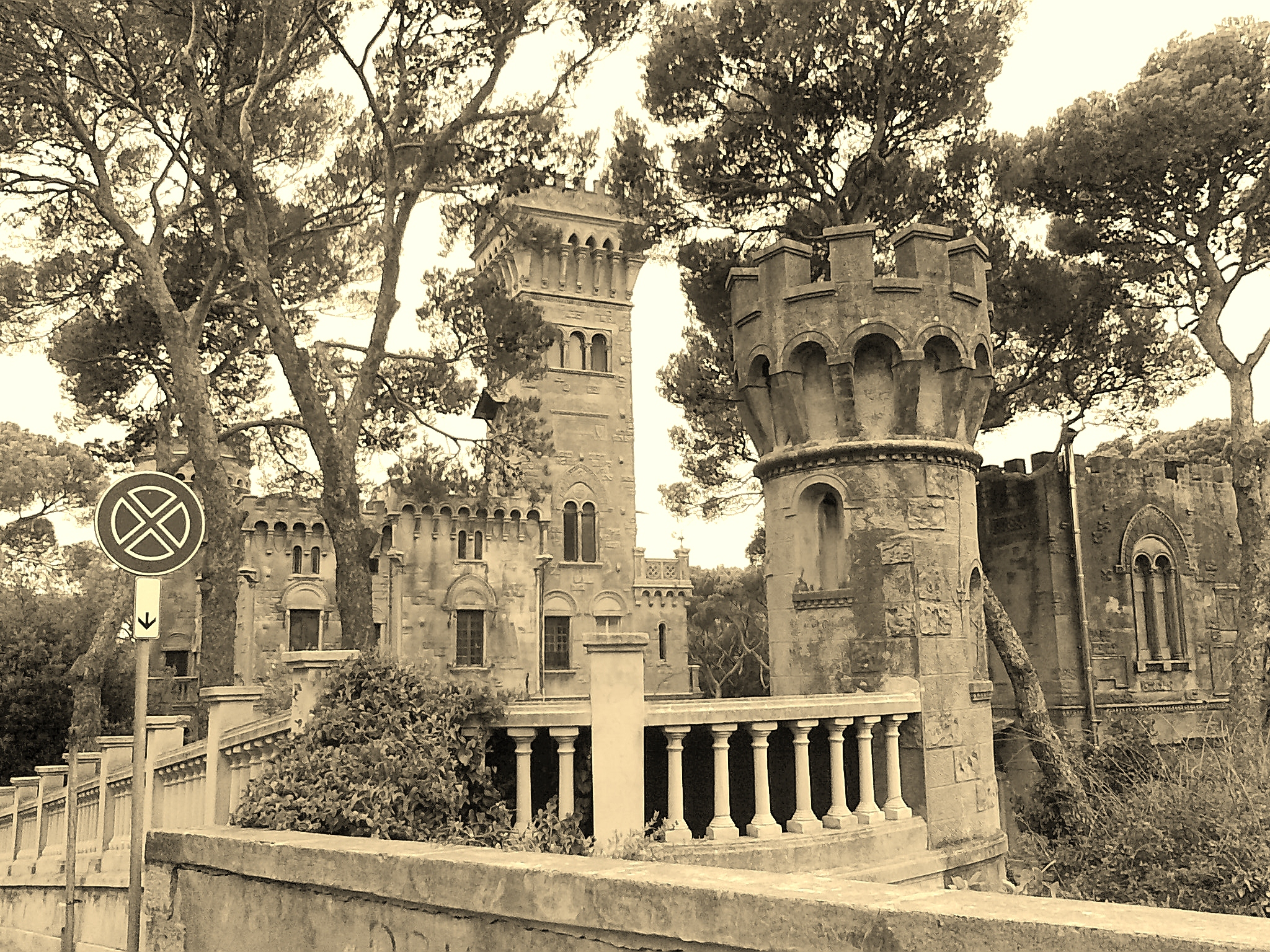
Villa Jana
