= Siena–Grosseto railway =

Railway line in Italy

Siena-Grosseto railway line
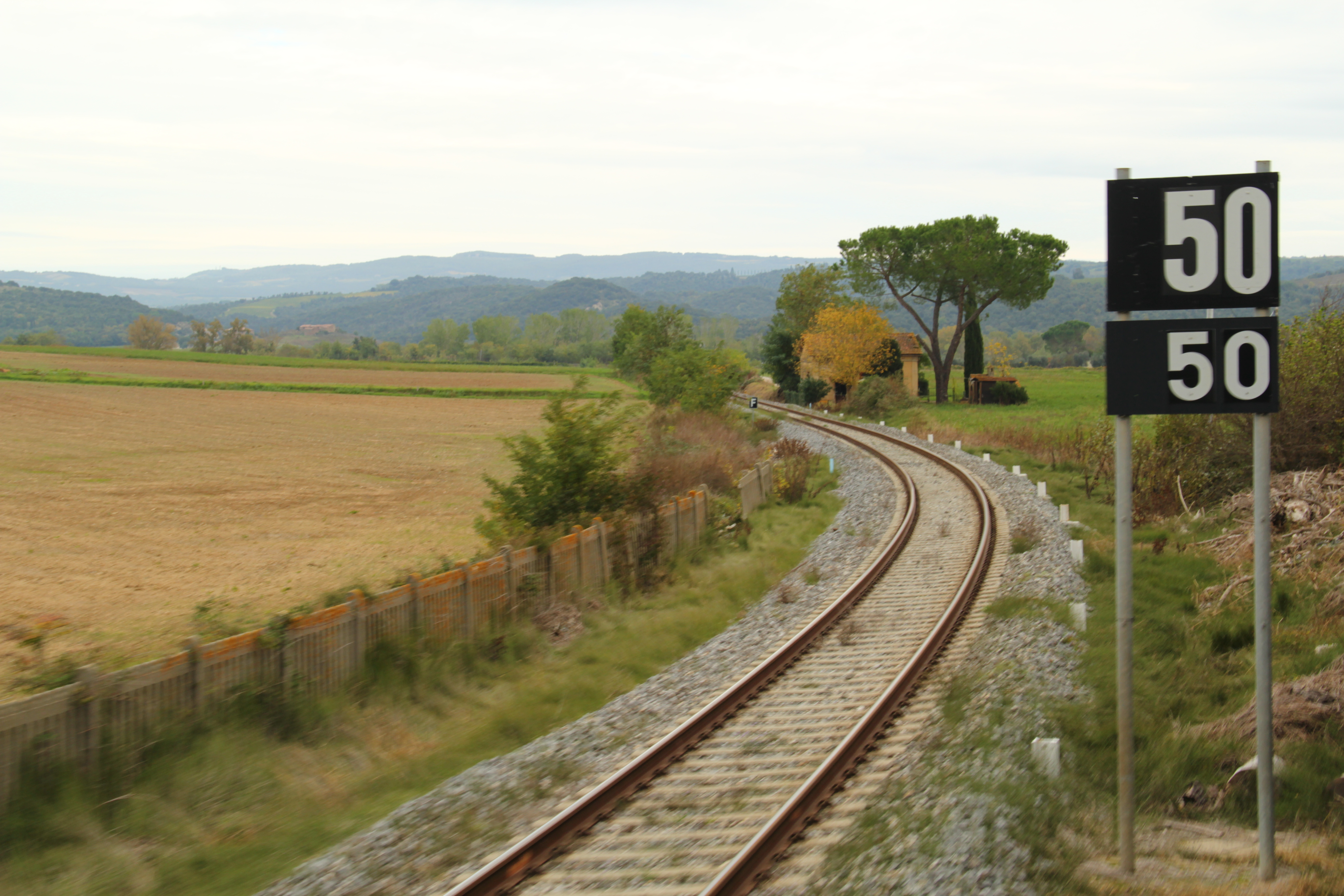
- The line near Monte Antico

Overview
- Status: in use
- Owner: Rete Ferroviaria Italiana
- Locale: Tuscany, Italy
- Termini: Siena; Grosseto

Service
- Type: Heavy rail

History
- Opened: 1872 (Montepescali-Monte Antico) 1927 (Monte Antico-Siena)

Technical
- Number of tracks: 1
- Track gauge: 1,435 mm (4 ft 8 1/2 in) standard gauge
- Electrification: no

The Siena-Grosseto railway line is an Italian railway line that connects the cities of Siena and Grosseto in Southern Tuscany.

== History ==
The first connection between Siena and Grosseto was completed in 1872 by the Società per le Strade Ferrate Romane, first using the Central Tuscan Railway down to Asciano, before using the whole length of the Asciano-Monte Antico railway up to Monte Antico and continuing to Montepescali on the Tirrenica railway, before using this line to run into Grosseto.

In 1906, a proposal was submitted to construct a faster line between Monte Antico and Siena via Buonconvento. The contract to construct this line was awarded in 1910 to the Société Française de Chemins de Fer en Toscane, and the line began construction in 1923. Two years later, the contract was modified and the Società Italiana per Imprese Ferroviarie e Lavori Pubblici (SIF) was awarded the contract to finish the line, which it completed in 1927. The line was inaugurated on 30 May 1927, and served the old Madonnina Rossa station in Siena until the new station was completed in 1935.

The line suffered serious damage during the Second World War and was only reopened in 1951. In 1955, the FS took over operation of the line. On 16 June 1966, floods damaged large sections of the line, and along with the Asciano-Monte Antico railway, the line did not reopen until May 1980, during which period the line was modernised.

In October 2013, a flood washed away the trackbed near Murlo station, which meant the line was closed for a year between Buonconvento and Montepescali. The line has also been victim to other floods more recently that have caused the line to be temporarily closed on multiple occasions. Most recently, the line was closed between Buonconvento and Montepescali between 21 December 2022 and 10 December 2023 due to landslides between Buonconvento and Monte Antico. When service was reinstated on 10 December 2023, the service was reduced to only four direct trains between Siena and Grosseto, the remainder terminating at Buonconvento. Also, the station at Murlo had no scheduled trains for the entirety of the 2023-2024 timetable, these being reinstated from the next timetable change, though limited.

== Traffic ==
The line is served by regionale trains operated by Trenitalia, which primarily connect Siena, Buonconvento and Grosseto. Some early morning and evening services continue to Empoli and Florence. On selected dates, Treno Natura historic steam trains are operated that use sections of this line as well as the Asciano-Monte Antico line.

== Gallery ==
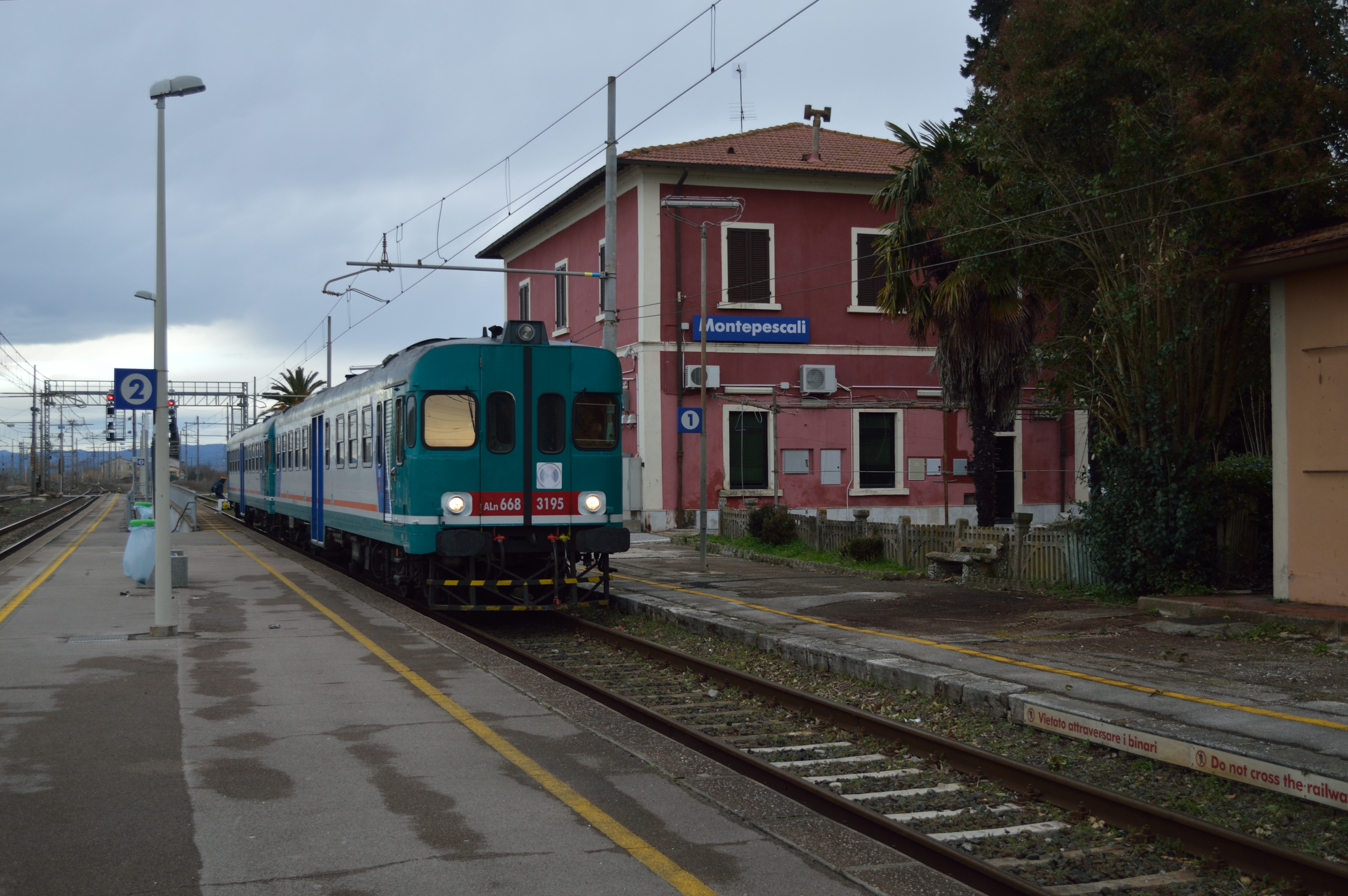
A diesel railcar on a Siena-Grosseto regionale service calls at the junction of Montepescali.

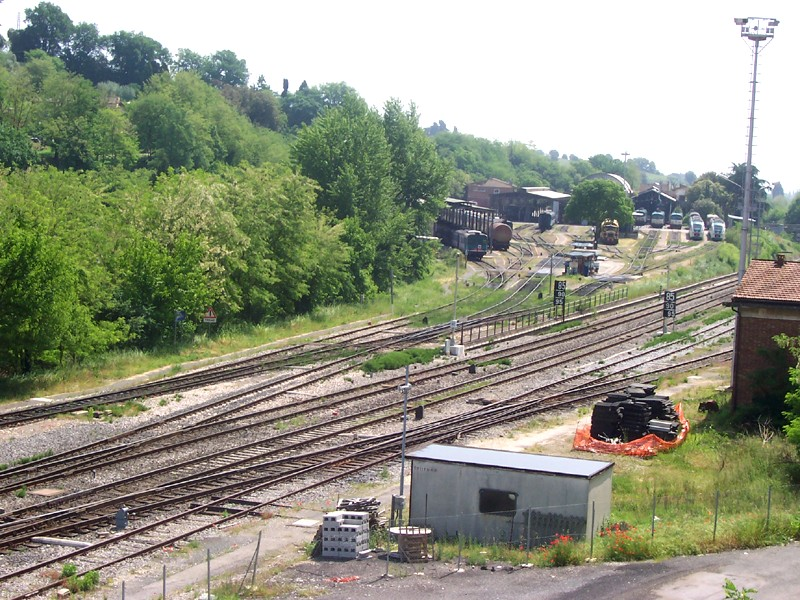
The depot of Siena showing the lines (closest to the camera) that run to Chiusi and Grosseto via Monte Antico respectively.

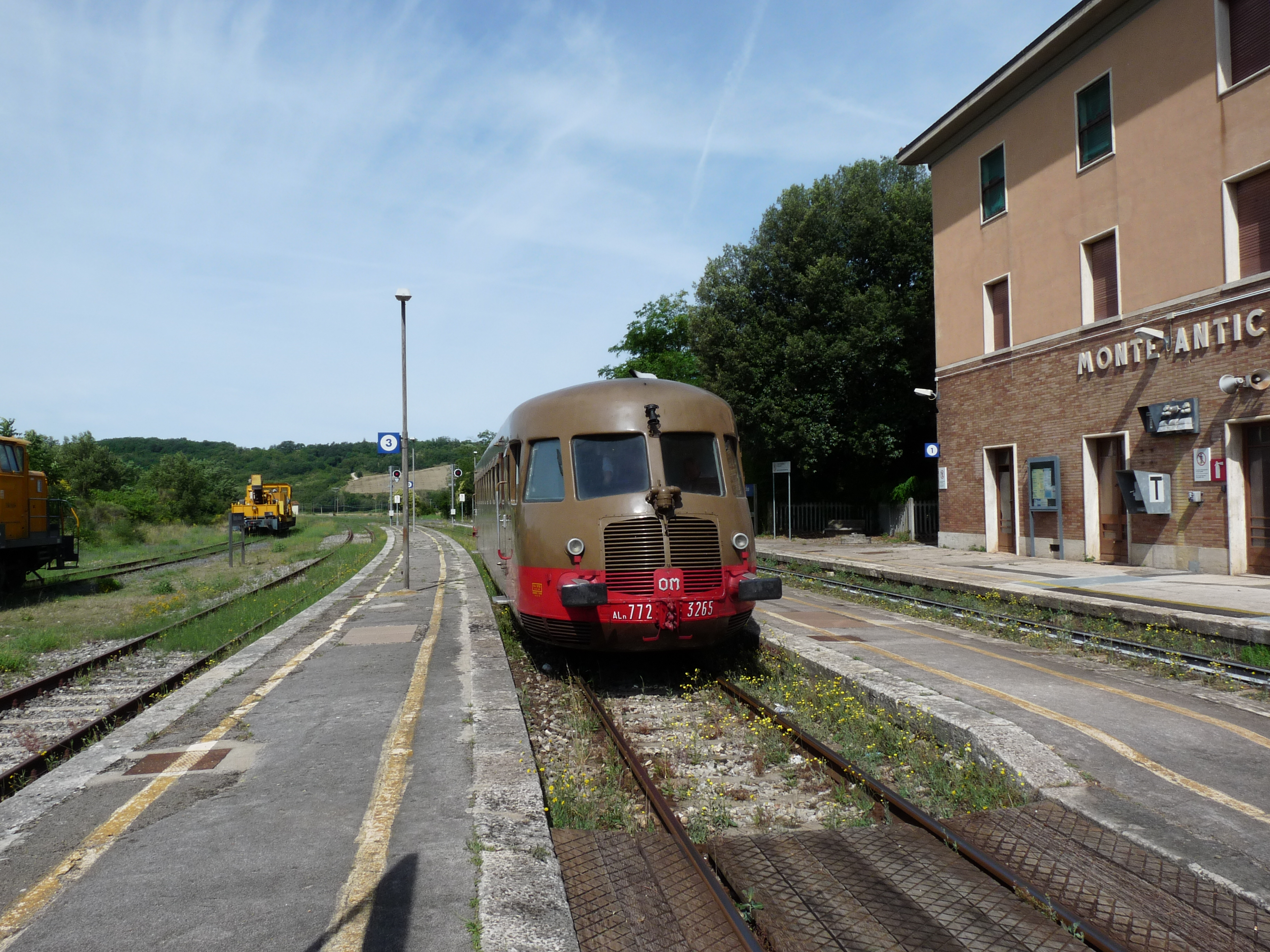
A historic diesel railcar stands at Monte Antico.

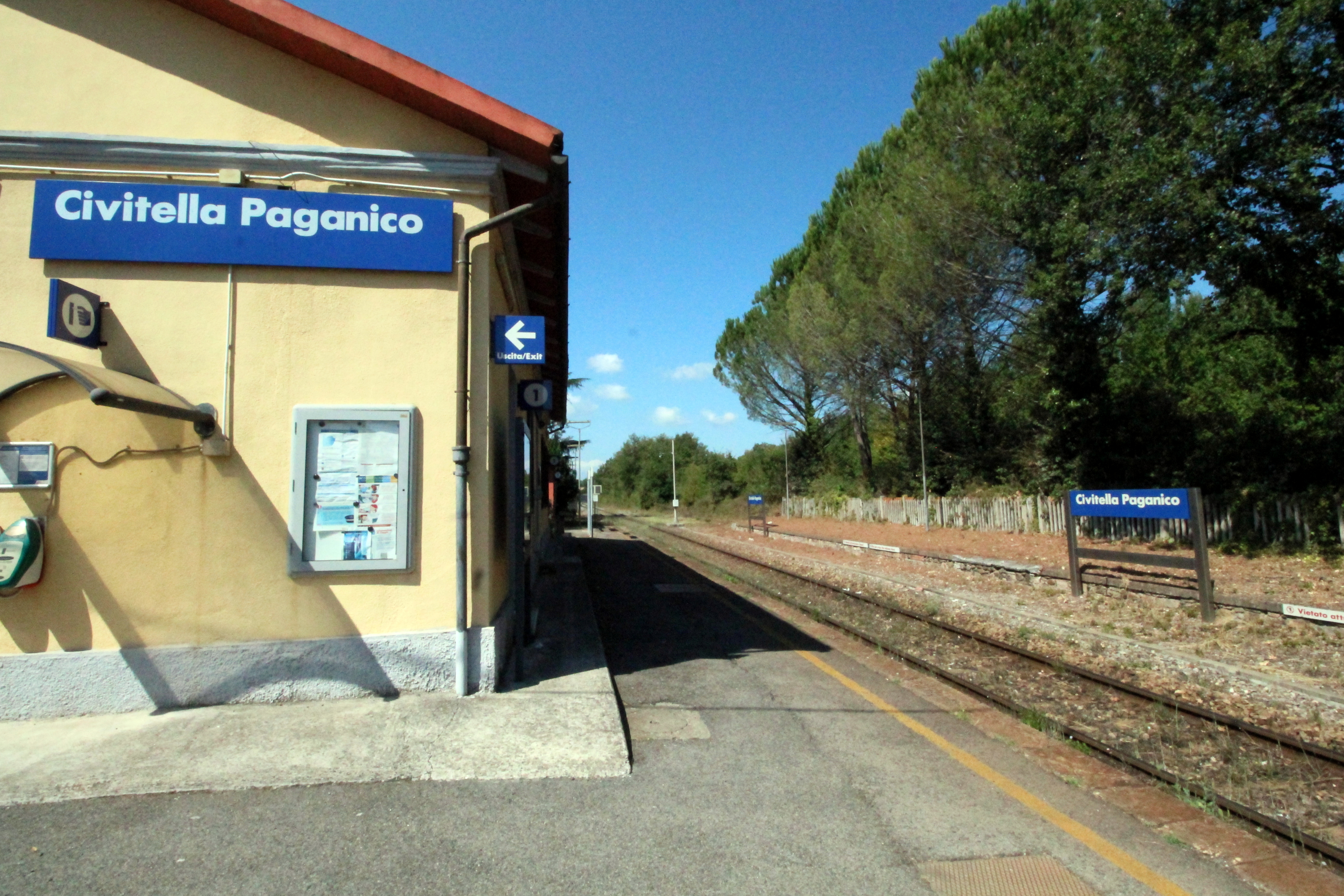
Civitella Paganico railway station.

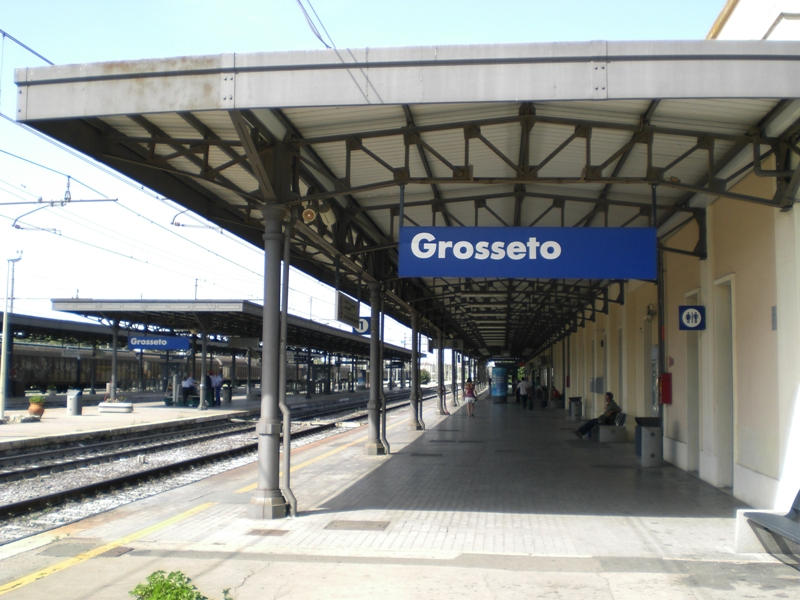
Grosseto railway station, seen from platform 1.
