= Follonica =

- Comune
- Città di Follonica
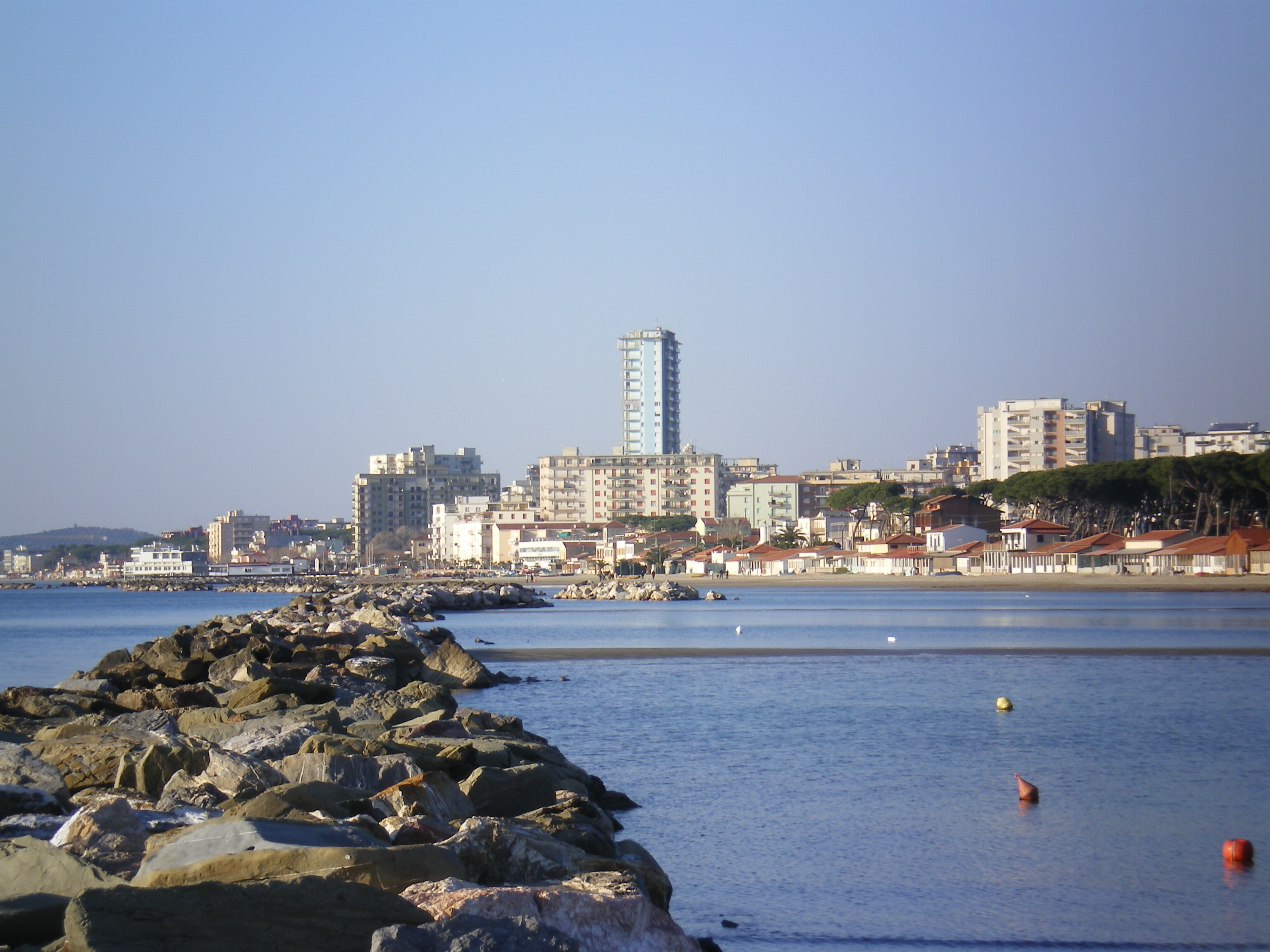

- Location within Italy Location within Tuscany
- Coordinates: 42°55′08.76″N 10°45′42.76″E
- Country: Italy
- Region: Tuscany
- Province: Grosseto (GR)

Government
  - Mayor: Andrea Benini

Area
  - Total: 55.84 km^{2} (21.56 sq mi)
- Elevation: 4 m (13 ft)

Population (30 April 2025)
  - Total: 20,102
  - Density: 360.0/km^{2} (932.4/sq mi)
- Demonym: Follonichesi
- Time zone: UTC+1 (CET)
  - Summer (DST): UTC+2 (CEST)
- Postal code: 58022
- Dialing code: 0566
- Patron saint: St. Leopold
- Saint day: November 15
- Website: Official website

Follonica (Italian pronunciation: [folˈlɔːnika]) is a town and comune (township) of province of Grosseto in the Italian region of Tuscany, on the Gulf of Follonica (Golfo di Follonica), about 40 kilometres (25 mi) northwest of the city of Grosseto.

== History ==
It was founded in 1834 by Grand Duke Leopold II of Tuscany for the workers of a new ironworks plant. However, the area was already settled in Etruscan and Roman times, and a medieval castle (Castello di Valli), whose ruins overlook now the modern town from a nearby hill, existed since at least 884. Until 1923 it was a frazione of Massa Marittima.

== Economy ==
=== Tourism ===
Follonica is a tourist site during the summer, mostly visited by the Italians themselves, lately, it has been visited from other people from other countries, such as Germany, France and United Kingdom. The city has been awarded the Bandiera Blu ("Blue Flag") every year from 2000 to 2007 for the cleanliness of its beaches and seawater.

== Government ==
=== List of mayors ===
Mayor	Term start	Term end	Party
Giò Batta Santini	1944	1948	Italian Socialist Party
Milton Bartoli	1948	1951	Italian Socialist Party
Dino Tesi	1951	1956	Italian Socialist Party
Osvaldo Bianchi	1956	1963	Italian Socialist Party
Giovanni Coppola	1963	1966	Italian Socialist Party
Dino Abati	1966	1970	Italian Republican Party
Ovidio Angeluccetti	1970	1980	Italian Communist Party
Massimo Corti	1980	1983	Italian Socialist Party
Lorenzo Chelini	1983	1987	Italian Communist Party
Enrico Norcini	1987	1995	Italian Communist Party/Democratic Party of the Left
Emilio Bonifazi	1995	2004	Democratic Party of the Left/The Daisy
Claudio Saragosa	2004	2009	Democrats of the Left/Democratic Party
Eleonora Baldi	2009	2014	Democratic Party
Andrea Benini	2014	Incumbent	Democratic Party

== Main sights ==
- Church of San Leopoldo, built by will of duke Leopold II of Tuscany starting from 1836
- Castle of Valli, built in the 8th century as residence of the bishops of Lucca; later it was owned by the Aldobrandeschi who, in the 13th century, sold it to the Republic of Pisa. In the 14th century it was a fortress of the Principality of Piombino until, in 1815, it became part of the Grand Duchy of Tuscany.
- Pievaccia, remains of a large fortified medieval monastery.

== Sport ==
USD Follonica Gavorrano born of the merger between the teams of Gavorrano and Follonica, militant in Serie D.

== Transports ==
Road

The Via Aurelia highway (SS 1), which runs from Rome to the Franco-Italian border, passes close by the city.

Train

The Pisa–Rome railway runs through the city, providing direct railway connections to the cities of Grosseto, Rome, Pisa and Livorno, among others. The train station opened in 1863. The city was also served by a secondary station located at the pier by the sea, the Follonica Porto station on the Massa Marittima–Follonica line, which was closed at the end of World War II.

== Sister cities ==
- Charleroi, Belgium
- Kołobrzeg, Poland
- Hedemora, Sweden
