= Grosseto railway station =

Railway station in Grosseto, Italy

Grosseto
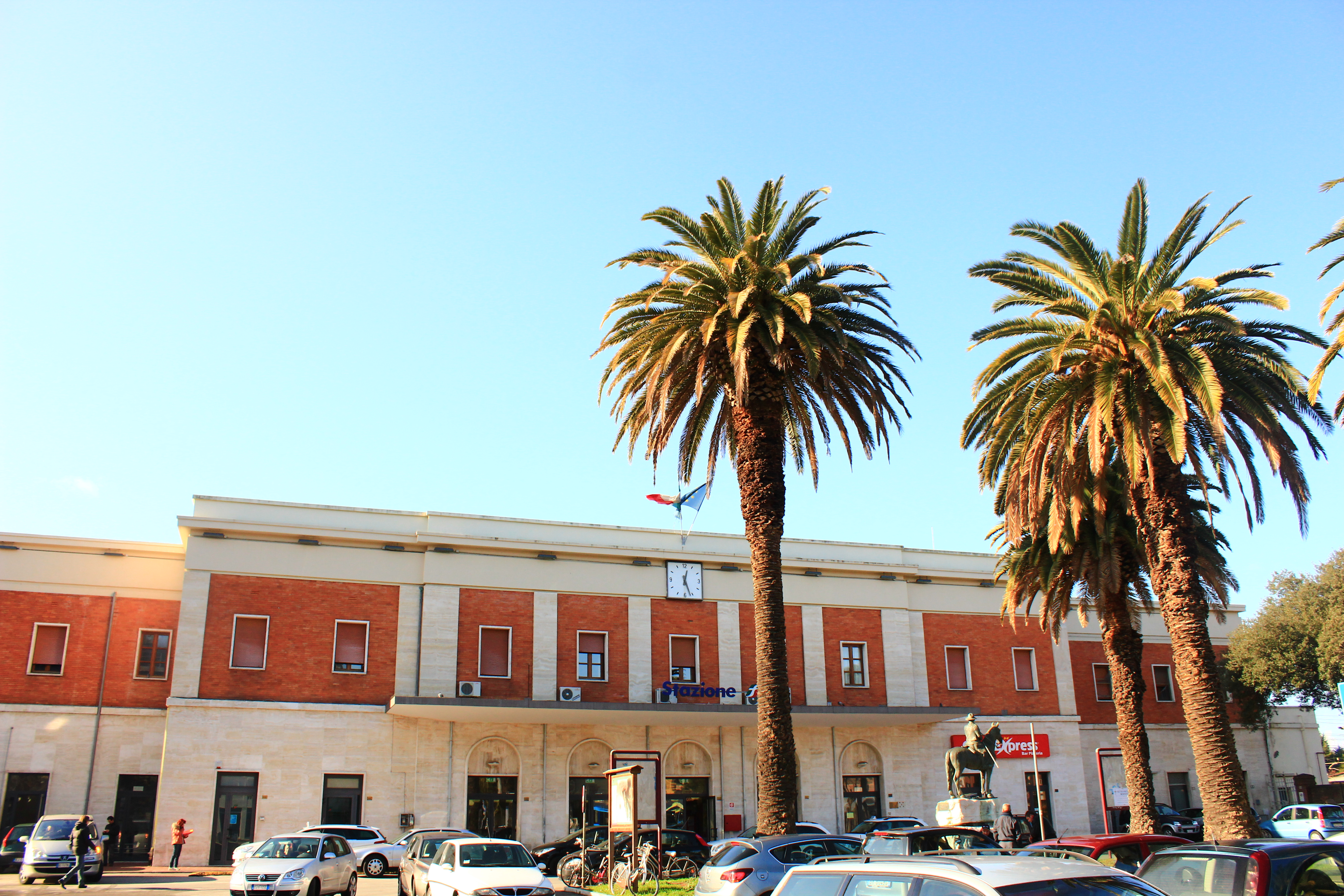
- View of the passenger building

General information
- Location: Piazza Guglielmo Marconi; 58100 Grosseto GR; Grosseto, Grosseto, Tuscany; Italy
- Coordinates: 42°46′03″N 11°06′24″E
- Operator: Rete Ferroviaria Italiana; Centostazioni
- Lines: Pisa–Rome; Siena-Grosseto
- Distance: 187.644 km (116.597 mi) from Roma Termini
- Train operators: Trenitalia
- Connections: Urban and suburban buses

Other information
- Classification: Gold

History
- Opened: 15 June 1864; 162 years ago
Location
- Location within Tuscany Location within Italy

Grosseto railway station (Italian: Stazione di Grosseto) is the main station serving the city and comune of Grosseto, in the region of Tuscany, central Italy. Opened in 1864, it forms part of the Pisa–Rome railway.

The station is currently managed by Rete Ferroviaria Italiana (RFI). However, the commercial area of the passenger building is managed by Centostazioni. Train services to and from the station are operated by Trenitalia. Each of these companies is a subsidiary of Ferrovie dello Stato (FS), Italy's state-owned rail company.

The Pisa–Rome railway is a double track main line connecting Pisa with the Tyrrhenian Sea and Rome. Grosseto railway station is roughly at its halfway point. The station is also one of the termini of a single-track non-electrified secondary line to Siena. That line continues on from Siena as the Central Tuscany railway, and later as the Leopolda railway, towards Empoli and Florence.

== Location ==
Grosseto railway station is situated in Piazza Guglielmo Marconi, near the centre of the city, just north of the old town.

Piazza Marconi, often erroneously referred to as Station Square, is known for its statue of a buttero (1953) by sculptor Tolomeo Faccendi.

== History ==
The station was opened on 15 June 1864, upon the opening of the Follonica–Grosseto and Grosseto–Orbetello sections of the Pisa–Livorno–Rome railway.

The railway station was heavily bombed and destroyed by the Royal Air Force in September 1943. It was reconstructed after the end of the war on a design by architect Roberto Narducci.

== Features ==
The station complex extends laterally along the western side of the square. The passenger building was re-built after being destroyed by the bombing which occurred in Grosseto in 1943. It is made up of several buildings huddled together, on two levels.

At the ground floor level, the passenger building's central facade is characterized by five portals with architraves topped by round arches. These are protected by a canopy protruding from the crease that separates the two levels of the building. At each side of the central facade are open rectangular portals. One of them leads to the bar, and the other to the waiting room.

Extending across the mezzanine level of the passenger building is a series of rectangular windows, while in the central part of the main facade at that level is a square station clock, which forms a crowning feature.

The station yard has five tracks with platforms for the boarding and alighting of passengers. There is also a large goods yard.

== Passenger and train movements ==
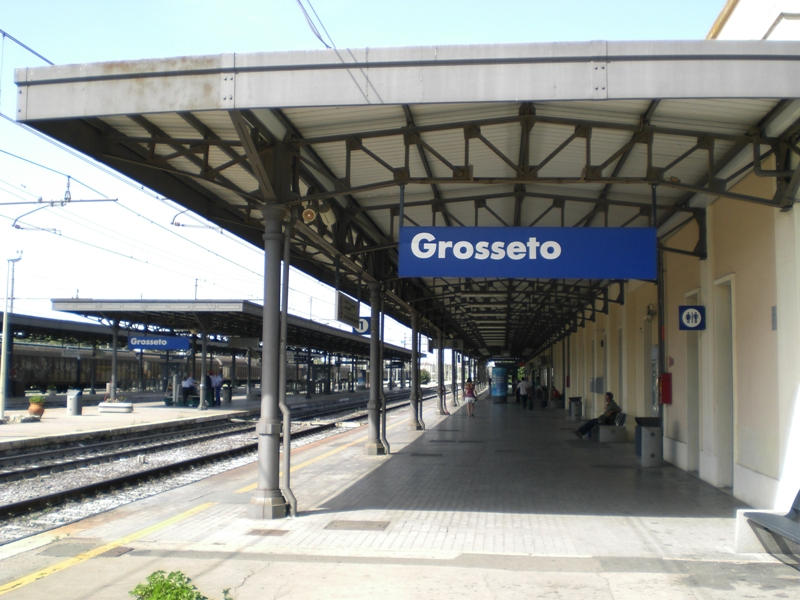
View of the main platform

The station has about 1.5 million passenger movements each year.

Trains stopping at the station include Frecciabianca trains, all InterCity trains to Torino Porta Nuova, Milano Centrale, Ventimiglia, Sestri Levante, Roma Termini, Napoli Centrale, Salerno, some express trains to southern Italy and Sicily and all the regional trains operating on the Tyrrhenian line and the secondary line to Siena.

Along the line connecting Grosseto with Siena, at Monte Antico, there is a junction with a secondary line via Buonconvento to Siena, used by passenger and cargo trains, and another line, which until 1927 was the only connection between Siena and Grosseto, which connects to the Siena-Chiusi railway at Asciano. The latter line is currently used by historic Treno Natura trains, which also operate excursions to local castles around Montalcino. Just before Siena, the line via Buonconvento and the Siena-Chiusi line converge once again to continue into Siena.

== Interchange ==
The station is the terminus of many urban and suburban bus lines operated by Autolinee Toscane, the transport company serving the whole of Tuscany.

== See also ==
- History of rail transport in Italy
- List of railway stations in Tuscany
- Rail transport in Italy
- Railway stations in Italy
