= Cafaggio =

Cafaggio may refer to:

- Cafaggio, Ameglia, a village in the province of La Spezia, Italy
- Cafaggio, Campiglia Marittima, a village in the province of Livorno, Italy
- Cafaggio, Capolona, a village in the province of Arezzo, Italy
- Cafaggio, Prato, a village in the province of Prato, Italy
