= Falchi =

Falchi is an Italian surname. Notable people with the surname include:

- Anna Falchi (born 1972), Italian-Finnish model and film actress
- Carlos Falchi (1944–2015), Brazilian-born handbag and accessories designer
- Isidoro Falchi (1838-1920), Italian doctor and archaeologist
