= Mauro Marrucci =

Italian painter (1937–2014)

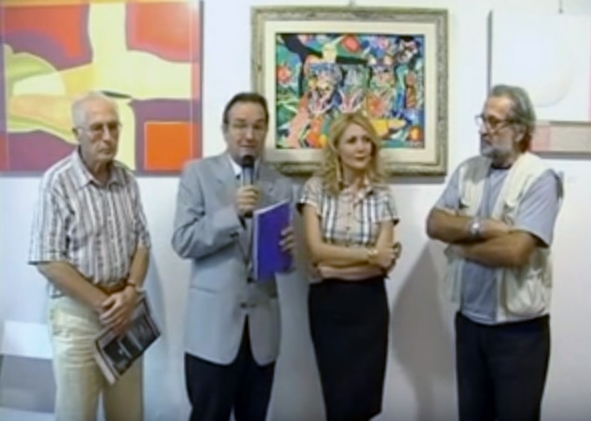
- Born: December 18, 1937; Volterra, Kingdom of Italy
- Died: November 15, 2014 (aged 76); Grosseto, Italian Republic
- Website: http://www.mauromarrucci.it/

Mauro Marrucci was an Italian artist born in Volterra, Italy on December 18, 1937, by artisans parents and he died November 15, 2014, in Grosseto.

== Biography ==
Since 1950 he worked as an Alabaster and wood craftsman. He also began his artistic research, released by academic schemes, as a graphic designer and painter and makes experiences in the field of sculpture. In 1861 he won first teaching assignment in Tuscany where he continues to practice as a graphic designer, painter and designer. Since 1973, public writings of artistic teaching and non-fiction. In December 1974 on Public Education of drawing the essay "The educational dialogue through the work of art." He also collaborates with the magazine School and cities. In 1982 he moved to Milan to teach Design and Art History at the XIII High School. In 1986 he held the chair of architecture at the Art School "Pietro Aldi" in Grosseto until retirement. From 1957 to 2011 he took part in demonstrations in graphics and painting in Italy and abroad, receiving reports from the most qualified critics and several awards.

== Awards and honors ==
- 1957 Rosignano Prize di pittura;
- 1958 exhibition di pittura e disegno a Volterra;
- 1958 exhibition "I Maestri e gli Artisti Italiani contemporanei", Galleria d'arte moderna La Permanente di Firenze;
- 1958 exhibition "Ottone Rosai e gli artisti italiani contemporanei". Galleria d'arte moderna La Permanente, Firenze.
- 1961 Collaboration in the magazine Narciso di Torino
- 1965 5° Prize Nazionale di Arti Figurative "Città di Argenta". Argenta (Ferrara)
- 1965 Personal exhibition at the Galleria d'Arte Moderna "Centro delle Arti" di Grosseto.
- 1965 Exhibition at the 4° Prize Nazionale di pittura "Città di Imperia".
- 1966 Exhibition at the 5° Premio Nazionale di pittura "Ampelio Tettamanti" dedicato alla Resistenza. Organized by Circolo Bovisa di Milano.
- 1966 6° Exhibition Pisana di Arti Figurative. Giardino Scotto, Fortezza del Sangallo. Pisa
- 1967 Personal exhibition at the Galleria d'Arte Comunale di Grosseto, on the issue of the flood of October 1966.
- 1969 Exhibition "Permanente San Francesco". Convento di San Francesco. Grosseto
- 1970 Exhibition the Artists of the Galleria D'Arte Moderna "Il Tridente" di Grosseto.
- 1971 Prize of Grafica "Il Vicolo Opera Prima" (Reserved for engravings). Organized by the Galleria d'Arte Moderna "Il Vicolo" di Genova.
- 1972 Personal exhibition at the Galleria d'Arte Moderna "L'INCONTRO - Proposte d'Arte" di Genova.
- 1972 exhibition "Maestri Italiani Contemporanei". Organized by Galleria d'Arte Moderna "L'INCONTRO - Proposte d'Arte" di Genova.
- 1972 Competition National Exhibition di Pittura Contemporanea "Premio Naz.le Pro Loco Borgosesia". Borgosesia (Vercelli). Finalist with mention
- 1972 7th National Exhibition of Graphic "Italia Bianco e Nero". Arezzo. Gold medal for engraving.
- 1972 Personal exhibition of graphic at the Galleria d'Arte Moderna "La Soffitta" di Sesto Fiorentino (FI).
- 1973 Personal exhibition of paintings and graphics at the Galleria d'Arte Moderna "Il Tridente" di Grosseto.
- 1973 Exhibition "Artisti Contemporanei" at the Galleria d'Arte Moderna "L'INCONTRO - Proposte d'Arte" di Genova.
- 1974 International exhibition "Grafica-Oggi". Galleria d'Arte Moderna di RHO (Ferrara) LA VISCONTEA.
- 1974 Exhibition "15 Artisti Italiani". Organized by Galleria d'Arte Moderna SELEARTE di Milano.
- 1974 Exhibition "49 ARTISTI" at the Biblioteca Civica di Scandicci (FI). Organized by the Galleria d'Arte Moderna "IL PONTE" di Scandicci.
- 1975 Publication of the Sage "Ipotesi di lavoro coordinato" sulla didattica artistica. Edit by Regione Letteraria di Bologna
- 1976 Exhibition of pittura itinerante "L'Immagine Critica in Toscana". Organizzata dall'ARCI-UISP di Grosseto.
- 1976 Exhibition of paintings and graphics "5 pitturi Grossetani a Cottbus"
- 1977 7° Prize Nazionale di pittura "IL MORAZZONE". Morazzone (Varese). Mentioned by the jury
- 1978 Exhibition d'Arte Grafica in Maremma. Organized by Amministrazione Comunale di Grosseto. Salone Piave, Marina di Grosseto.
- 1978 I° national Prize di pittura "Giuseppe Friuli", omaggio a Bruno Saetti. Grosseto; Sala Friuli.
- 1978 National exhibition "PITTURA ITALIANA OGGI". Biblioteca Civica ed Amministrazione Comunale di Saronno (Varese).
- 1979 9° edition del IL MORAZZONE, national exhibition di Pittura Italiana. Organized by: Associazione Pro Morazzone, Regione Lombardia, E.P.T., Comune di Varese.
- 1979 Personal exhibition at the lGalleria INQUADRATURE di Firenze.
- 1979 Collaboration in the Magazine DIDATTICA DEL DISEGNO, edit by La Scuola di Brescia.
- 1980 17° national exhibition di pittura contemporanea "SANTHIA'". (Included in the event of the State Calendar).
- 1981 Exhibition di pittura itinerante "Museo mobile: NUOVI VERSANTI DELLA PITTURA IN TOSCANA". Organized dal Comune di Grosseto e dalla Ammin.ne Prov.le di Grosseto.
- 1982 18° National exhibition of Pittura Contemporanea "SANTHIA'". Santhià (Vercelli). Premiato.
- 1987 1° exhibition d'Arte Figurativa "OPERA GIUSEPPE FRIULI". Chiostro di S. Francesco. Grosseto.
- 1996 International exhibition "CONFRONTI" del ciclo "IL SOGNO DEL CAVALLO". Cassero Senese, Grosseto. Organized dal Comune di Grosseto.
- 1996 Exhibition d'Arte Figurativa "Carlo Gentili". Cassero Senese, Grosseto.
- 1996 Exhibition "ETRURIA ARTE". Venturina (Livorno).
- 1998 Personal exhibition at the Galleria dell'A.G.A.F. di Grosseto, sul tema: "dei divani o della condizione umana".
- 1998 13° Prize Italia. Organized by the Rivista d'Arte Moderna ECO D'Arte
- 1998 Exhibition by Galleria Moderna di Firenze. Certaldo e Firenze.
- 1999 Personal exhibition at the Galleria dell'AGAF di Grosseto, sul tema: "la visione dell'astrazione dentro il sentimento della realtà".
- 2000 Exhibition "ARTE PER LA VITA"- Pittori Toscani Contemporanei. Organized dall'AITF Toscana. Curata da N. Micieli. Pisa.
- 2001 Exhibition d'Arte Visuale "9 ARTISTI TOSCANI A NAPOLI 9". Chiostro e Sale del Complesso Monumentale di S. Maria La Nova. Napoli.
- 2001 Exhibition d'Arte Visuale "Forme, Segni, Colori", Palazzo l'Approdo di Castiglione della Pescaia (GR). Organized dall'Associazione Culturale EVENTI di Grosseto.
- 2001 Exhibition d'Arte Visuale "Forme, Segni, Colori". Biblioteca Civica di Orbetello (GR). Organized dall'Associazione Culturale EVENTI di Grosseto.
- 2002 Exhibition d'Arte Visuale "Eventi d'Arte". Museo Minerario di Abbadia S. Salvatore (SI). Organized dall'Associazione Culturale EVENTI di Grosseto.
- 2003 Exhibition d'Arte Visuale "terrEventi". Palazzo Patrizi di Siena - Galleria Comunale. Organized by dall'Associazione culturale EVENTI di Grosseto e sponsorizzata dall'Università e dal Comune di Siena.
- 2003 40° National exhibition di Pittura Contemporanea "SANTHIA'". Santhià (Vercelli). Compresa nel Calendario delle manifestazioni ufficiali dello Stato. Organized dalla Pro Loco di Santhià.
- 2003 9° National exhibition d'Arte "ideArte", Pisa.
- 2004 1° International exhibition "Movimento Artistico Esasperatismo" Logos & Bidone, Casina Pompeiana - Napoli, Villa Comunale.
- 2005 Exhibition Civica Pinacoteca di Follonica (Gr).
- 2005 Group exhibition with il gruppo "Eventi" at civica pinacoteca di Follonica and museo archeologico e d'arte della Maremma di Grosseto.
- 2006 National exhibition Movimento Esasperatista, Museo Archeologico e d'Arte della Maremma Grosseto.
- 2006 Personal exhibition, "Enucleando", galleria "Il Bidone" di Napoli.
- 2007 Second International exhibition Esasperatismo - Logo & Bidone, Castel dell'Ovo, Napoli.
- 2008 International prize La Pergola Arte, Piccolo Formato, 2^ Edizione – Firenze.
- 2008 Exhibition Contemporanea-Mente - Collezione d'Arte Moderna e Contemporanea - Fondazione "Il Sole", Grosseto.
- 2009 Tribute to Alberto Magnelli organized by La Pergola Arte, Auditorium Cassa di Risparmio di Firenze.
- 2009 Personal Exhibition at the Galleria La Pergola Arte "Emergenze espressive" di Firenze.
- 2009 Arte contemporanea Italiana, 3° Edition - Galleria La Pergola Arte, Firenze.
- 2009 Exhibition d'Arte Contemporanea - La Pergola Arte a Palazzo Medici Riccardi - Firenze
- 2009 Exhibition d'Arte Contemporanea - Movimento Internazionale Esasperatismo. Logos & Bidone - Museo "Tiberio Gracco", Pompei (NA).
- 2011 Exhibition d'Arte Visuale sulla Resistenza Centro per l'Arte Contemporanea di Carmignano, curated by the art historian and Florentine critic Marco Fagioli.

== Awards and honors ==
- 1958 Prize "Ponte Vecchio" di pittura, Firenze. Signaling from the jury.
- 1961 First Prize at premio alla 4° Mostra Concorso Nazionale Modelli per l'Alabastro. Volterra.
- 1963 2nd National Painting Prize "Città di Imperia".
- 1963 National Graphic Award "Venturina" (LI). It is awarded the gold medal.
