= Campiglia Marittima railway station =

Railway station in Italy

Campiglia Marittima
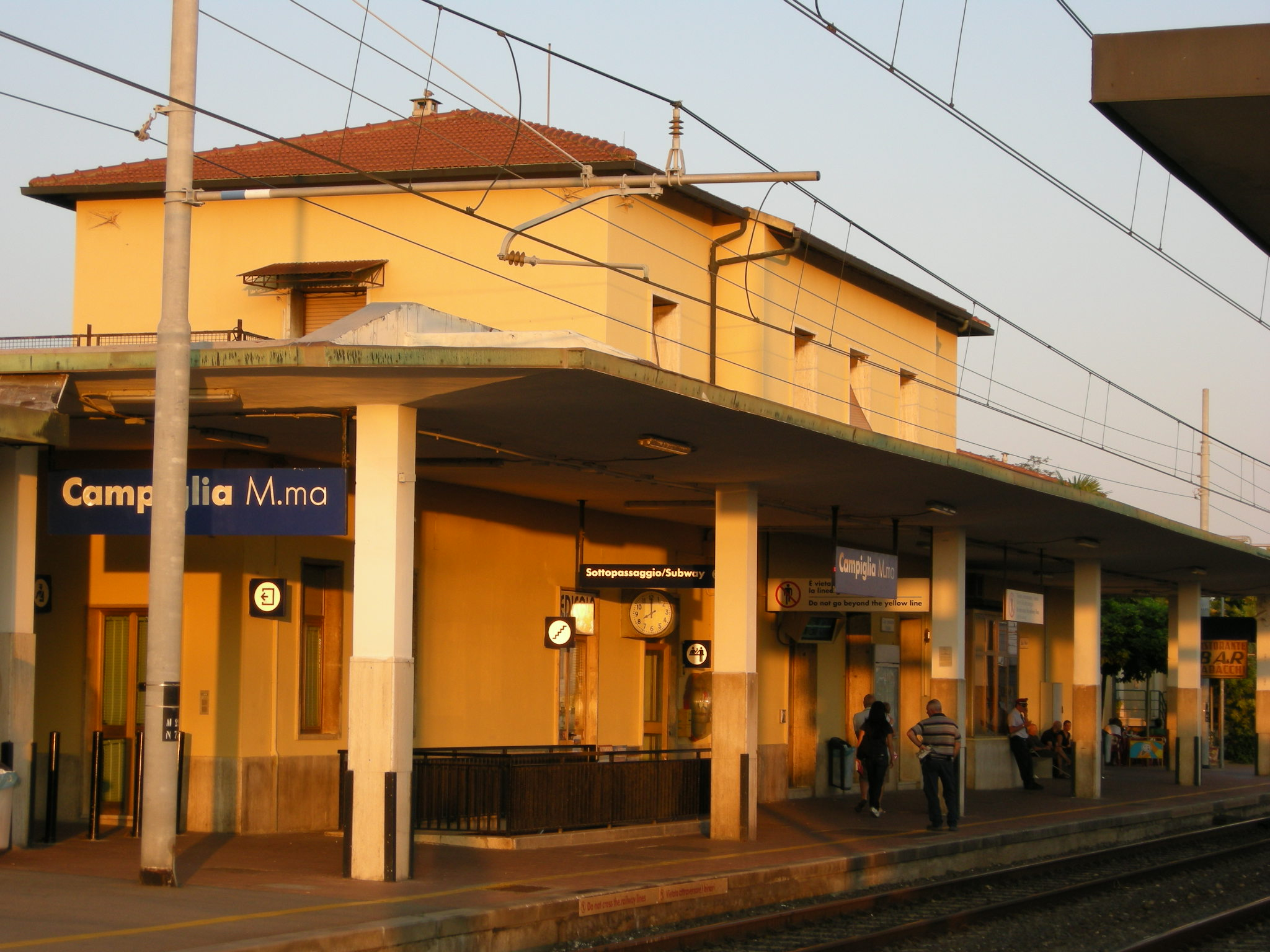
- View of the station building from platform 2.

General information
- Location: Via della Stazione; Venturina Terme; Livorno 57021; Campiglia Marittima, Livorno, Tuscany; Italy
- Coordinates: 43°01′02″N 10°35′12″E
- Operator: Rete Ferroviaria Italiana; Trenitalia
- Lines: Tirrenica; Campiglia Marittima–Piombino
- Distance: 246.752 km (153.325 mi) from Roma Termini
- Tracks: 8

Other information
- Classification: Silver

History
- Opened: 20 October 1863; 162 years ago
Location
- Location within Tuscany Location within Italy

Campiglia Marittima railway station is an Italian railway station on the Tirrenica railway line. It serves as a junction for the line to Piombino that connects here with the Tirrenica railway.

== History ==
The station opened on 20 October 1863 along with the section of the Tirrenica railway from Livorno to Follonica. On 5 April 1892, the line from here to Piombino was opened. Both these lines have been consistently in operation since then. In 2017, the station was the subject of a heavy refurbishment that raised the height of the platforms and replaced the canopies on all platforms, costing the state 5 million euros.

=== Lampo, the traveller dog ===
Lampo was a stray dog that came off a cargo train at Campiglia Marittima in August 1953, and was adopted, despite railway regulations, by the then stationmaster Elvio Barlettani. The dog allegedly learnt the train schedules, so was able to go somewhere and return each day. After a few years, the regional management of the railway ordered the stationmaster to remove the dog. Lampo was put on a cargo train to Naples, but amazingly managed to return. He then went to Barletta, but again returned to Campiglia, where his fame grew. The stationmaster wrote a book entitled Lampo, il cane viaggatore following the dog's death. A statue of Lampo remains on platform 1 of Campiglia station.

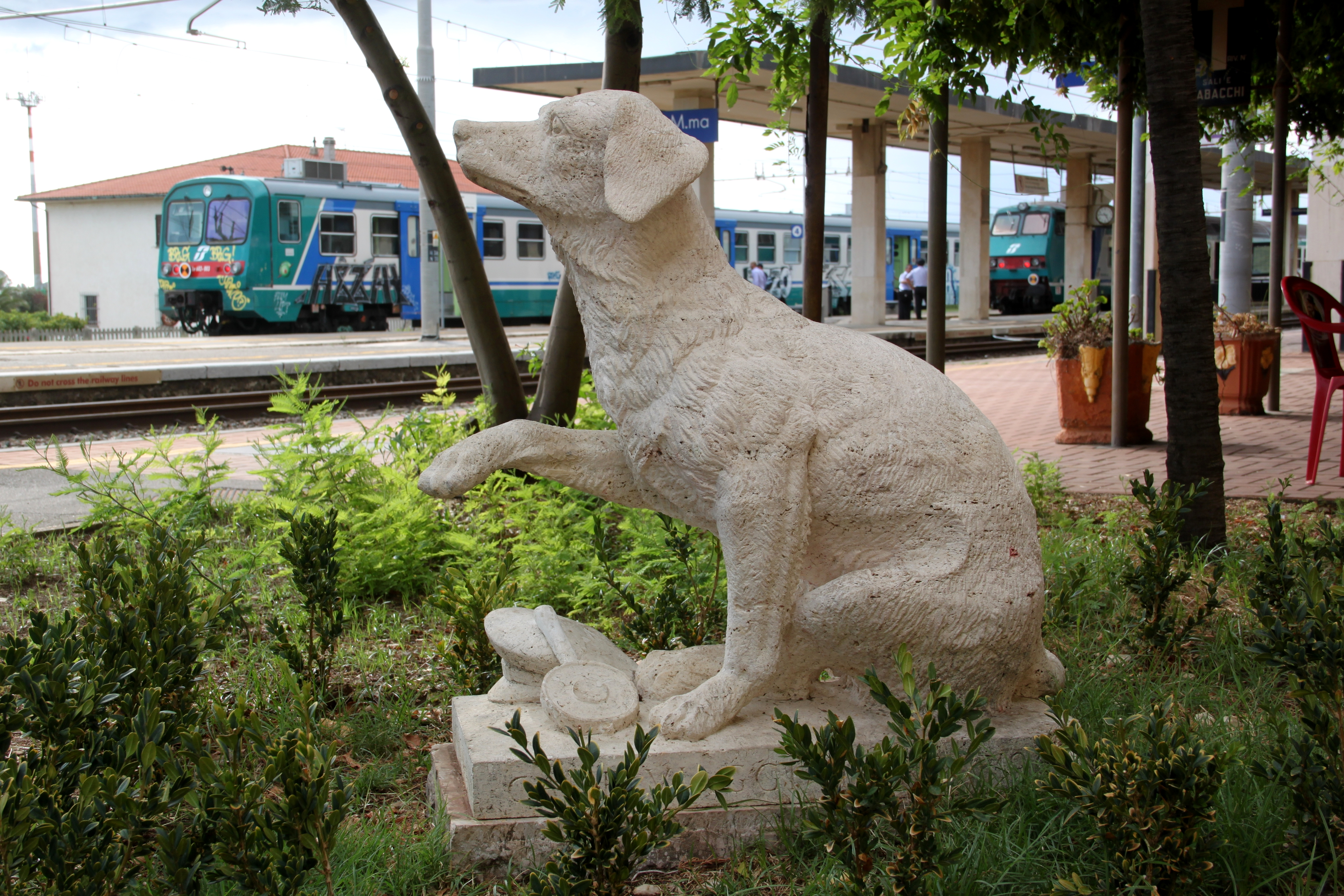
The statue of Lampo

== Train services and movements ==
Regular passenger services to the station consist of regionale, regionale veloce, InterCity and Frecciabianca services, which run frequently to Grosseto, Pisa Centrale, Roma Termini, Piombino, Florence SMN, Milano Centrale, Genoa, Torino Porta Nuova and Napoli Centrale.

== Gallery ==
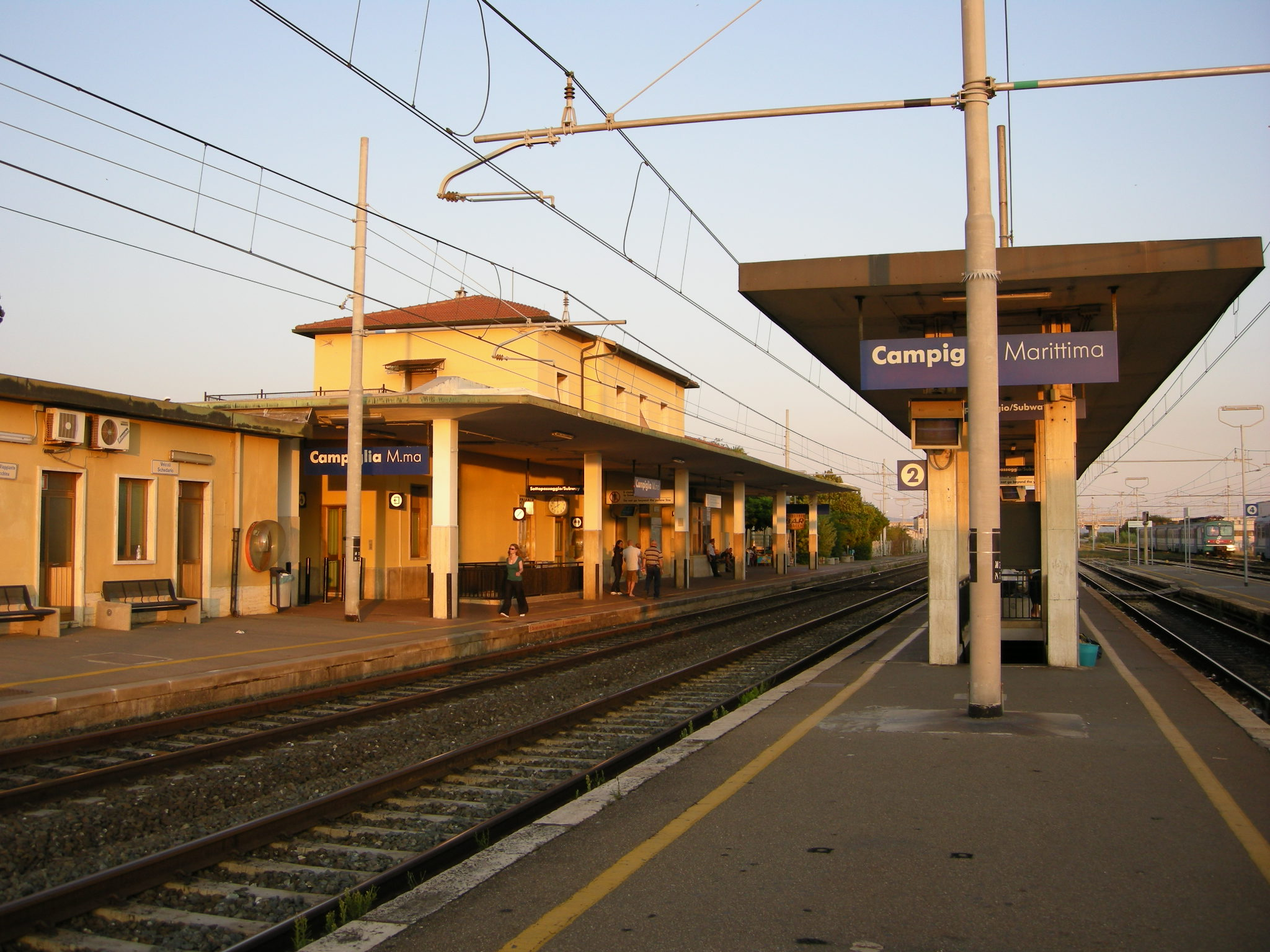
The station prior to its 2017 refurbishment.

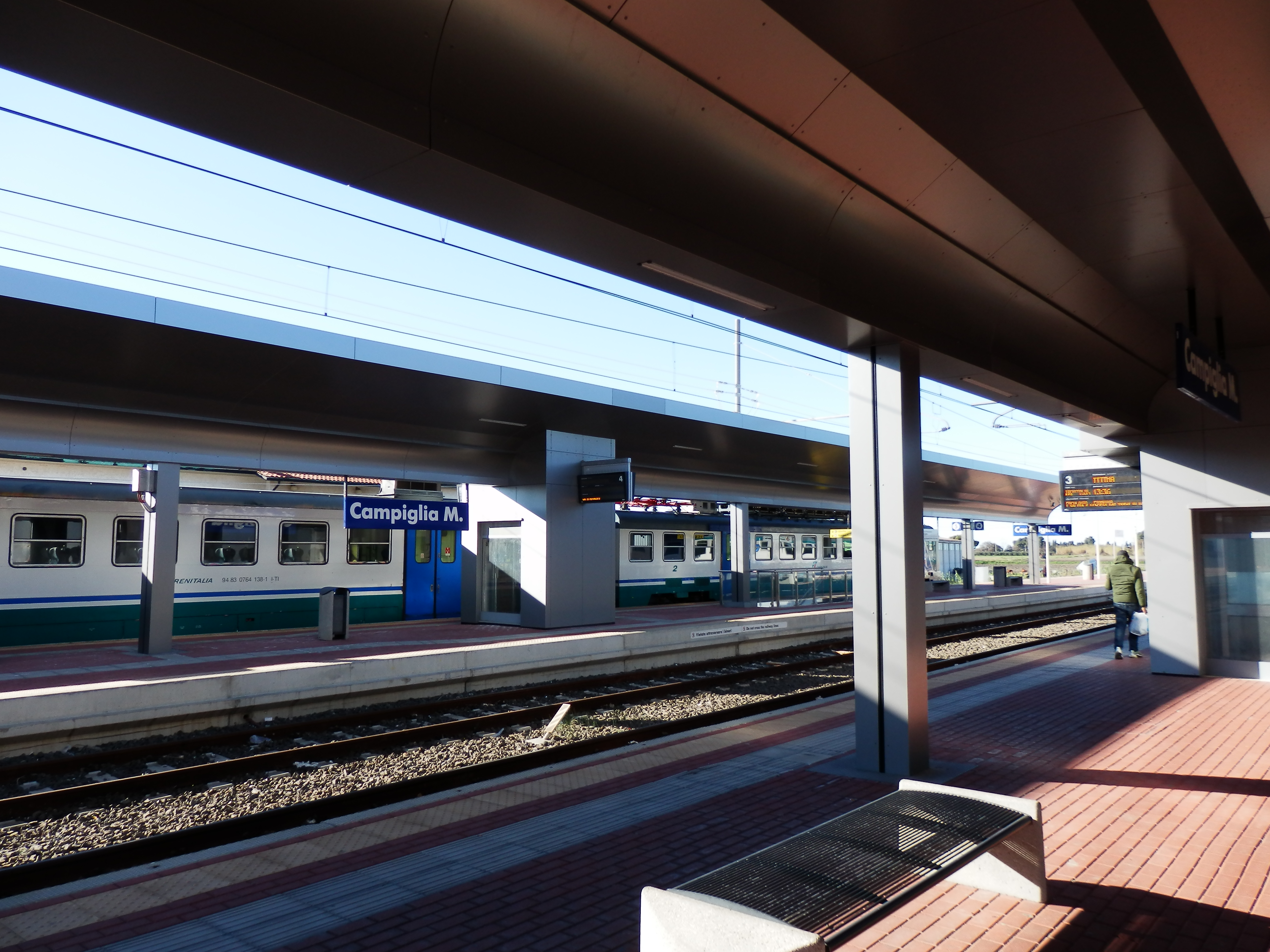
The station after its refurbishment.

== See also ==
- History of rail transport in Italy
- List of railway stations in Tuscany
- Rail transport in Italy
- Railway stations in Italy
- Campiglia Marittima-Piombino railway
- Tirrenica railway
