= Campiglia Marittima-Piombino railway =

Railway line in Italy

Campiglia Marittima-Piombino railway line
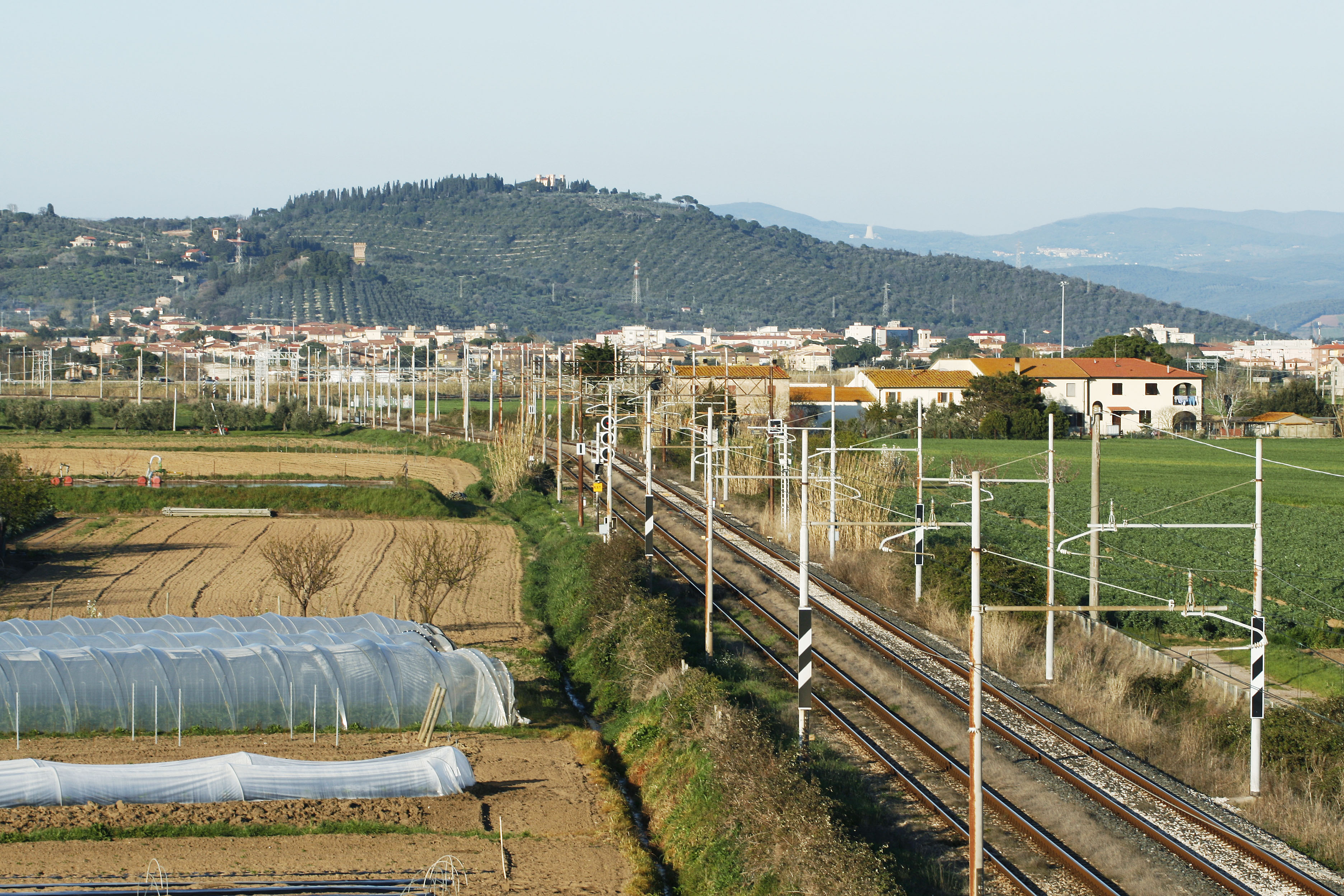
- The line near Campiglia Marittima

Overview
- Status: in use
- Owner: Rete Ferroviaria Italiana
- Locale: Tuscany, Italy
- Termini: Campiglia Marittima; Piombino Marittima

Service
- Type: Heavy rail

History
- Opened: 1892

Technical
- Number of tracks: 2
- Track gauge: 1,435 mm (4 ft 8 1/2 in) standard gauge
- Electrification: yes

The Campiglia Marittima-Piombino railway line, also known as the Cornia Valley Railway, is an Italian railway line that connects the junction at Campiglia Marittima with the port town of Piombino.

== Traffic ==
The line is served by regionale and regionale veloce trains operated by Trenitalia, of which most continue from Campiglia Marittima to Pisa Centrale and Florence SMN.

== Gallery ==
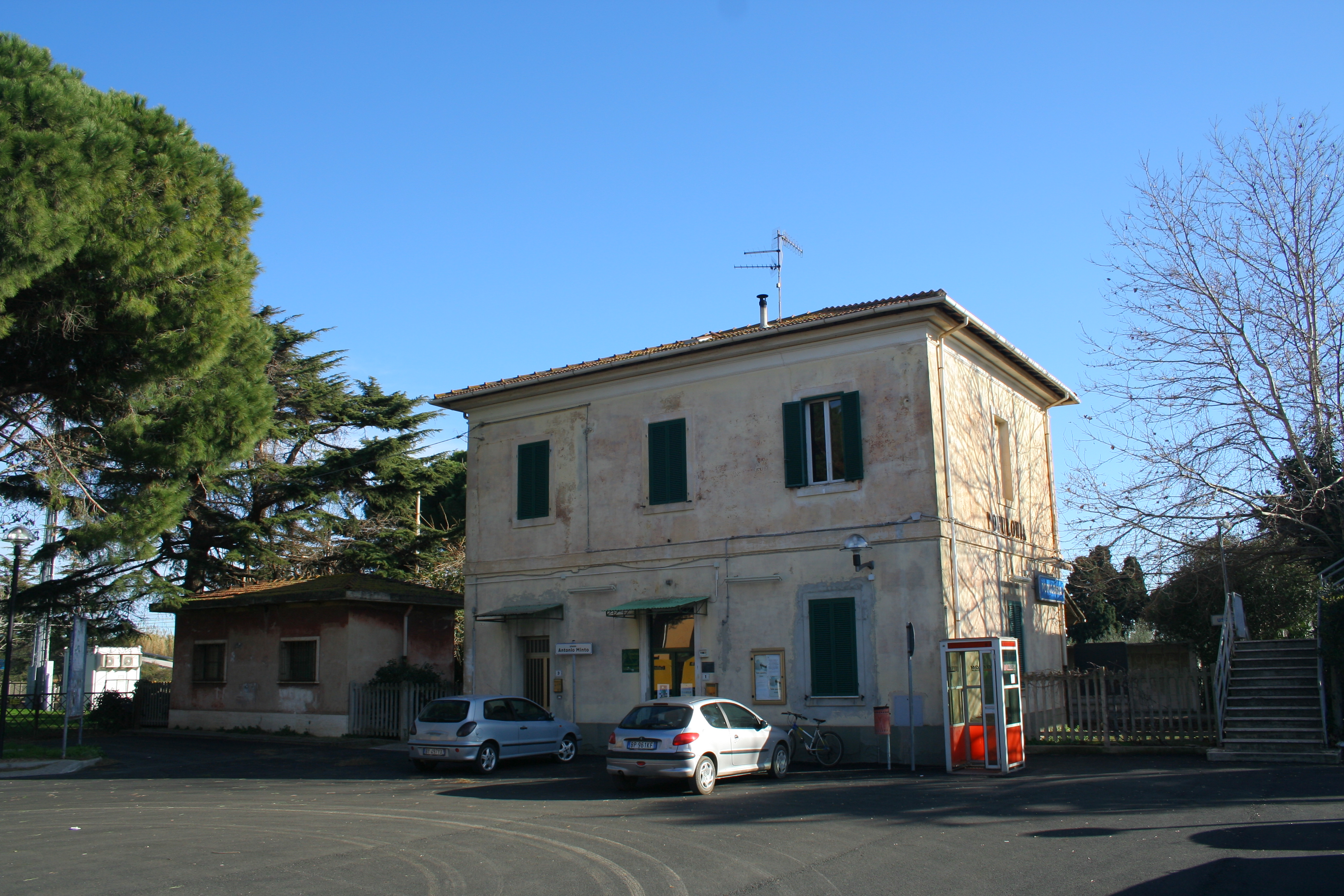
View of Populonia railway station from outside

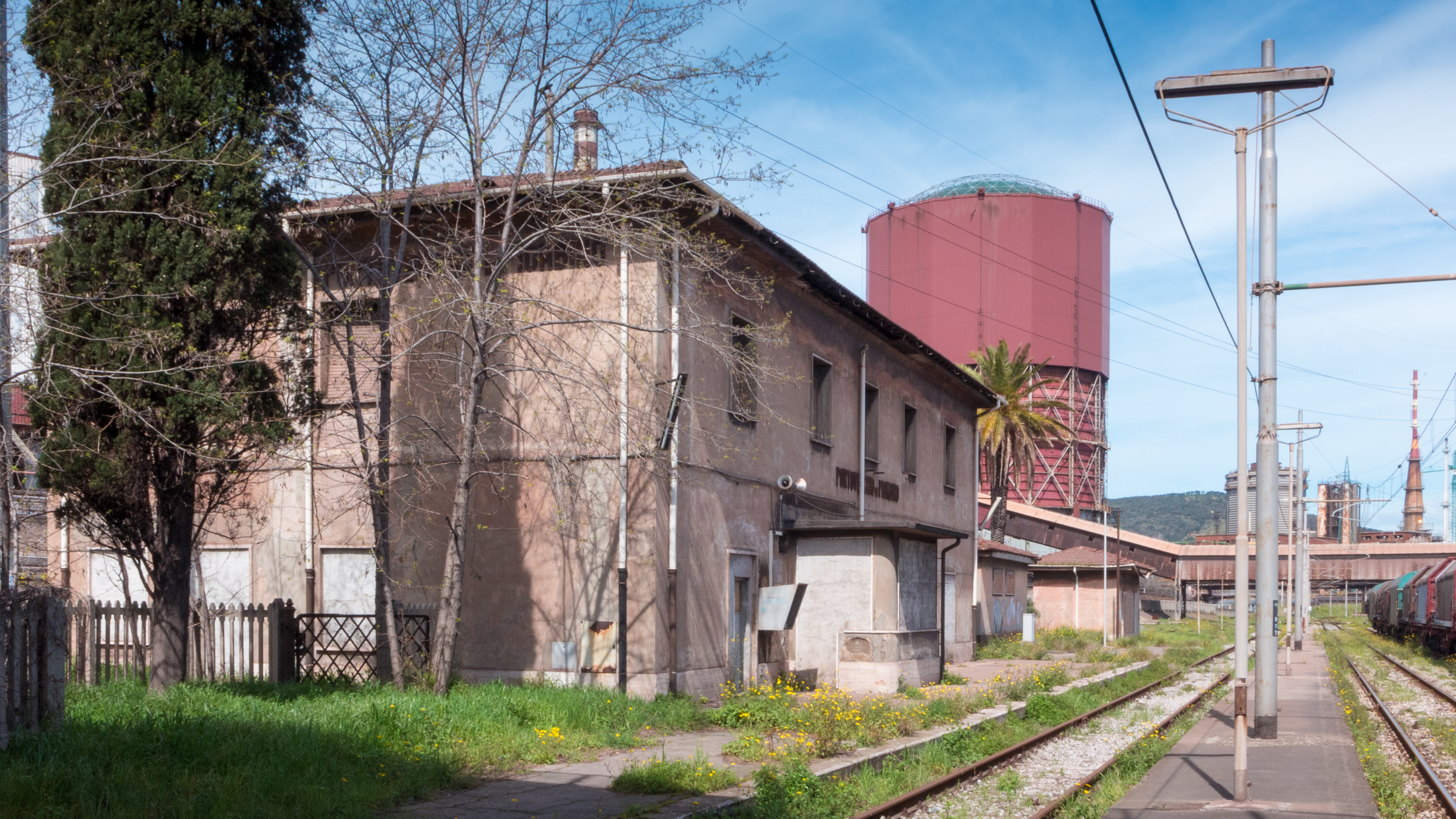
Portovecchio di Piombino closed station, only open for freight.

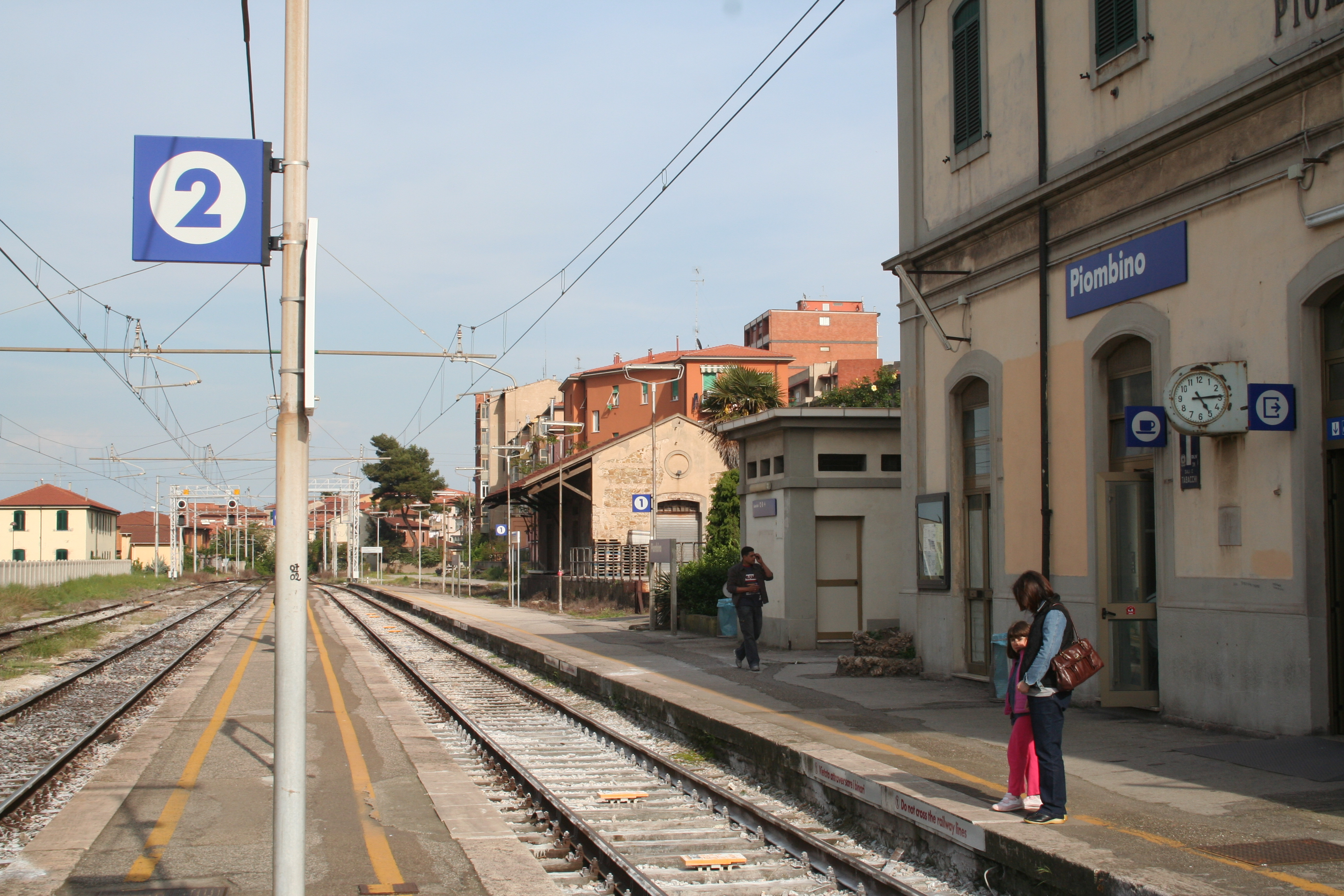
Piombino station (not to be confused with Marittima station)

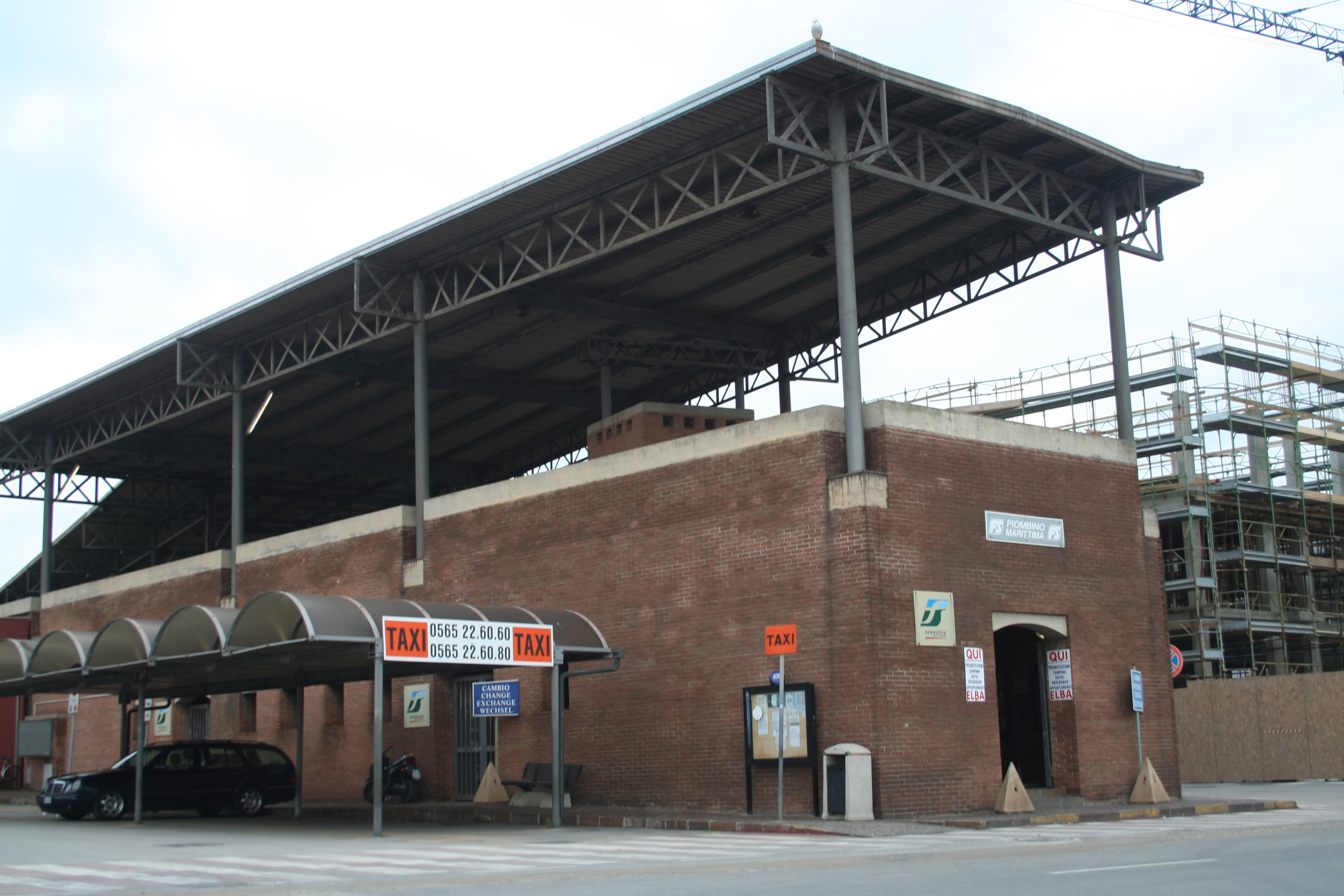
Piombino Marittima station, located at the port

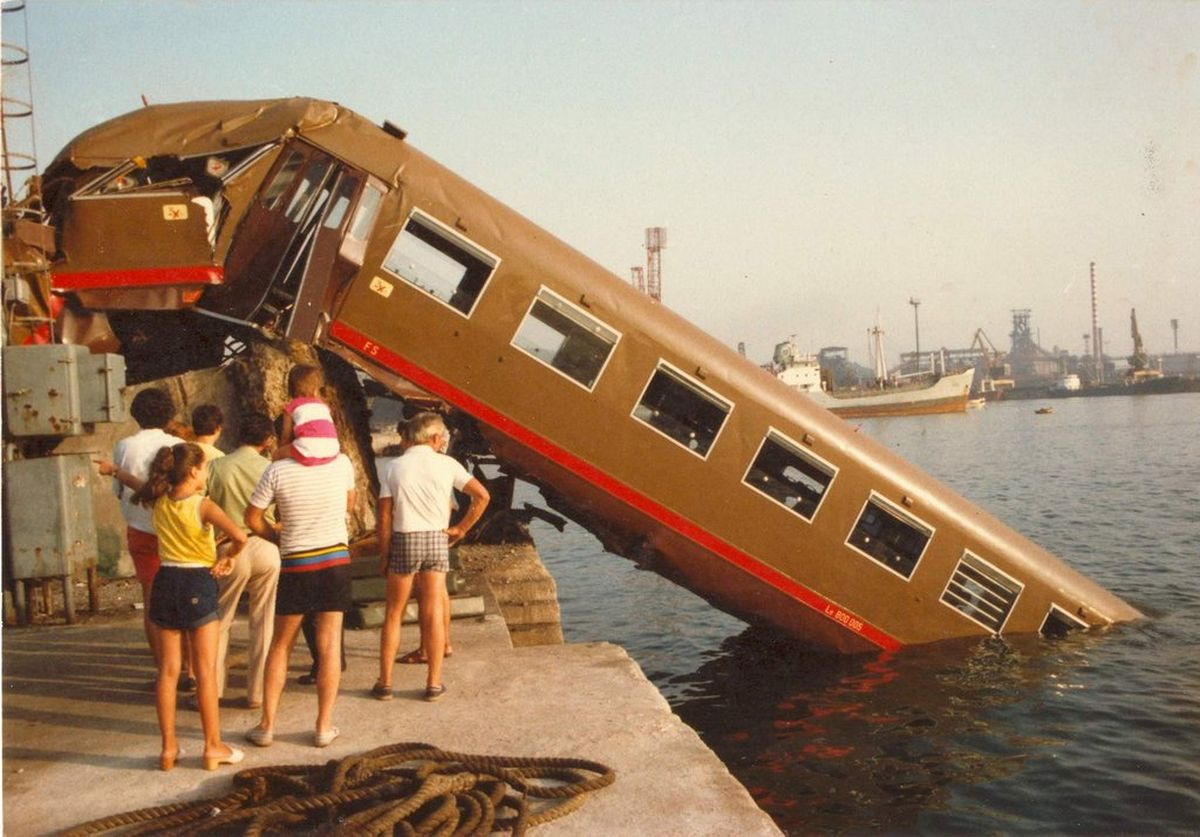
An incident in 1983 caused a train to crash into the sea.

== See also ==
- Campiglia Marittima railway station
- Tirrenica railway
