= Campiglia Marittima =

- Comune
- Comune di Campiglia Marittima
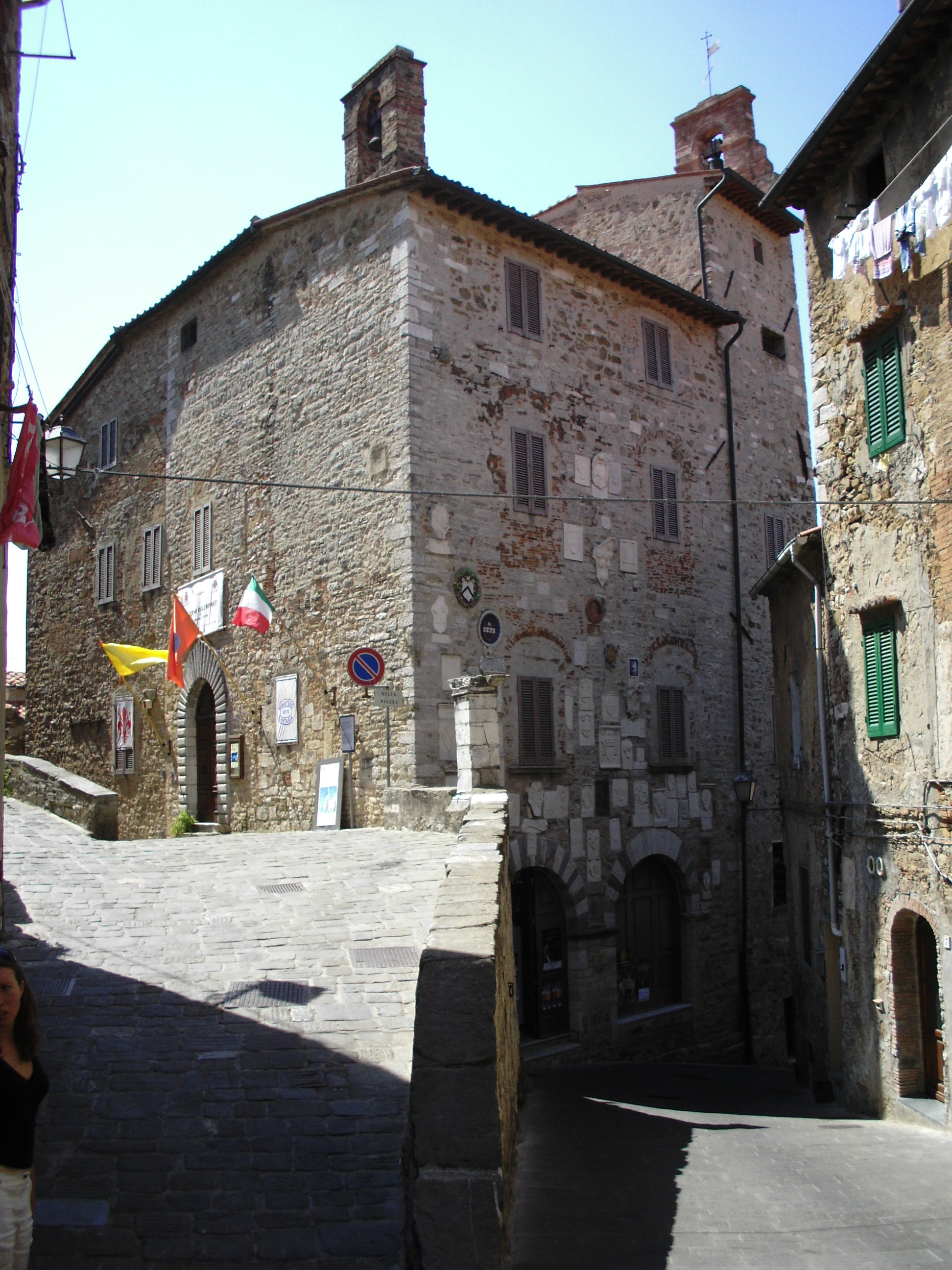
- Palazzo Pretorio.

- Coat of arms

- Location within Italy Location within Tuscany
- Coordinates: 43°4′N 10°37′E
- Country: Italy
- Region: Tuscany
- Province: Livorno (LI)
- Frazioni: Cafaggio, Venturina Terme

Government
  - Mayor: Alberta Ticciati

Area
  - Total: 83.2 km^{2} (32.1 sq mi)
- Elevation: 231 m (758 ft)

Population (January 2017)
  - Total: 13,167
  - Density: 158/km^{2} (410/sq mi)
- Demonym: Campigliesi
- Time zone: UTC+1 (CET)
  - Summer (DST): UTC+2 (CEST)
- Postal code: 57021
- Dialing code: 0565
- Website: Official website

Campiglia Marittima is a comune (municipality) in the Province of Livorno in the Italian region of Tuscany, located about 90 kilometres (56 mi) southwest of Florence and about 60 kilometres (37 mi) southeast of Livorno. It is one of I Borghi più belli d'Italia ("The most beautiful villages of Italy").

Its toponym has been attested for the first time in 1004 as Campiglia and derives from the Latin campus ("field"). In 1862 the word marittima (from Latin Maritima) was added to underline its belonging to the Maremma, the area washed by Tyrrhenian Sea.

== Overview ==
Situated on a hill overlooking the sea and the surrounding countryside, the town has medieval origins, but traces of Etruscan and Roman civilizations can be found as well. Its past is linked to metal-working activities as it's witnessed by the Val Fucinaia furnaces and the remains of mining and metallurgical works in the Archaeological-Mineral Park of San Silvestro.

== Geography ==
Campiglia Marittima is situated in the Upper Maremma region, near the river Cornia, an intermittent watercourse which gives its name to the area Campiglia belongs to, the so-called Val di Cornia. The bounding municipalities are Piombino, San Vincenzo and Suvereto.

The comune includes the frazioni of Cafaggio and Venturina Terme, and the small hamlets of Banditelle and Lumiere.

== Culture ==
The town hosts Apritiborgo Festival, a street art festival that has been held annually since 2005, usually in mid-August.

== Main sights ==
=== Palazzo Pretorio ===
The building, ancient seat of political and military power, is an important evidence of Campiglia's late medieval period and shows the influence of two dominant Tuscan cities, Florence and Pisa. The original facade is made of two white-grey limestone arches in which an inscription indicates that the building was erected in 1246. The upper part of the facade is enriched with 72 heraldic emblems that date from 1406, year in which Campiglia passed under the rule of Florentine Republic. The building was originally smaller and it was enlarged several times down the centuries. Palazzo Pretorio houses the Municipal Historical Archive, a mineralogical museum, a children's library and the permanent exhibition of Carlo Guarnieri's paintings and engravings.

=== Rocca ===
The medieval complex of the Rocca rises on the peak of the hill where Campiglia lies. The building has an irregular polygonal plan and is made up of different parts. The oldest remains are the central tower, the cistern and scattered traces of stonework. In 1932, the construction of the municipal aqueduct brought considerable damages to the complex, such as the alteration of the ancient plan. In 1990 the Rocca was acquired by the Municipality of Campiglia. From 1994 the Department of Medieval Archeology of the University of Siena started an archaeological dig whose results are currently shown in the museum (Museo della Rocca) opened in 2008. It was detected the presence of a farmer's wooden-hut village since the 10th century, while the traces of the first stone buildings dates back to the 12th century as residential area for the powerful Della Gherardesca family, ruler of Campiglia at the time. At the end of the 13th century, since the local political scenario had been changed, a Pisan garrison settled in the castle, as witnessed by pieces of weapons and armours dug up in the area.

=== Archaeological-Mineral Park of San Silvestro ===
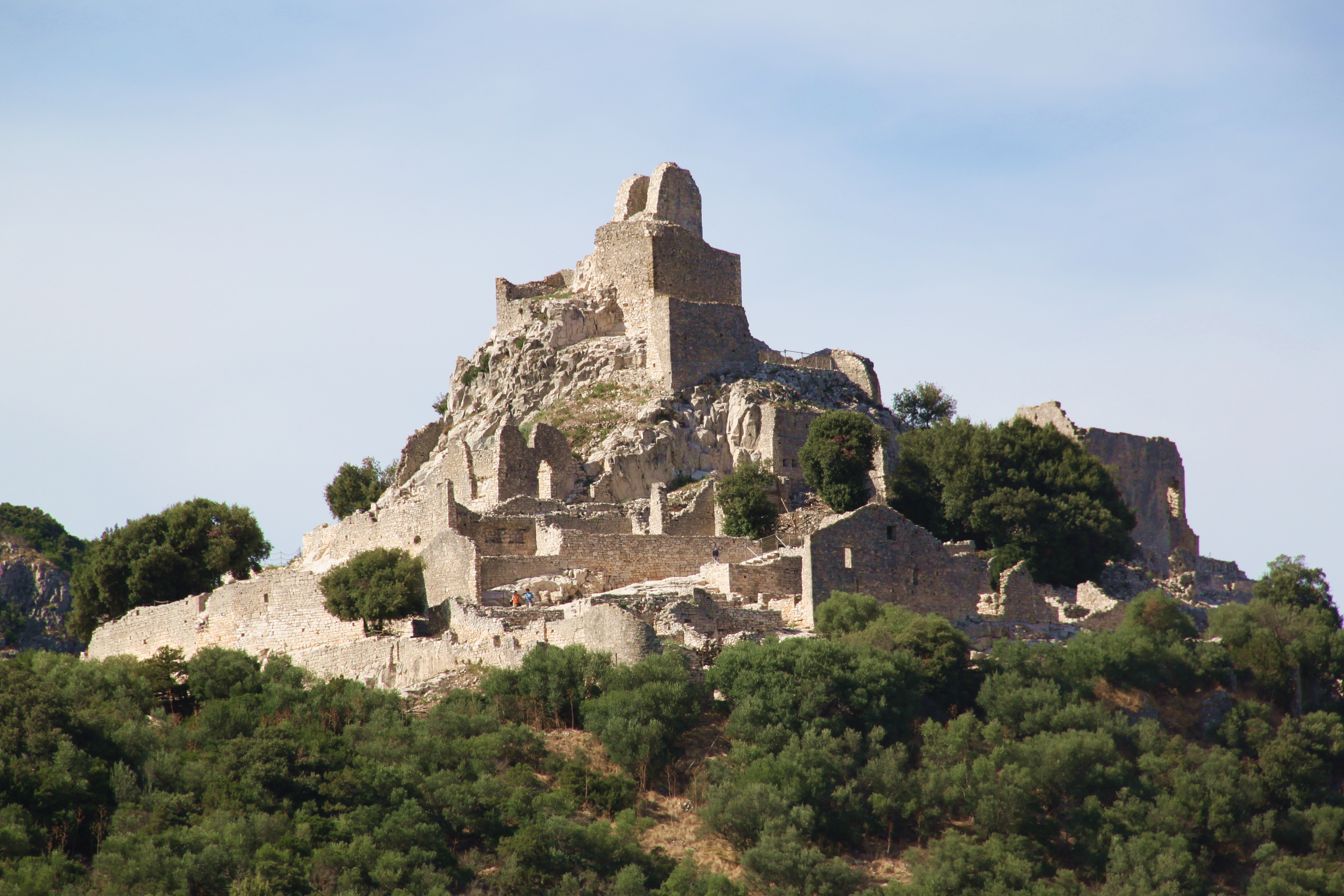
Rocca of San Silvestro

The park covers 450 hectares in the north of Campiglia Marittima and it shows history of mining and metallurgical cycle from the Etruscan era to the present day. The remains of Rocca San Silvestro, a fortified borough built by the della Gherardesca family in the 10th-11th centuries, represent the heart of the park. Lanzi-Temperino Tunnel, where visitors on board a train can discover the journey of the minerals, and Temperino Mine, where evolution of the techniques used to extract minerals is retraced, are as well noteworthy.

=== Teatro dei Concordi ===
The theatre was built in the half of 19th century. The project was funded by the Accademia dei Concordi, an association of Campiglia's wealthy citizens, and it was inaugurated on 26 December 1867. Its interiors are decorated by painter Michele Albioni and organized in three tiers of palchi (private boxes). It was acquired by the Municipality in 1990.

=== Museum of sacred art ===
Opened on 11 July 2003, it displays a collection of items for liturgical and devotional use which represent the historical and artistic heritage of the parish church of San Lorenzo. It is housed in the underlying room beneath the Church, the so-called Sala delle Volte (“vaulted room”), that is what is left of a medieval building.

=== Churches ===
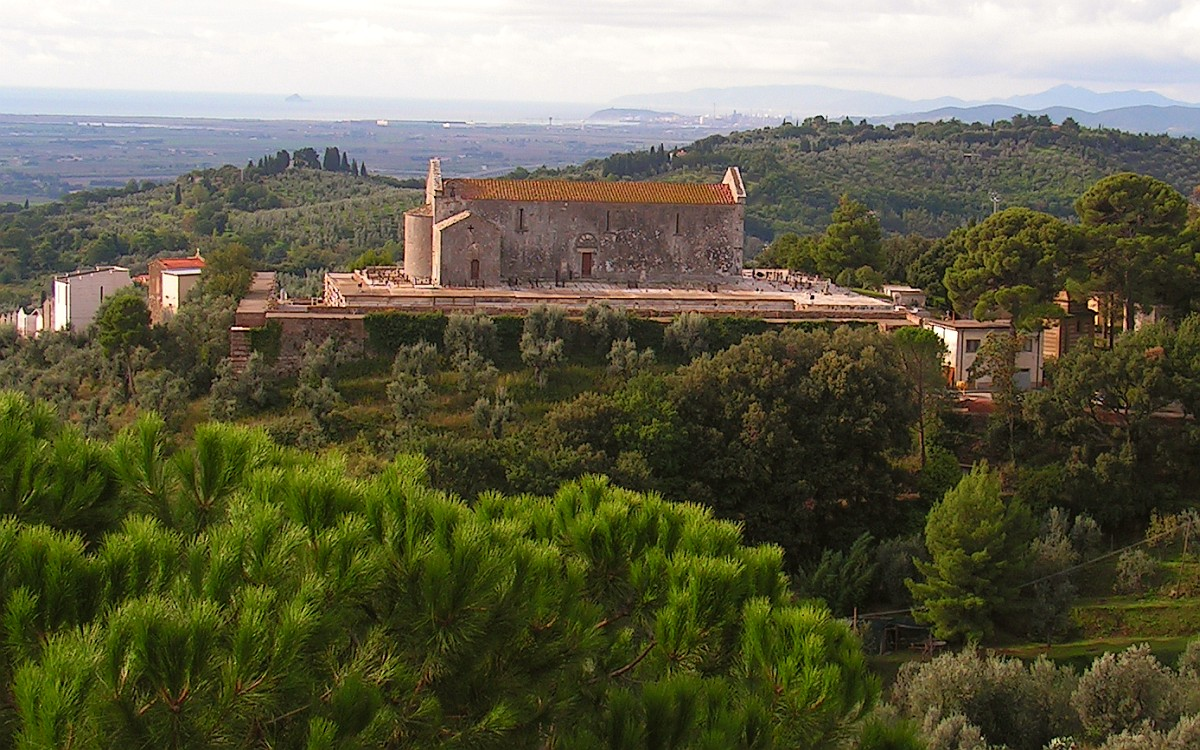
Pieve of San Giovanni and its surrounding cemetery

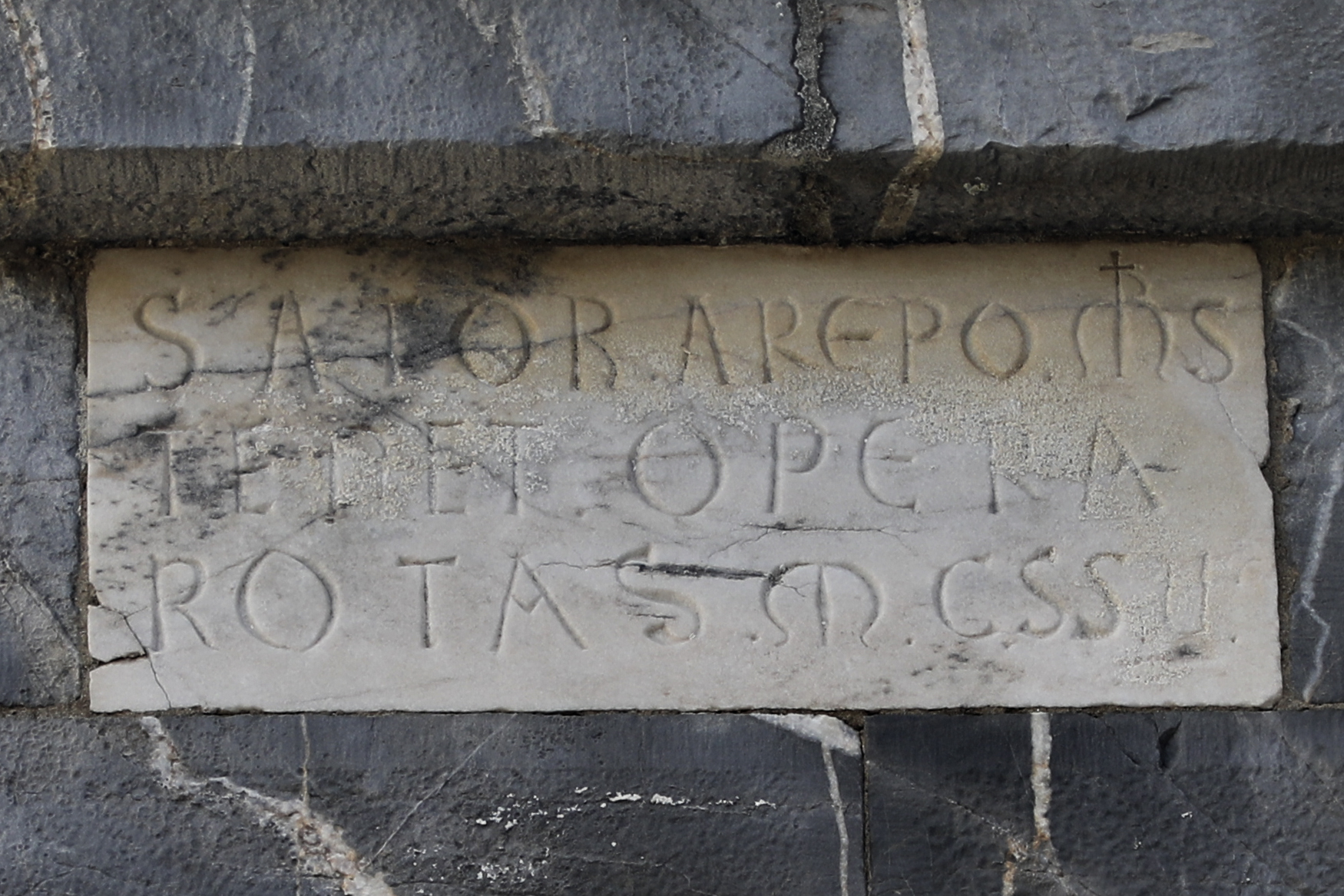
Sator Square, Pieve di San Giovanni

- Pieve of San Giovanni: the Pisane Romanesque style church of San Giovanni is characterised by simple architectural lines with a plan in the form of a tau cross and a small apse at the end of the central aisle. According to a memorial inscription placed on the sides of the main door, the church was built in 1173. In the external side of the left transept, just below the edge of the roof, a palindrome magical formula is inscribed in a stone plaque. This Latin sentence, which reads "SATOR AREPO TENET OPERA ROTAS", is an example of Sator Square and it lays out on three lines that may be read left-to-right or right-to-left. The architrave of the left-side portal features a stone carving that represents a wild boar hunting scene referring to Etruscan and Roman tradition.
- Parish church of San Lorenzo: it was first mentioned in 1325. Originally it had only a single aisle but later the transept and the 17th century Chapel of Mercy were added. Its interiors are embellished with 16th - 17th-century paintings, especially “Our Lady of Graces” attributed to Master of San Torpè.
- Church of Sant'Antonio: according to the historian Isidoro Falchi, the church was first mentioned in a 16th-century historical reference and it was presumably built in this period. The church, made of sandstone and limestone, has a single aisle and a gabled facade. A few steps from the main entrance a new tabernacle depicting Saint Anthony the Abbot was unveiled on 5 July 2015. It was realised by students from Florence Academy of Fine Arts.
- Sanctuary of Madonna di Fucinaia: it lies along the road from Campiglia to San Vincenzo. The year of construction is uncertain. Its first historical reference dates back to 1493 (other sources indicate the early 16th century) referring to the annexation of a monastery assigned to Augustinian friars. The Sanctuary takes its name from a painting of the Virgin which, according to tradition, was found in a forge (“fucina”) near this site. A copy is displayed above the altar while the original painting is preserved in the parish church of San Lorenzo.

=== Lampo statue ===
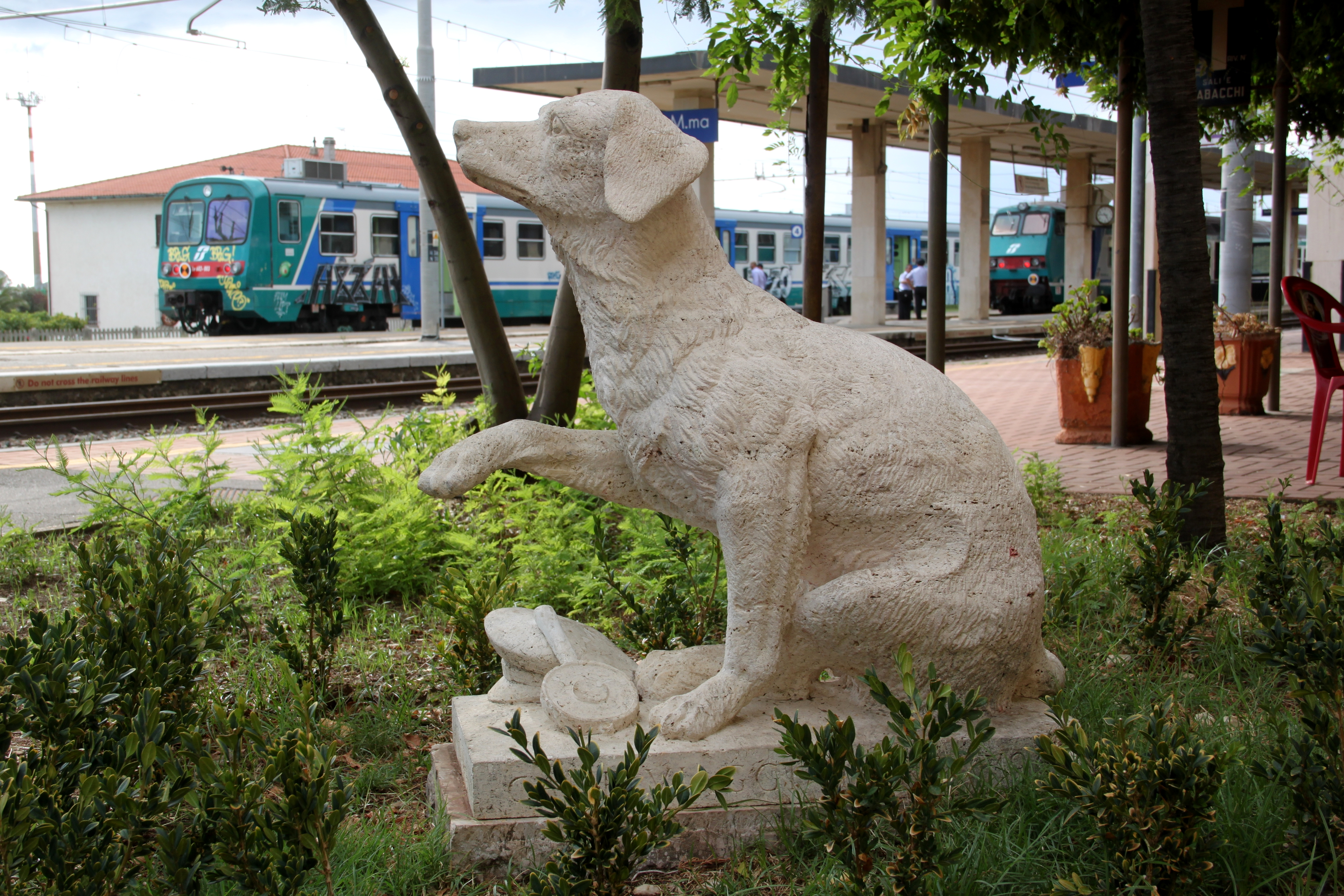
Monument of Lampo at the Campiglia Marittima railway station.

There is a statue of the dog called Lampo (Lightning in Italian) at the Campiglia Marittima railway station in Venturina Terme. It commemorates the dog that was famous in Italy during 1950s for travelling by train. On the evening of 22 July 1961 in Campiglia Marittima, a maneuvering cargo train hit the dog, who was then buried in the flowerbed at the foot of an acacia tree at the railway station.

== Notable people ==
- Lucio Colletti, politician and philosopher
- Isidoro Falchi, doctor and archaeologist
- Renato Fucini, poet
- Riccardo Fogli, singer
- Luciano Luci, football referee

== Gallery ==
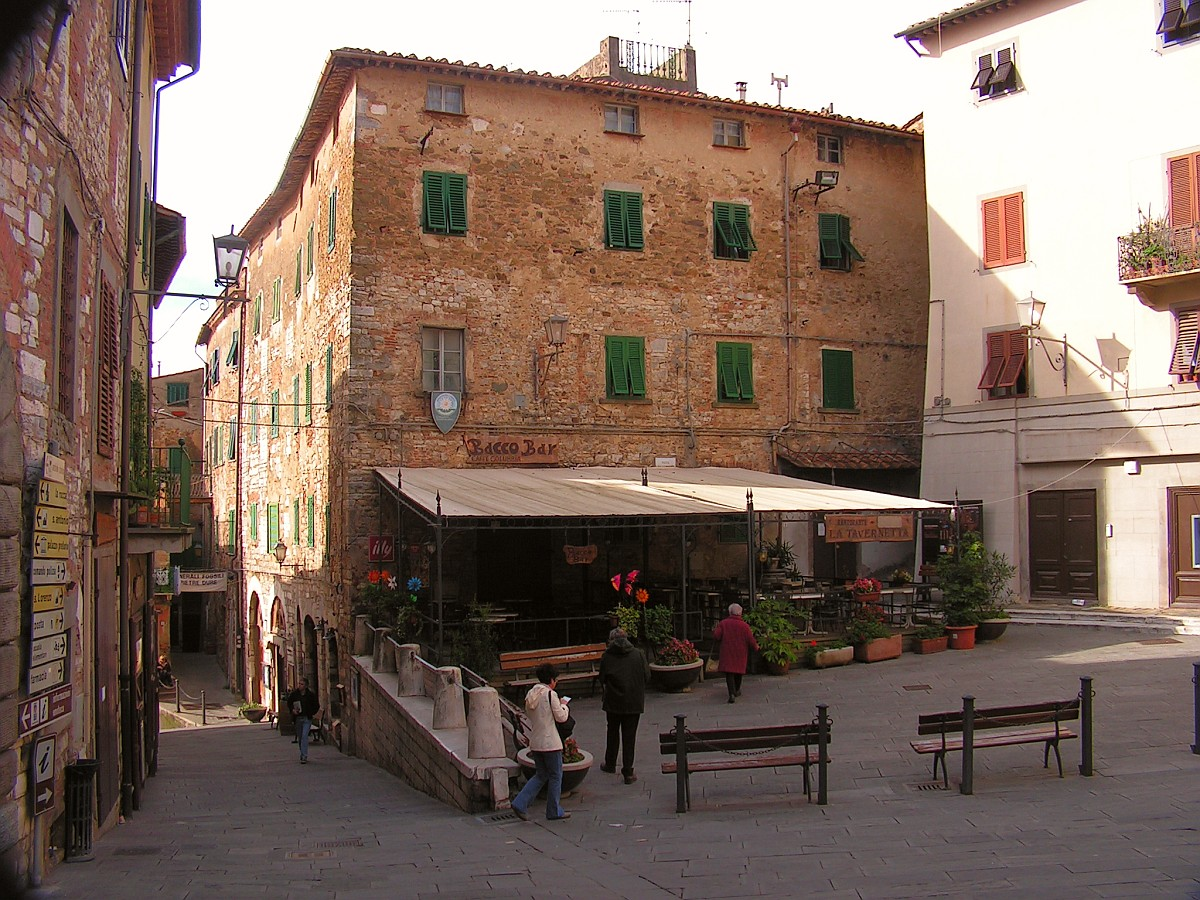
Piazza della Repubblica

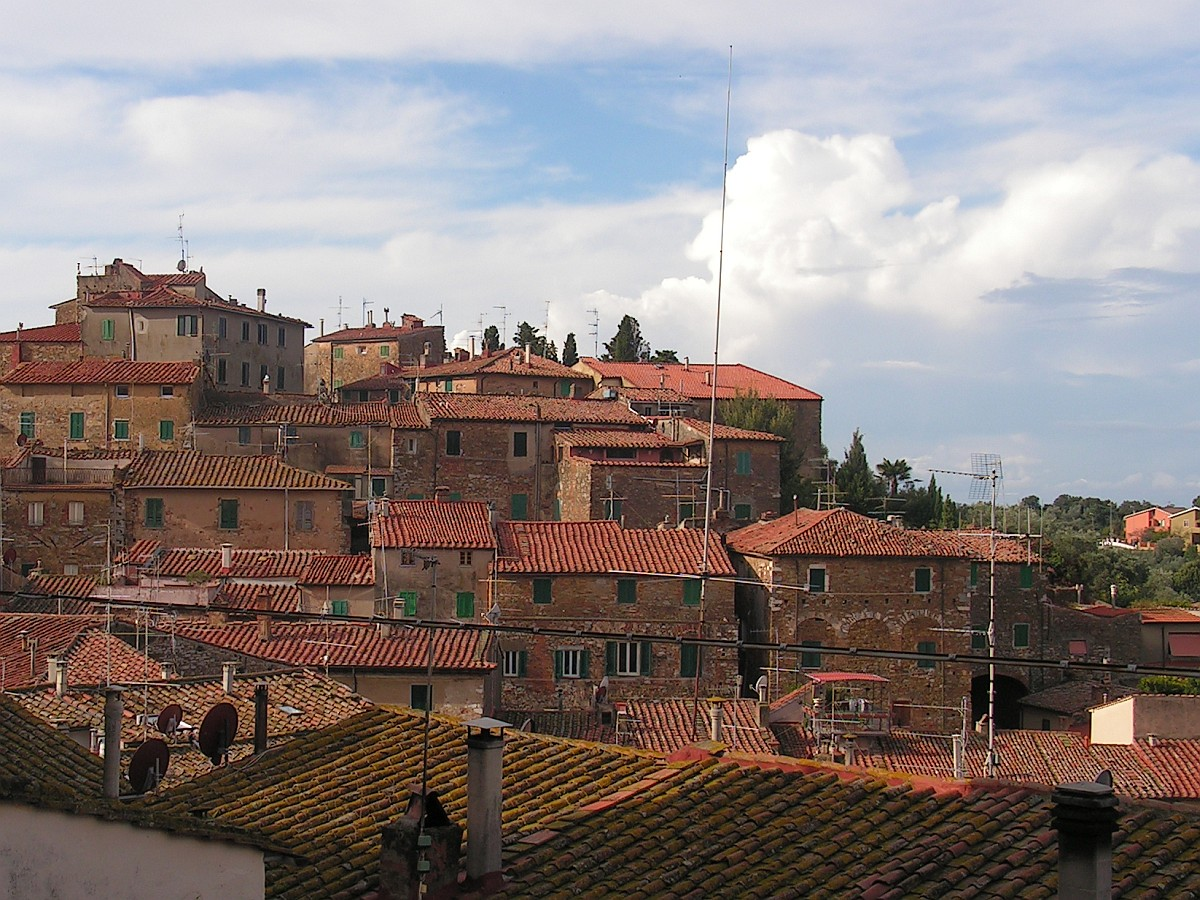
Panorama

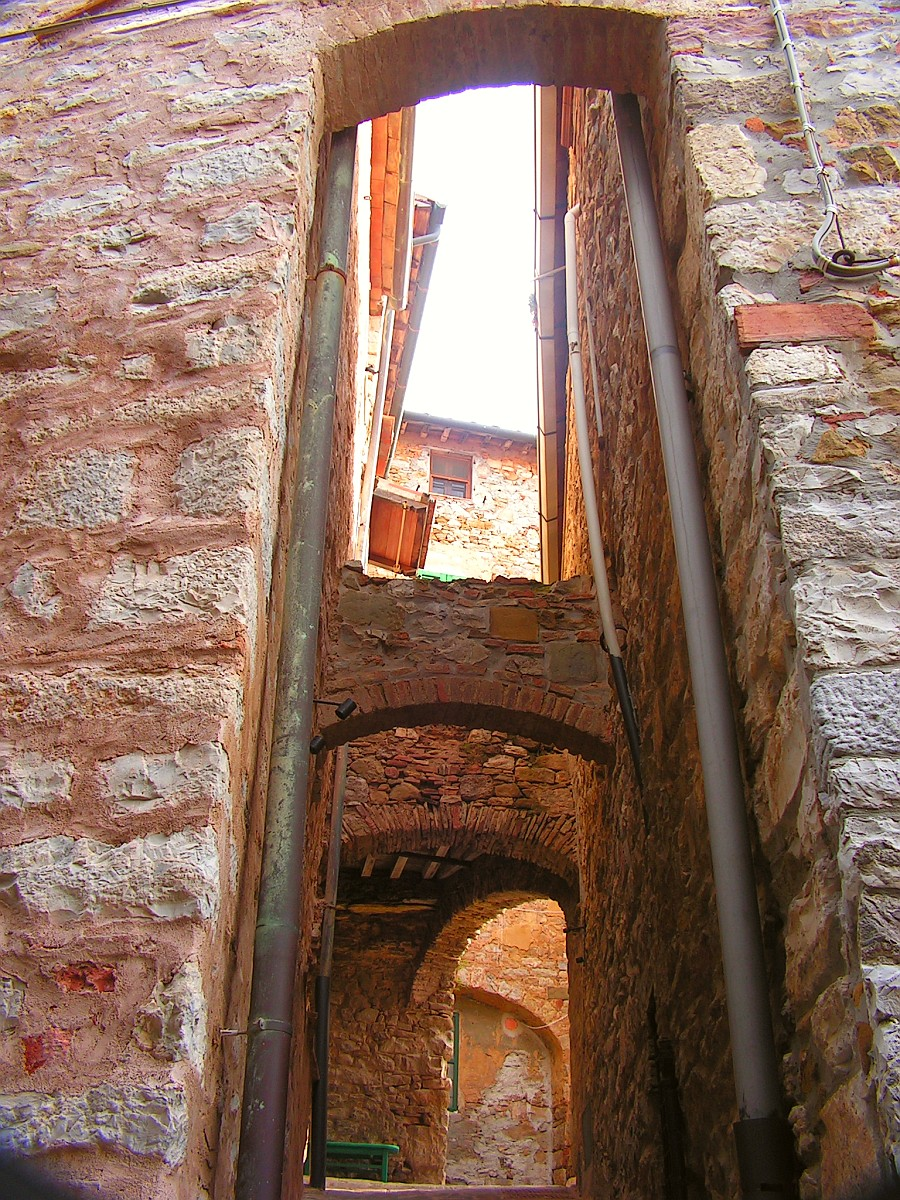
Archi in muratura

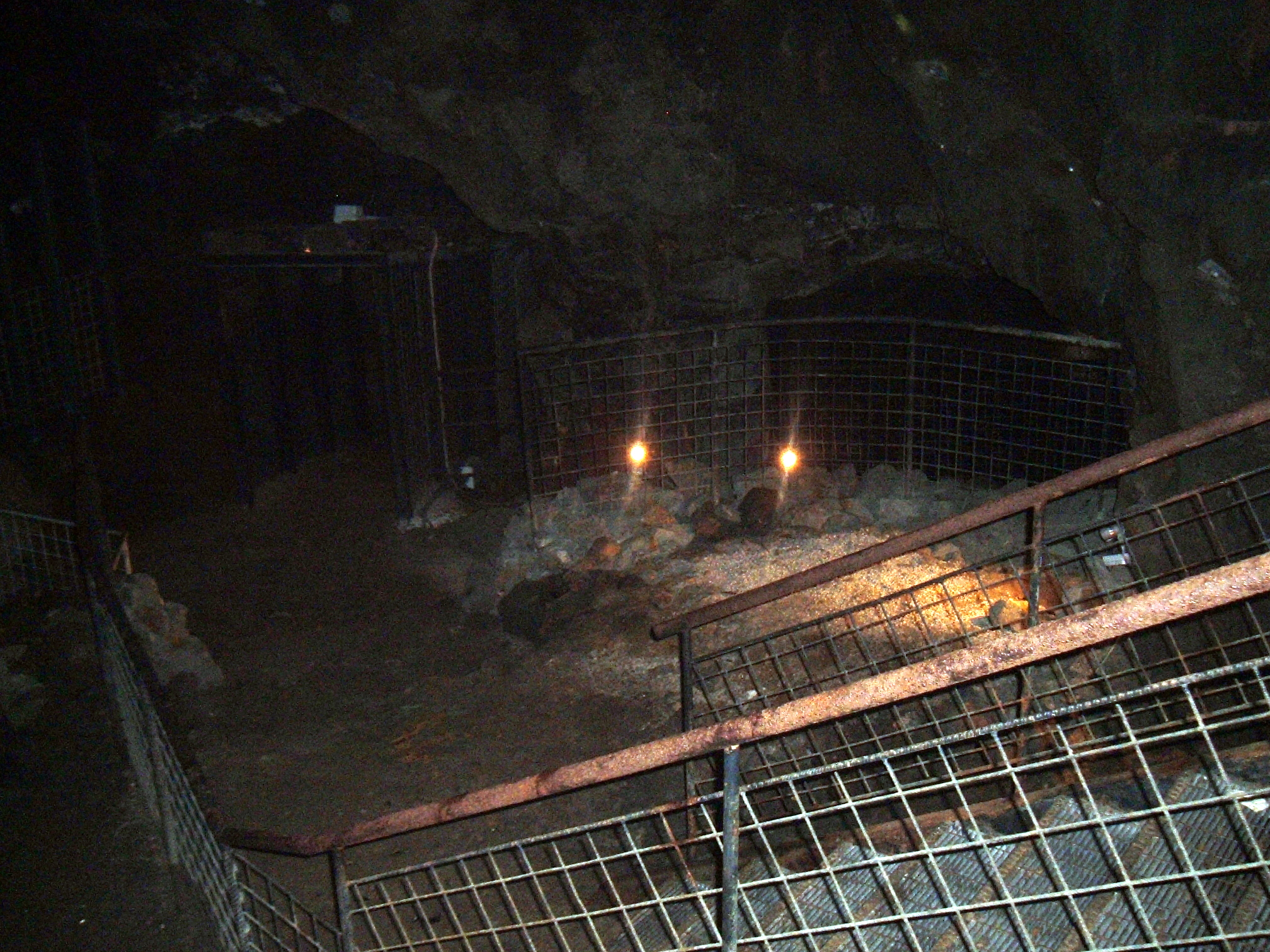
Temperino Mine, in the Archaeological-Mineral Park of San Silvestro

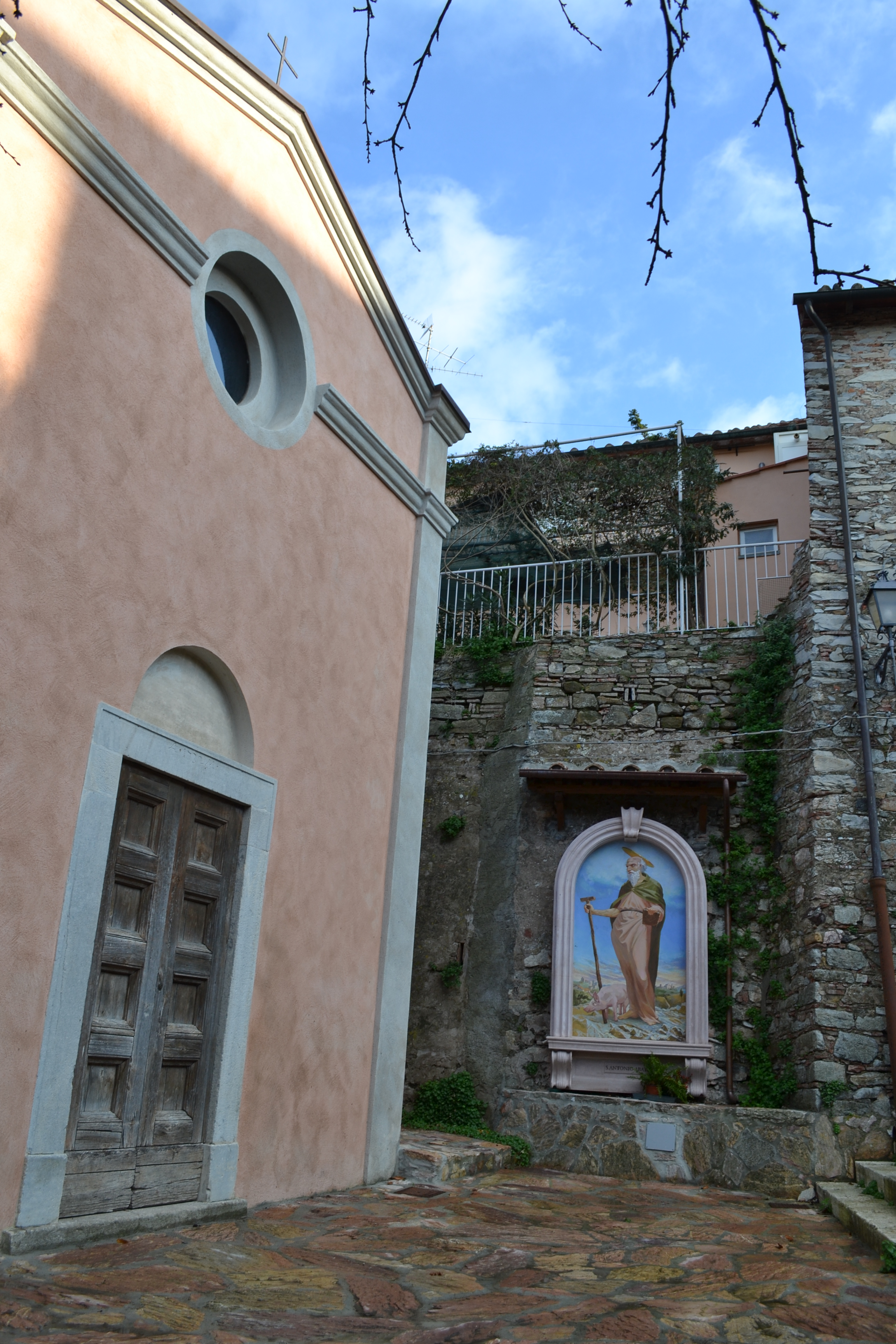
Church of Sant'Antonio

== Bibliography ==
- Isidoro Falchi, Trattenimenti popolari sulla storia della Maremma e di Campiglia Marittima, Prato, 1880.
- Riccardo Belcari, Romanico tirrenico: chiese e monasteri medievali dell'Arcipelago Toscano e del litorale livornese, Pacini, Ospedaletto, 2009.

== See also ==
- Venturina Terme
