= Cafaggio, Campiglia Marittima =

Cafaggio
- Frazione
- Location of Cafaggio in Italy
- Coordinates: 43°2′33″N 10°38′15″E
- Country: Italy
- Region: Tuscany
- Province: Livorno (LI)
- Comune: Campiglia Marittima
- Elevation: 26 m (85 ft)

Population (2011)
  - Total: 407
- Time zone: UTC+1 (CET)
  - Summer (DST): UTC+2 (CEST)
- Postal code: 57021
- Dialing code: (+39) 0565

Cafaggio is a village in Tuscany, central Italy, administratively a frazione of the comune of Campiglia Marittima, province of Livorno. At the time of the 2011 census its population was 407.

Cafaggio is about 70 km (43 mi) from Livorno and 3 km (1.9 mi) from Campiglia Marittima.

== Bibliography ==
- Giovanna Bianchi (2004). Campiglia: un castello e il suo territorio. Firenze: All'insegna del giglio.
