= Master of San Torpè =

Italian painter

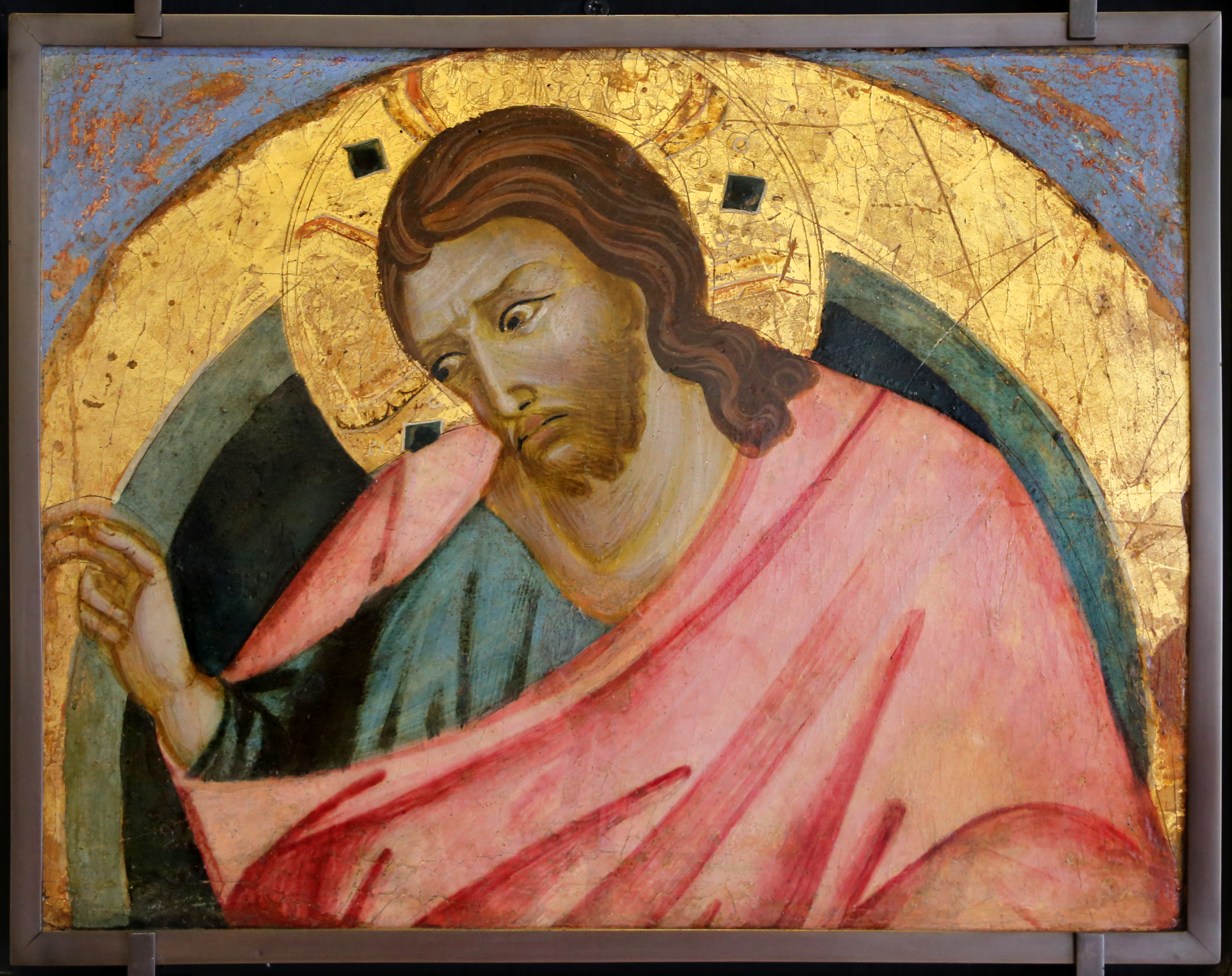
Italian paintings in the Musée du Petit Palais (Avignon)

The Master of San Torpè (active c. 1290 – 1325) is an anonymous Tuscan painter, active around Pisa in Gothic style. Works attributed to this painter are found in Uffizi Gallery, Courtauld Gallery (St Julian), and Seattle Art Museum Kress Collection (Madonna and Child). His name derives from a work originally in the church of San Torpè, Pisa.
