= Cafaggio, Prato =

Cafaggio
- Frazione
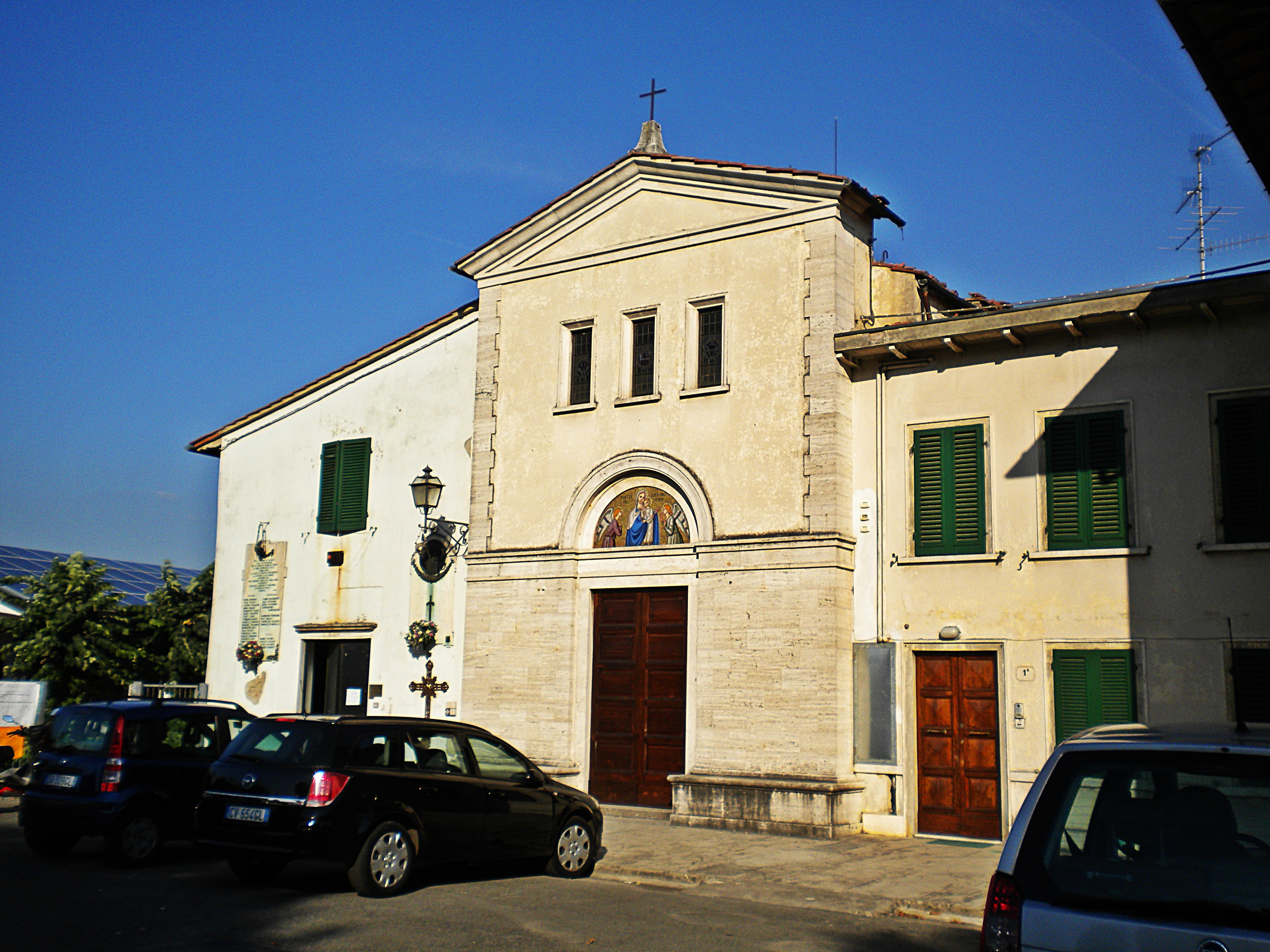
- The church of Santa Maria Assunta in Cafaggio

- Location of Cafaggio in Italy
- Coordinates: 43°51′27″N 11°04′49″E
- Country: Italy
- Region: Tuscany
- Province: Prato (PO)
- Comune: Prato
- Elevation: 26 m (85 ft)

Population
  - Total: 2,400
- Demonym: Cafaggesi
- Time zone: UTC+1 (CET)
  - Summer (DST): UTC+2 (CEST)
- Postal code: 59100
- Dialing code: (+39) 0574

Cafaggio is a village in Tuscany, central Italy, administratively a frazione of the comune of Prato, province of Prato.

Cafaggio is about 70 km from Prato.

== Bibliography ==
- Emanuele Repetti (1883). "Cafaggio". Dizionario Geografico Fisico Storico della Toscana. Florence.
