= Isidoro Falchi =

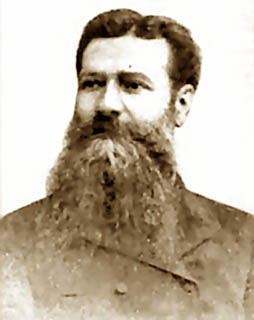
Isidoro Falchi

Isidoro Falchi (Montopoli in Val d'Arno, 26 April 1838 – Campiglia Marittima, 30 April 1914) was an Italian medical doctor and self-taught archaeologist. He is notable for his discovery of the Etruscan remains at Vetulonia and the necropolises at Populonia.

== Sources ==
- "Falchi, Isidoro" in Dizionario Biografico degli Italiani, vol. 44, Roma 1994.
