= Venturina Terme =

- Frazione
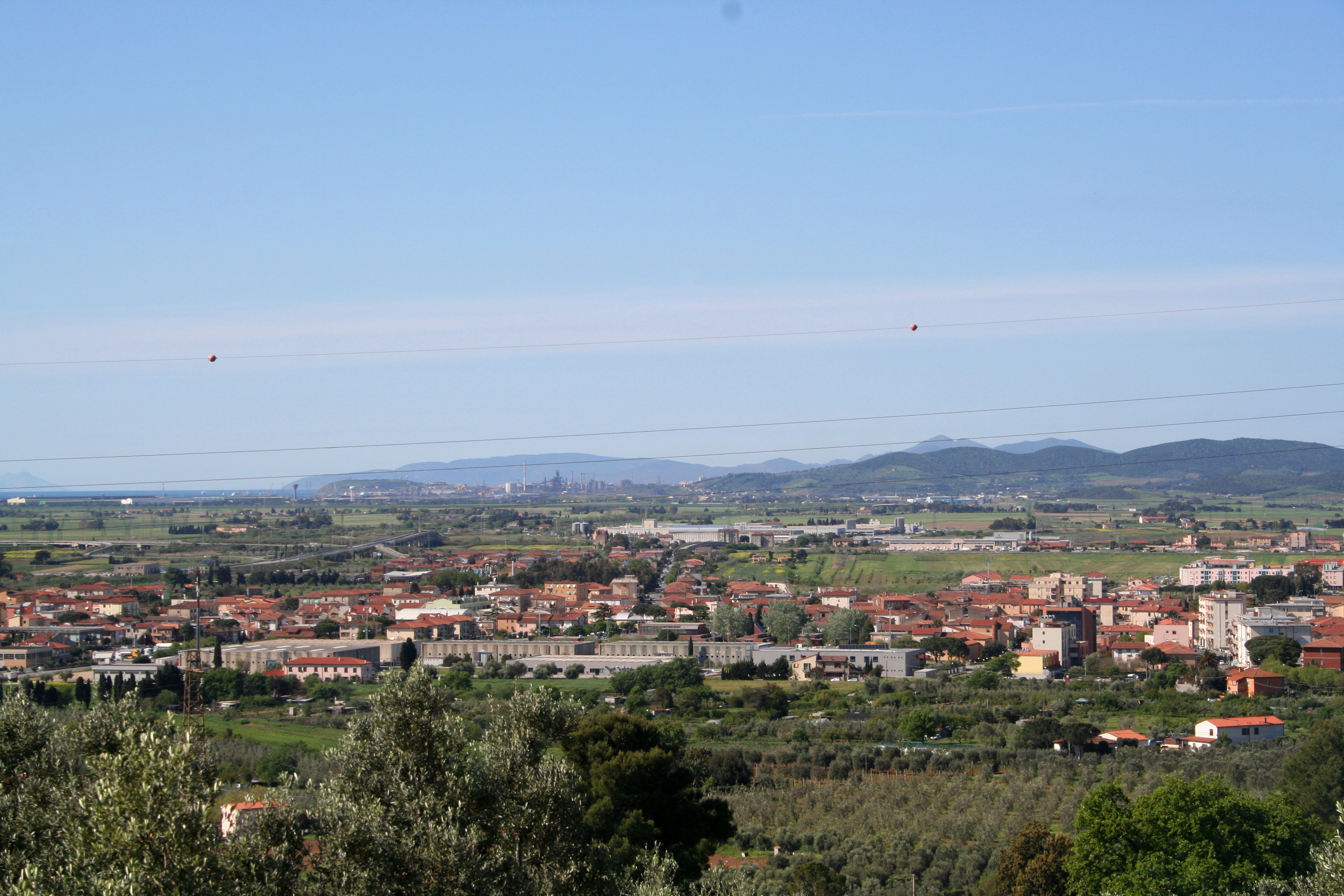
- View of Venturina Terme

- Location of Venturina Terme in Italy
- Coordinates: 43°01′40″N 10°36′12″E
- Country: Italy
- Region: Tuscany
- Province: Livorno
- Comune: Campiglia Marittima
- Elevation: 15 m (49 ft)

Population (2011)
  - Total: 9,004
- Demonym: Venturinesi
- Time zone: UTC+1 (CET)
  - Summer (DST): UTC+2 (CEST)
- Postal code: 57021
- Dialing code: 0565

Venturina Terme is a frazione of the comune of Campiglia Marittima (Tuscany, central Italy). Formerly known as Venturina, it was renamed as Venturina Terme since 1 January 2014 for the importance of its thermal activities.

== Overview ==
Situated along the ancient Roman road Aurelia, Venturina Terme is a modern town developed around industrial, agricultural, commercial and thermal activities.

== History ==
Although the toponym Venturina is quite recent, traces of human settlement have been attested since Etruscan age when this area was known for its hot springs. It was later called Aquae Populoniae by the Romans. During the Middle Ages, the area became depopulated due to the vicinity of noxious marshes. In 1863, when the railway through the Maremma region was inaugurated, Campiglia Marittima station was built close to Venturina for its strategic position. Since the early 20th century, thanks to the drainage of the marshes and the development of Piombino's industrial area, the town gradually began to expand and increase its population.

== Main sights ==
=== Roman mausoleum of Caio Trebazio ===
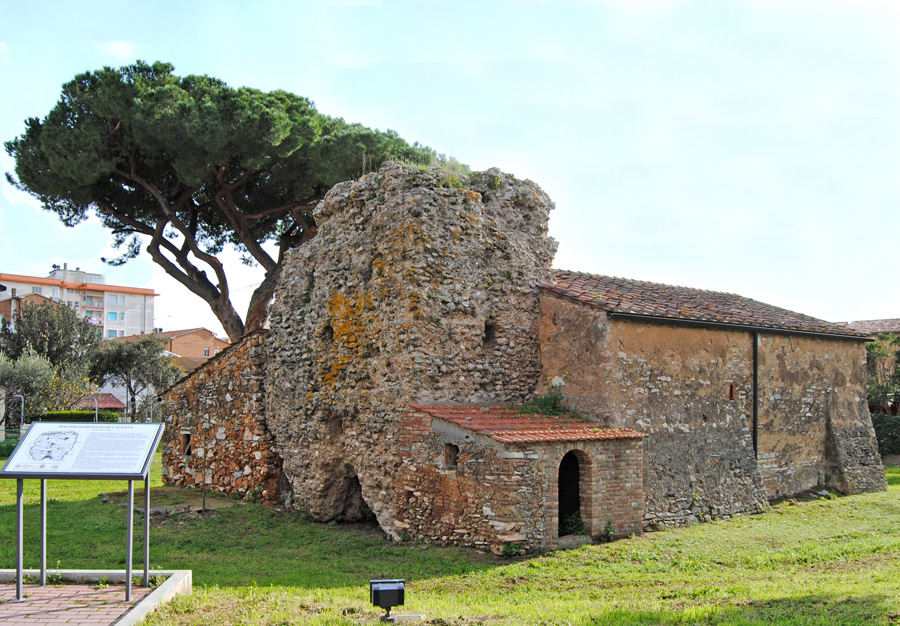
Roman mausoleum of Caio Trebazio

Known also as Roman mausoleum of Caldana from the name of this area, the building traces back to the 1st century A.D. and was probably built as a monumental sepulchre close to the Roman road Aurelia since ancient Romans used to erect tombs, particularly for notable people, along suburban stretches of the main roads. The sarcophagus, today missing, contained human remains of a prominent figure in connection with the Roman society settled in the nearby town of Populonia and was supposed to be located close to the opening at the base of the structure. In 1964, Father Enrico Lombardi suggested to associate the sepulchre with Caius Trebatius, a Roman aristocrat whose name was inscribed in a signet ring found in the vicinity of Venturina, though this attribution remains purely an assumption.

=== Labour History Museum ===
The Labour History Museum focuses on the history of economical activities in the Val di Cornia during the latest two centuries. It contains a collection of 12.000 working tools related to farm work and other traditional professions such as cooper, blacksmith, tinsmith, harness maker. The exhibition is hosted inside the trade fair zone in Venturina Terme and is maintained by volunteers of a local association. In the oper public park, next the museum, an early 20th century steam locomotive has been placed in 1994.

=== Churches ===
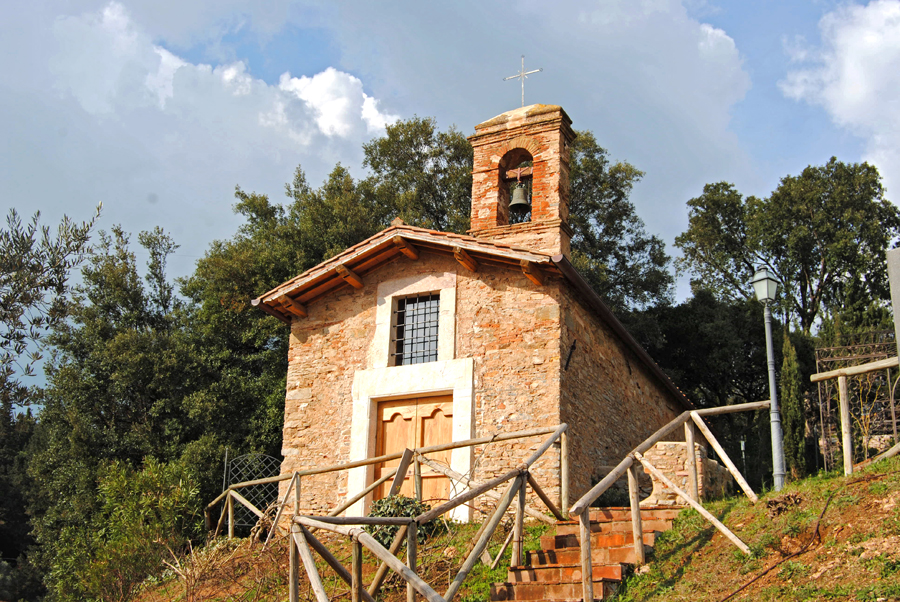
Oratory of Santa Lucia

- Parish church of Holy Family: the construction of the building began in September 1922 and the church was blessed in 1934. However, in 1966 it was demolished and rebuilt with subsequent consecration in 1967. The present building has a three-aisle plan with reinforced concrete trusses to support the central nave. A 17th-century painting depicting a Madonna and Child, copy of the one worshipped in the Sanctuary of Montenero (Livorno), is preserved inside the church.
- Oratory of Santa Lucia: it's the oldest religious building in Venturina Terme, located near the small lake of Bottaccio, formed by a natural spring and today included in the spa town of Calidario. The small oratory was built in the 16th century and later enlarged. It has been recently restored and opened to the public with an inauguration ceremony held on 13 December 2015, Saint Lucy's Day.

== Notable residents ==
- Péter Zwack (1927 – 2012), Hungarian businessman, investor, philanthropist, diplomat, CEO and owner of the company Zwack

== Gallery ==
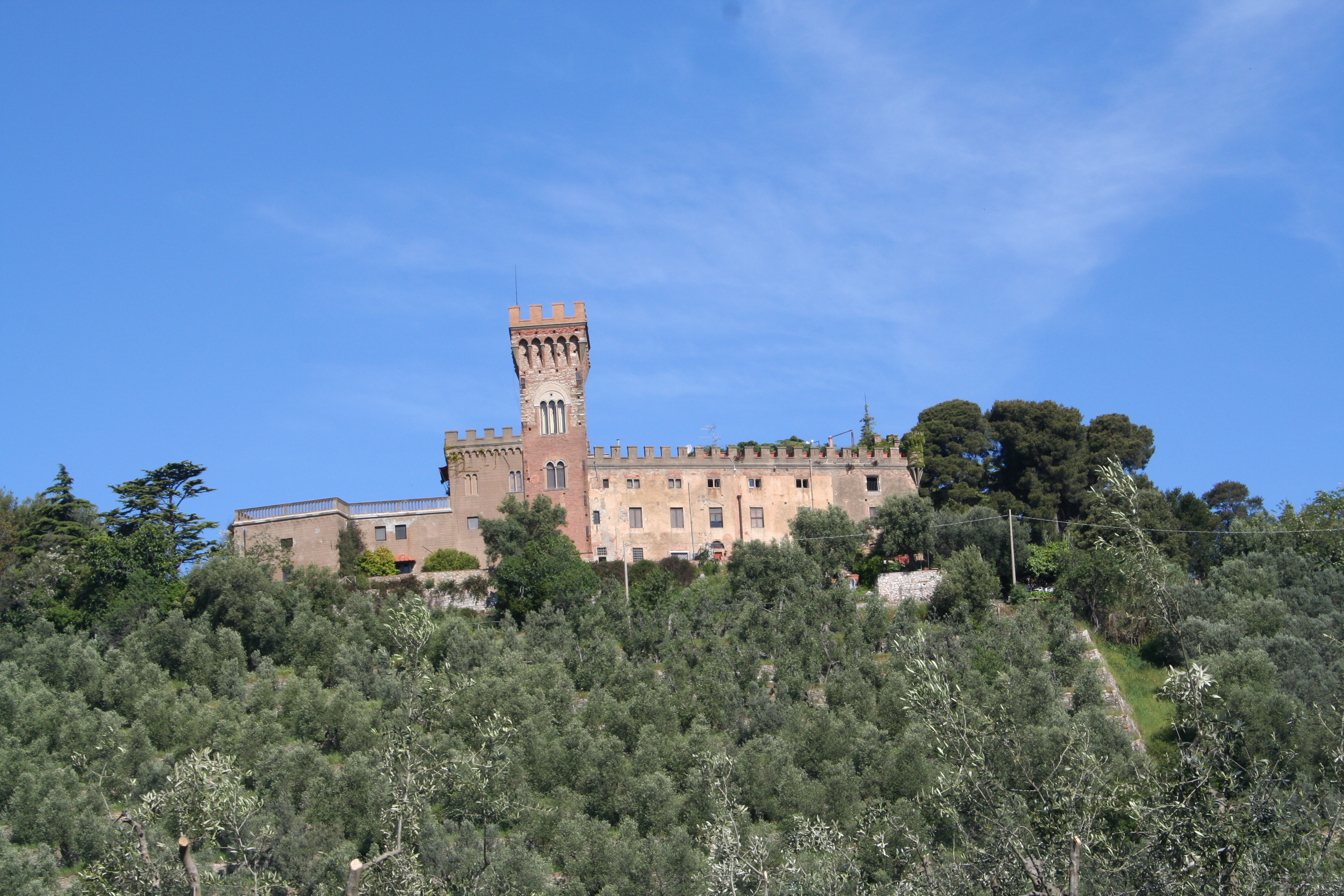
Castello della Magona

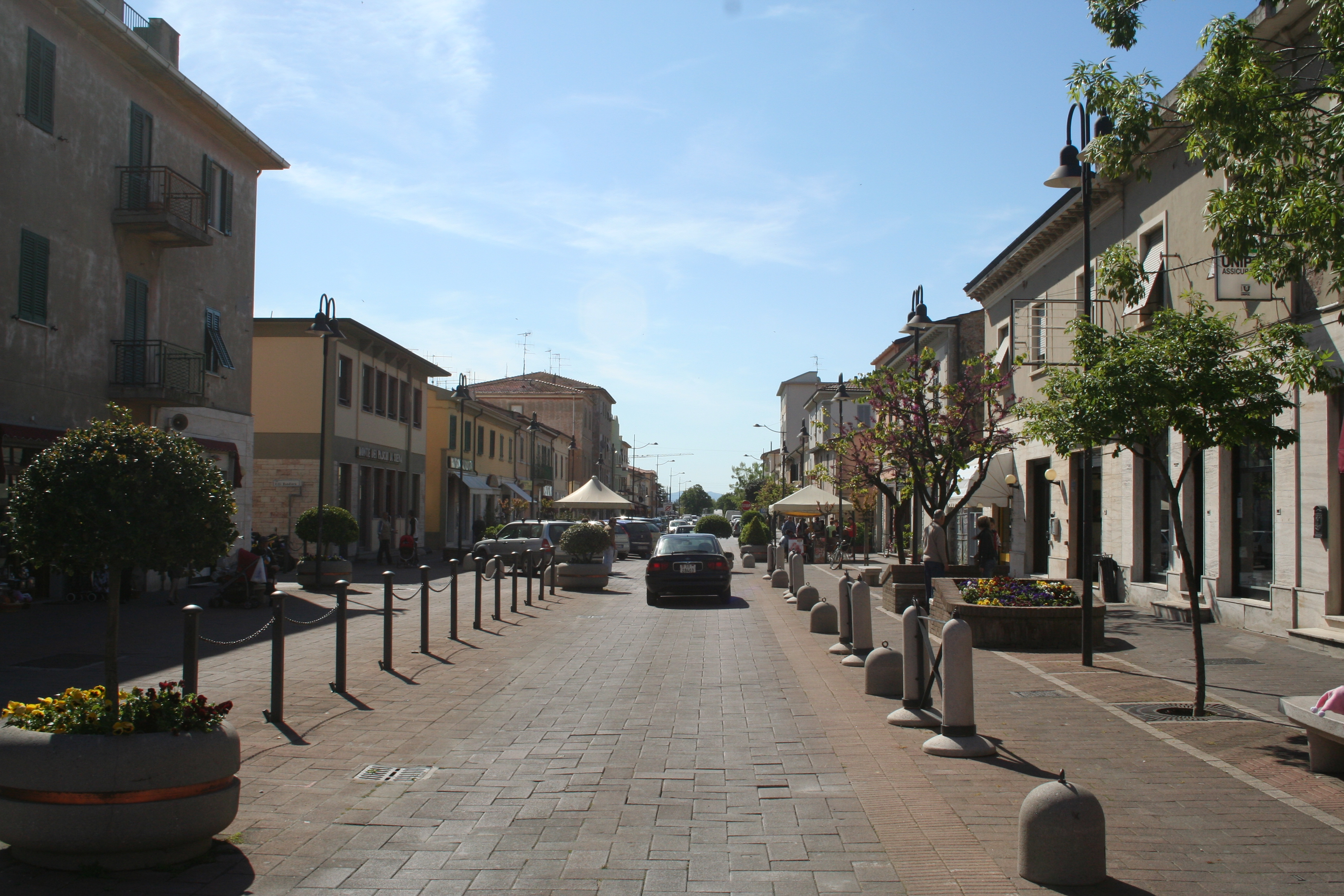
Via Indipendenza

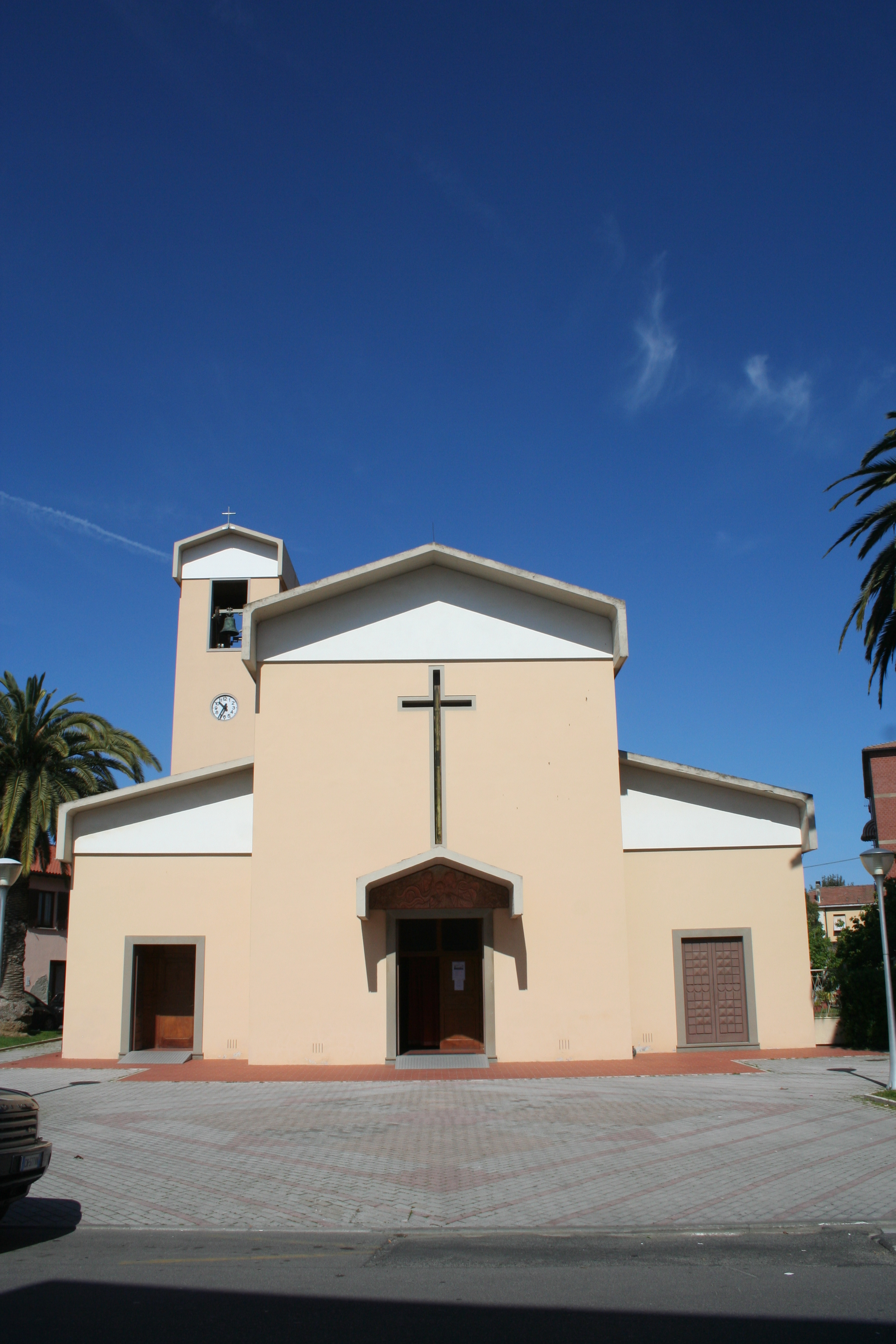
Parish church of Holy Family

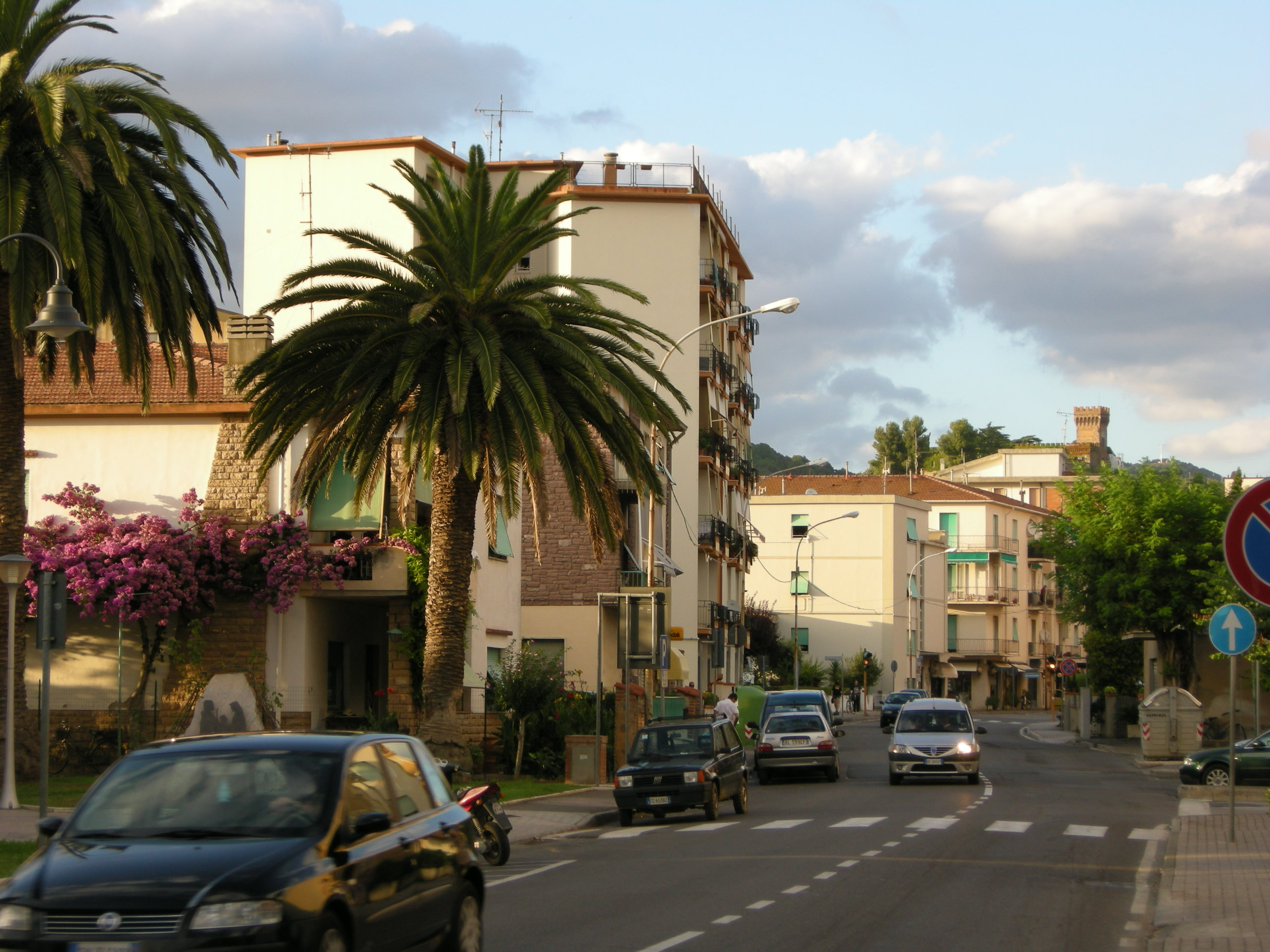
Via Dante Alighieri

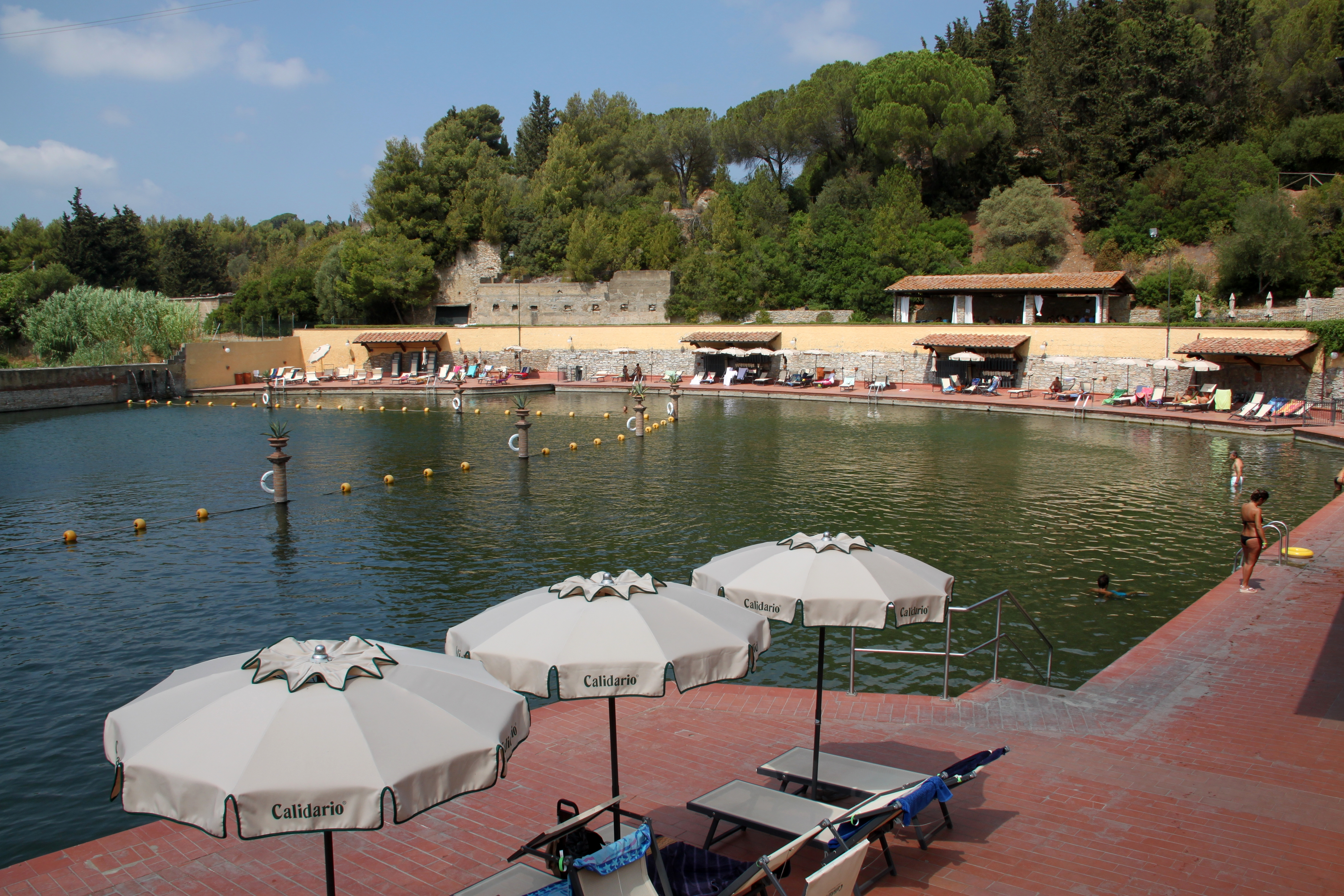
Calidario (bagno termale)
