= Figline Valdarno railway station =

Railway station in Tuscany

Figline Valdarno
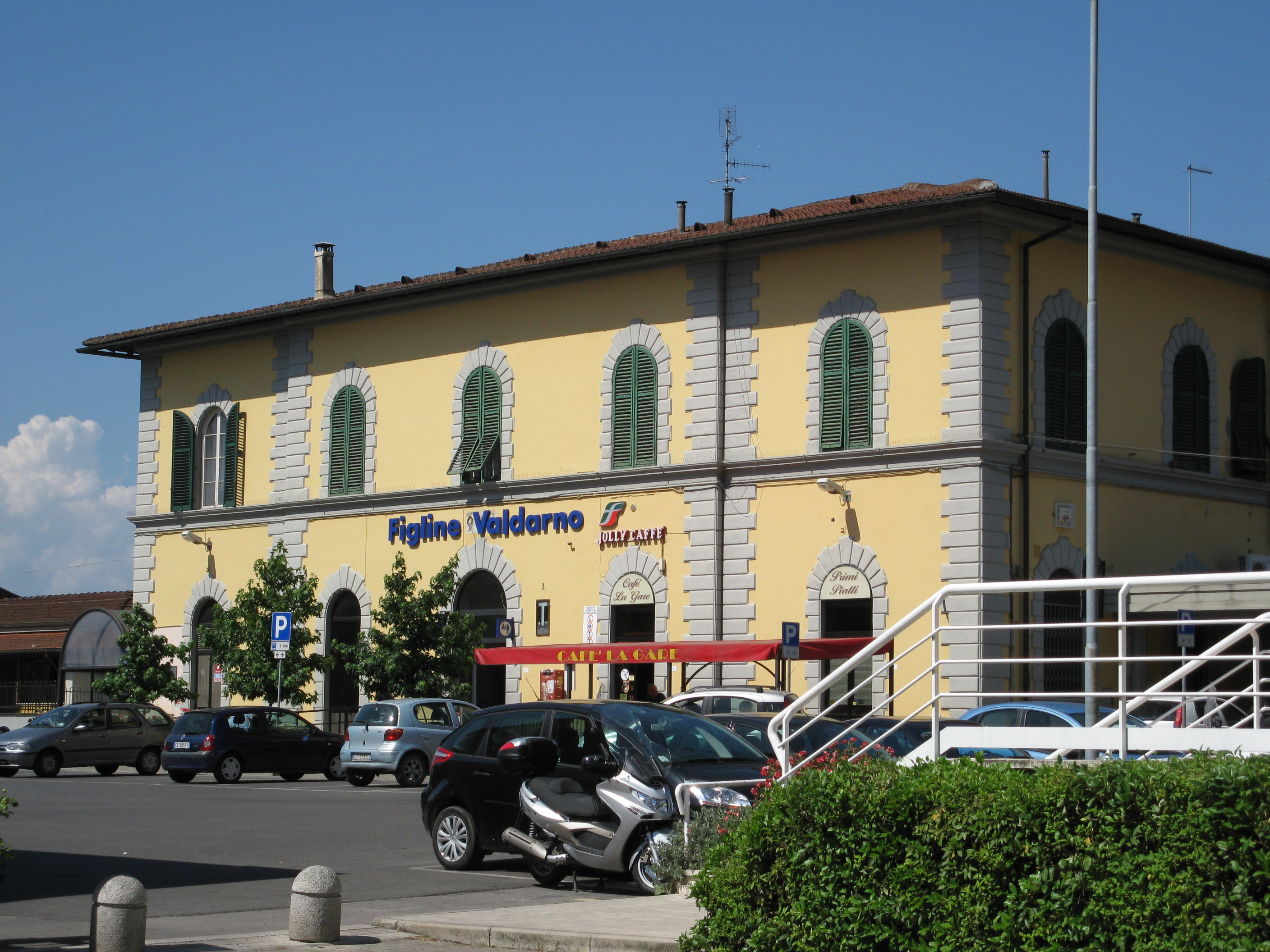
- Figline Valdarno railway station

General information
- Location: Piazza della Repubblica 2 Figline Valdarno, Florence, Tuscany; Italy
- Coordinates: 43°37′18″N 11°28′24″E
- Elevation: 126 above sea level
- Operator: Rete Ferroviaria Italiana
- Line: Florence - Rome
- Distance: 41 km
- Platforms: 4
- Train operators: Trenitalia
- Connections: Etruria Mobilità and Autolinee del Chianti e del Valdarno buses

Other information
- Classification: Silver

History
- Opened: 8 April 1863; 163 years ago
- Electrified: 1935
Location
- Location within Tuscany Location within Italy

The railway station of Figline Valdarno serves the Tuscan town of Figline Valdarno. The station situated on the Florence–Rome railway line, 40 km from Florence, on the stretch between Florence and Arezzo. It is mostly used by commuters coming from Figline Valdarno, Reggello and Pian di Scò going to Florence.

Figline Valdarno railway station is the seventeenth station (for number of passengers, architectural value of the station etc.) of Tuscany.

The freight yard is no longer used and the buildings are let to members of the public or used for stocking equipment for line maintenance. The tracks of the freight yard are also used for keeping line maintenance machinery. The nearest freight yard still operating is San Giovanni Valdarno.

There are many monitors (two in the station, two for the platforms 2 and 3, one in the subway) displaying train departures and arrivals.

The station has two automatic ticket machines and two drink and snack dispensers. The ticket office is open from 6:20 am to 7:40 pm. The station also has a waiting room.

== Services ==
The station is situated near the connection with the "direttissima" (high speed track). One train an hour passes on the direttissima without stopping. It arrives in Florence in less than 20 minutes. The other trains pass from the slow line via Pontassieve.

All regional trains stop at the station.

The first train arrives at 5.12 in the morning and the last one leaves the station at 23.56.

Outside the station (piazza della repubblica side) there is also a taxi service with numbers displayed on posters outside the station.

The station is part of the Memorario project which provide a regular timetable.

=== Northbound ===
- Minute 03: trains going to Florence via Pontassieve calling in all stations.
- Minute 20: trains going to Florence via high speed line with no intermediate stops.
- Minute 29: trains going to Prato or continue to Pistoia calling in all stations.
- Minute 42: trains going to Florence via Pontassieve calling in all stations except Combiobbi and Firenze Rovezzano.

=== Southbound ===
- Minute 16: trains going to Arezzo calling in San Giovanni Valdarno and Montevarchi.
- Minute 29: trains going to Montevarchi calling in San Giovanni Valdarno.
- Minute 38: trains going to Rome or Foligno calling in all stations except for Bucine, Laterina, Ponticino.
- Minute 56: trains going to Arezzo calling in all stations.

== Station layout ==
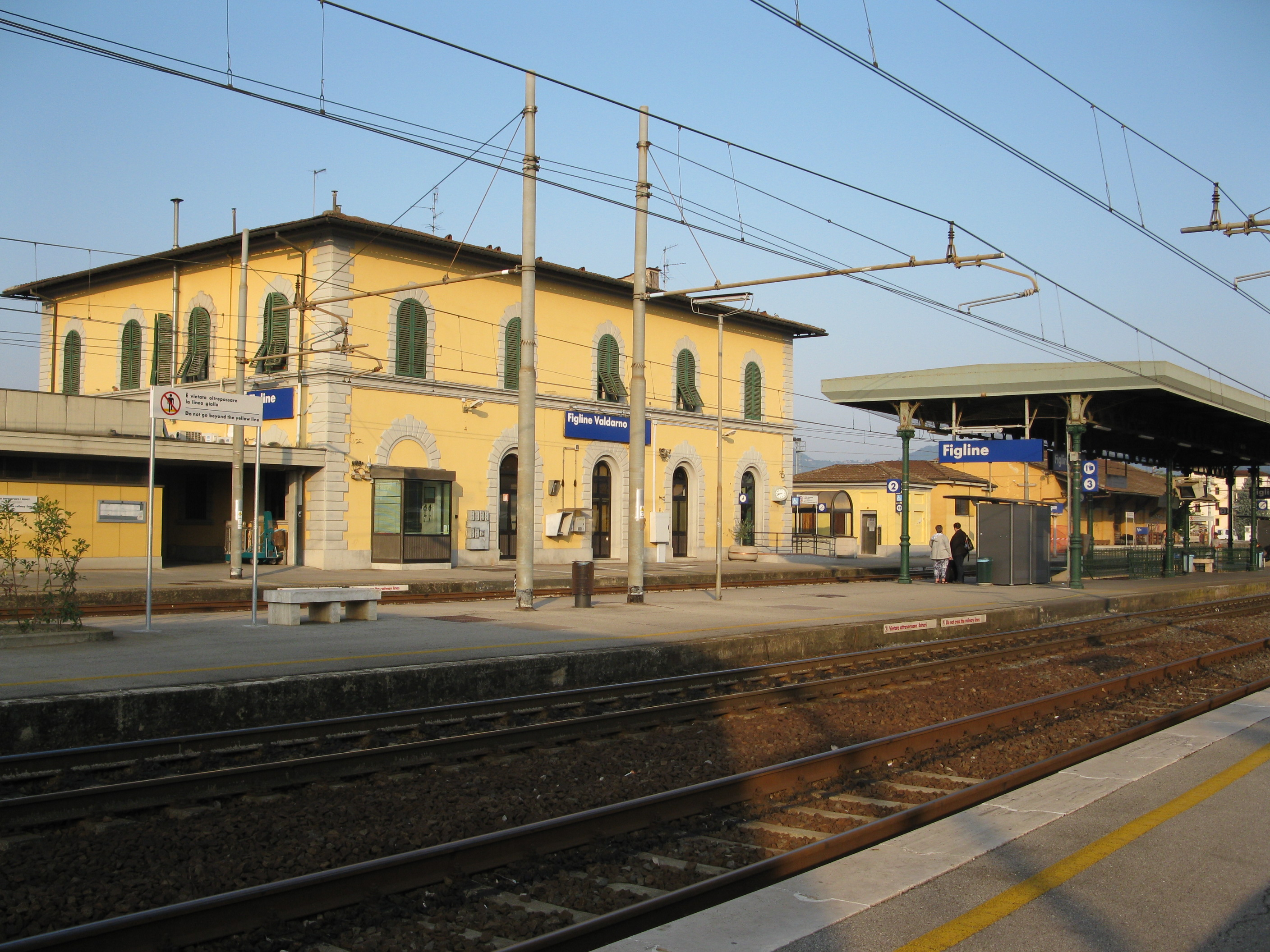

The station has four platforms with station-roofs, connected by a subway. Platform 1 is used for trains that terminate in Figline or interchanges. The trains going to Florence use platform 2 while platform 3 is used for trains going to Arezzo. Platform 4 is used for interregional trains towards Perugia, Foligno and Rome. The line on which the station is situated is electrified.

Tracks
1	■Florence-Rome railway line	Used for train interchange
2	■Florence-Rome railway line	To Florence, Prato, Pistoia
3	■Florence-Rome railway line	To Montevarchi, Arezzo, Chiusi
4	■Florence-Rome railway line	To Foligno, Rome

== Adjacent stations ==
Previous	Line	Next
San Giovanni Valdarno	Florence–Rome high-speed railway line (direttissima: high speed line)	Firenze Campo di Marte
San Giovanni Valdarno	Florence-Rome railway line (low speed line)	Incisa Valdarno

== History ==
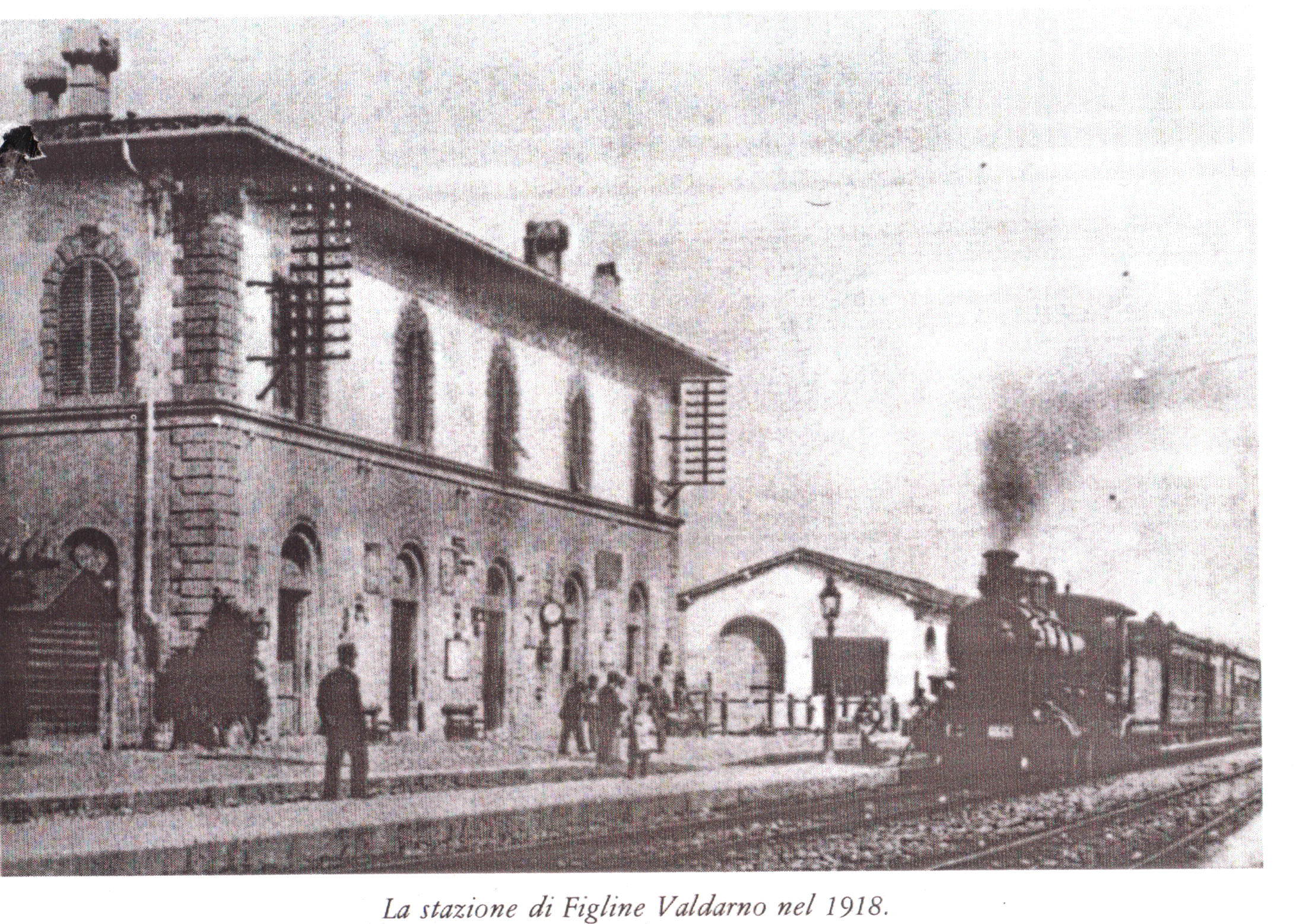
View of the station in 1918

The station was opened in 1863 by the Roman Railway Company with the opening of the Pontassieve-Montevarchi. A few years later the line was extended Terontola. The main building of the station is the original structure dating back to 1863 and avoided destruction in World War II . Until the second half of the twentieth century only platform 1 existed, the other tracks didn't have a platform. Also the station roof and the subway was built later. Platform 4 was built when the "direttisima" high speed line arrived in Figline in 1986.

== Bus connections ==
Nearby the station (in via della Vetreria, Piazza della Repubblica side), there is the bus terminal. This terminal is used to connect towns unreachable by rail. The service is operated by Etruria Mobilità for the Province of Arezzo (Pian di Scò, Castelfranco di Sopra, Loro Ciuffenna) Autolinee del Chianti e del Valdarno for the Province of Florence (Reggello, Lucolena, San Polo in Chianti, Vallombrosa ).

== Gallery ==
=== Summer ===
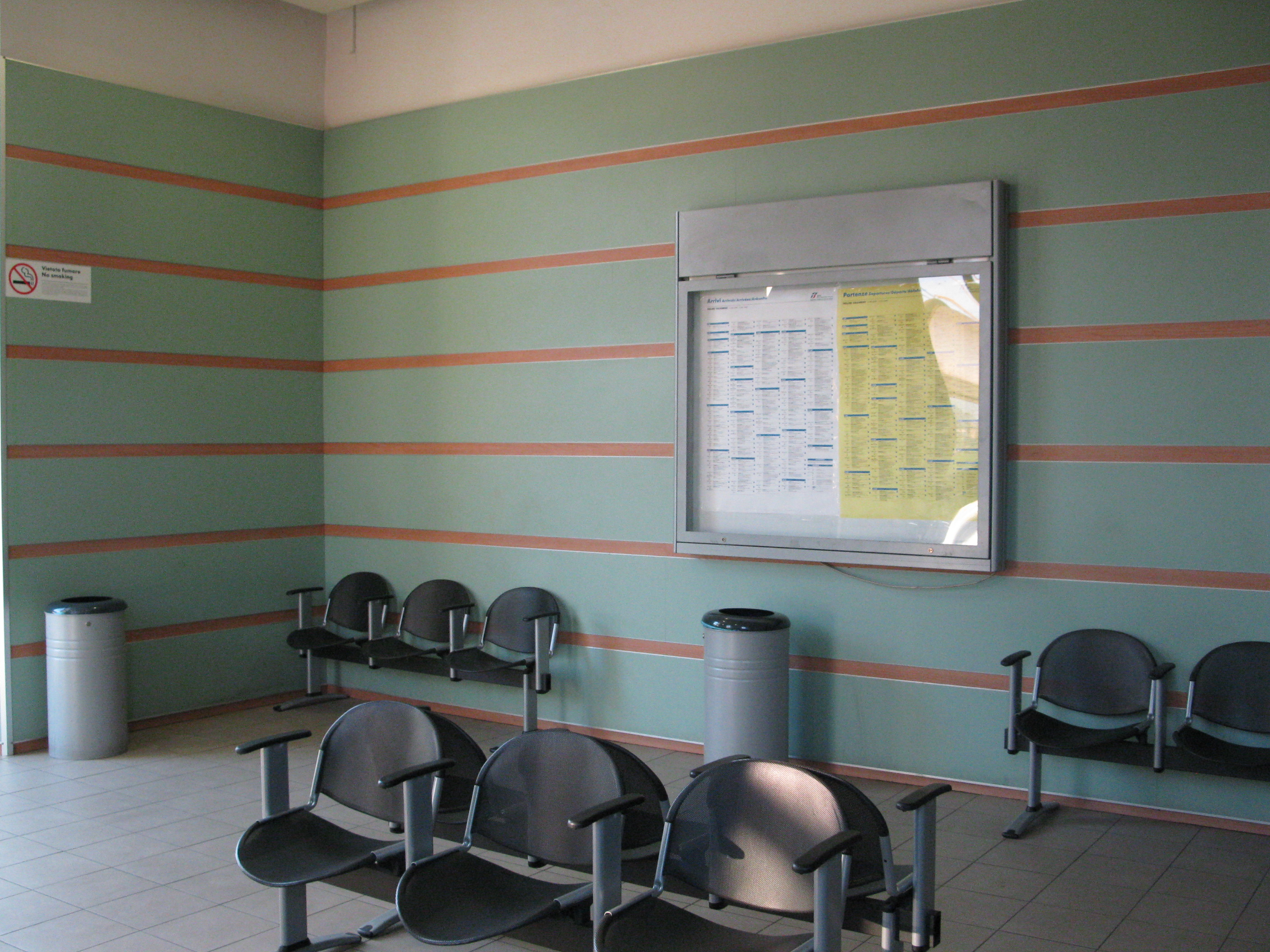
Waiting room

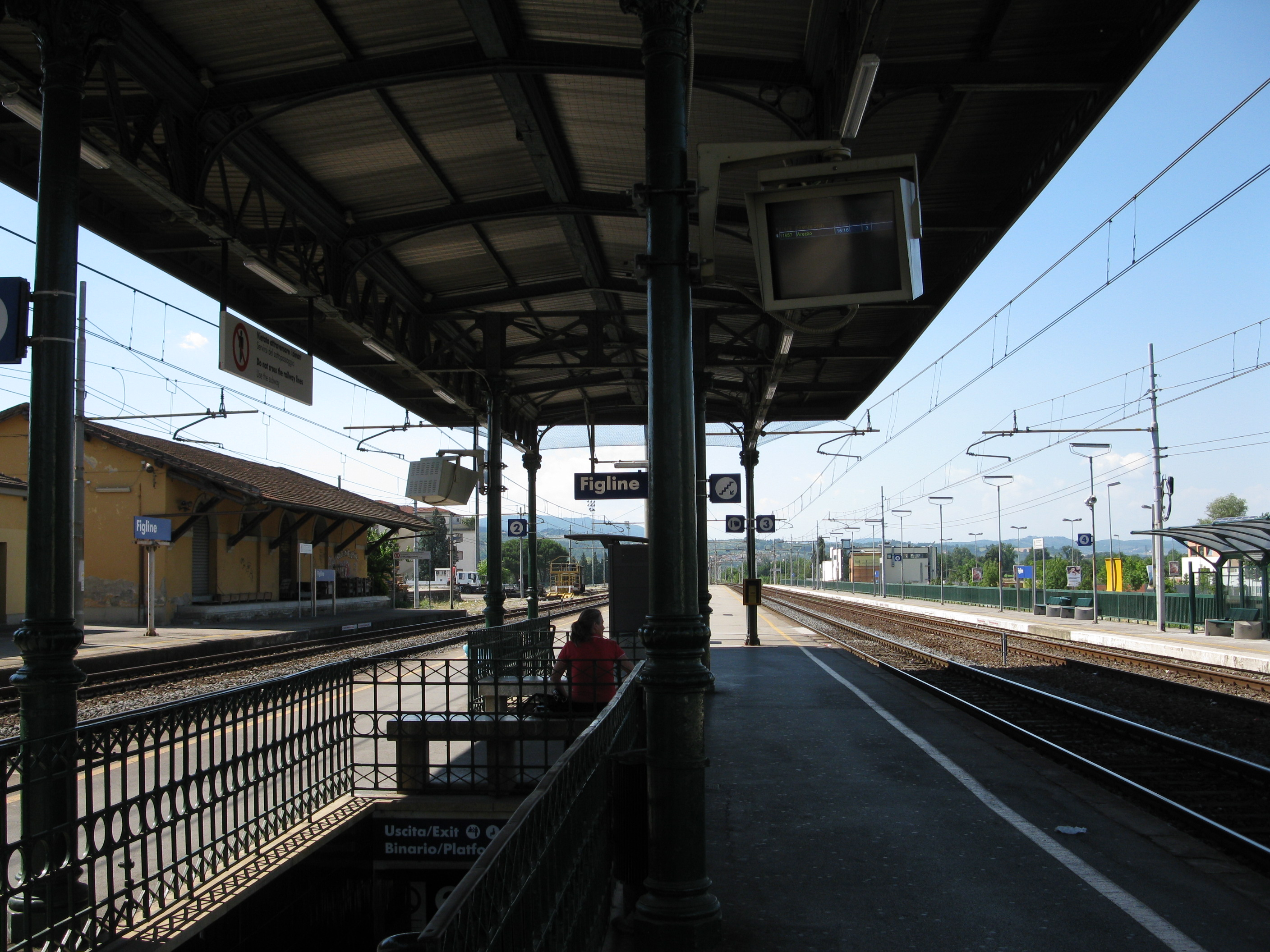
Station roof of platforms 2 and 3

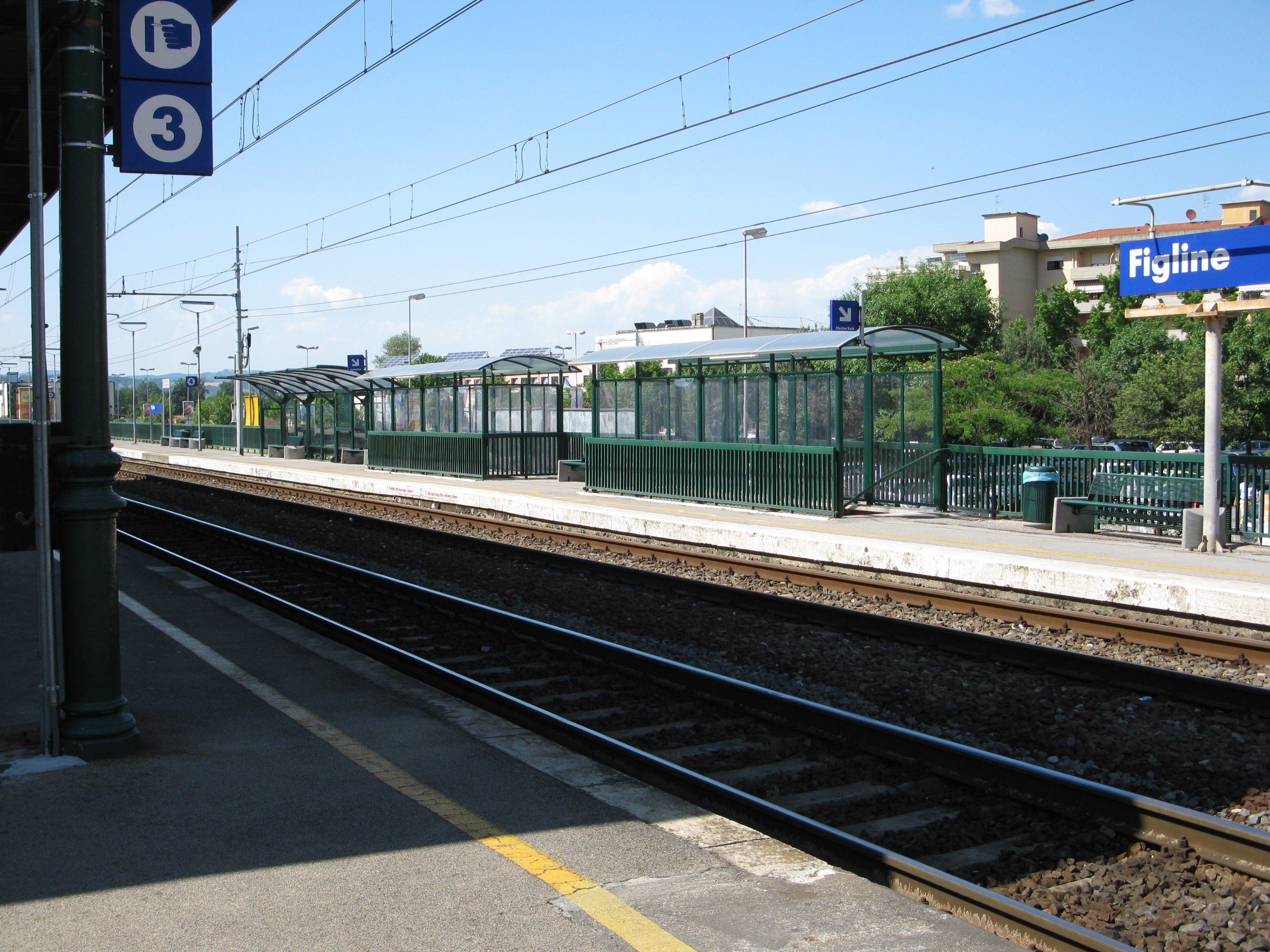
Station roof of platform 4

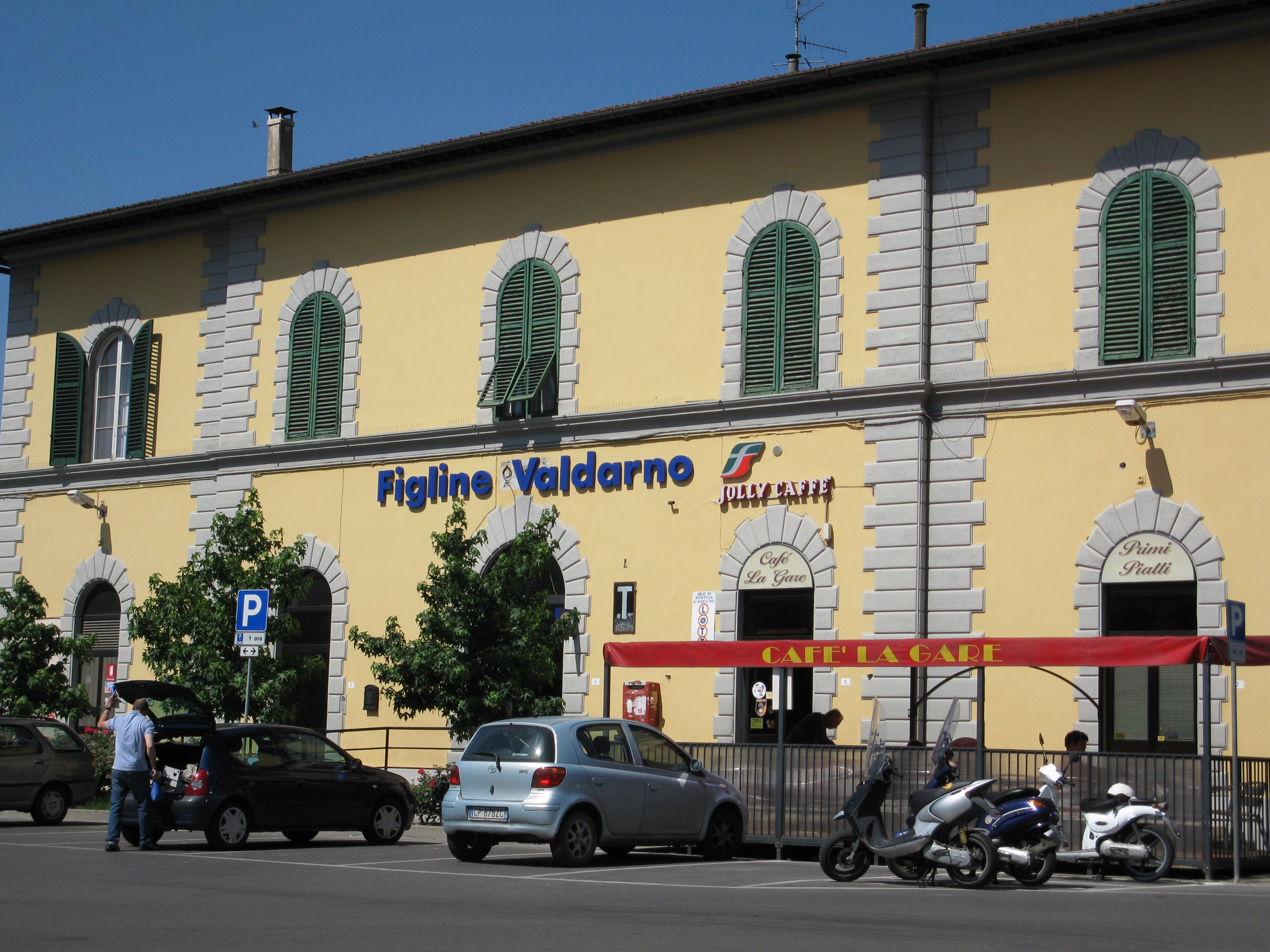
View of the station from Piazza della Repubblica

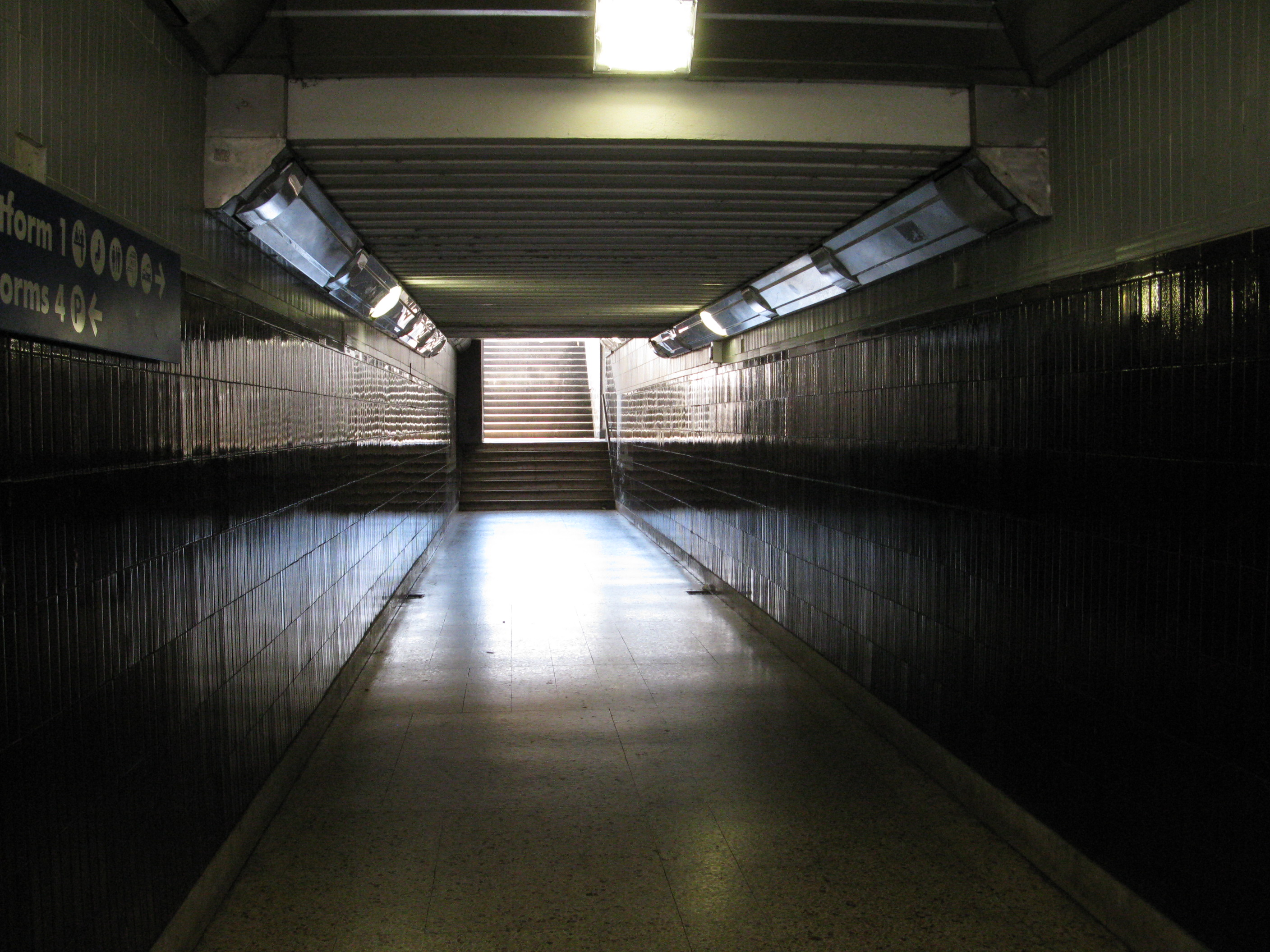
Underpass

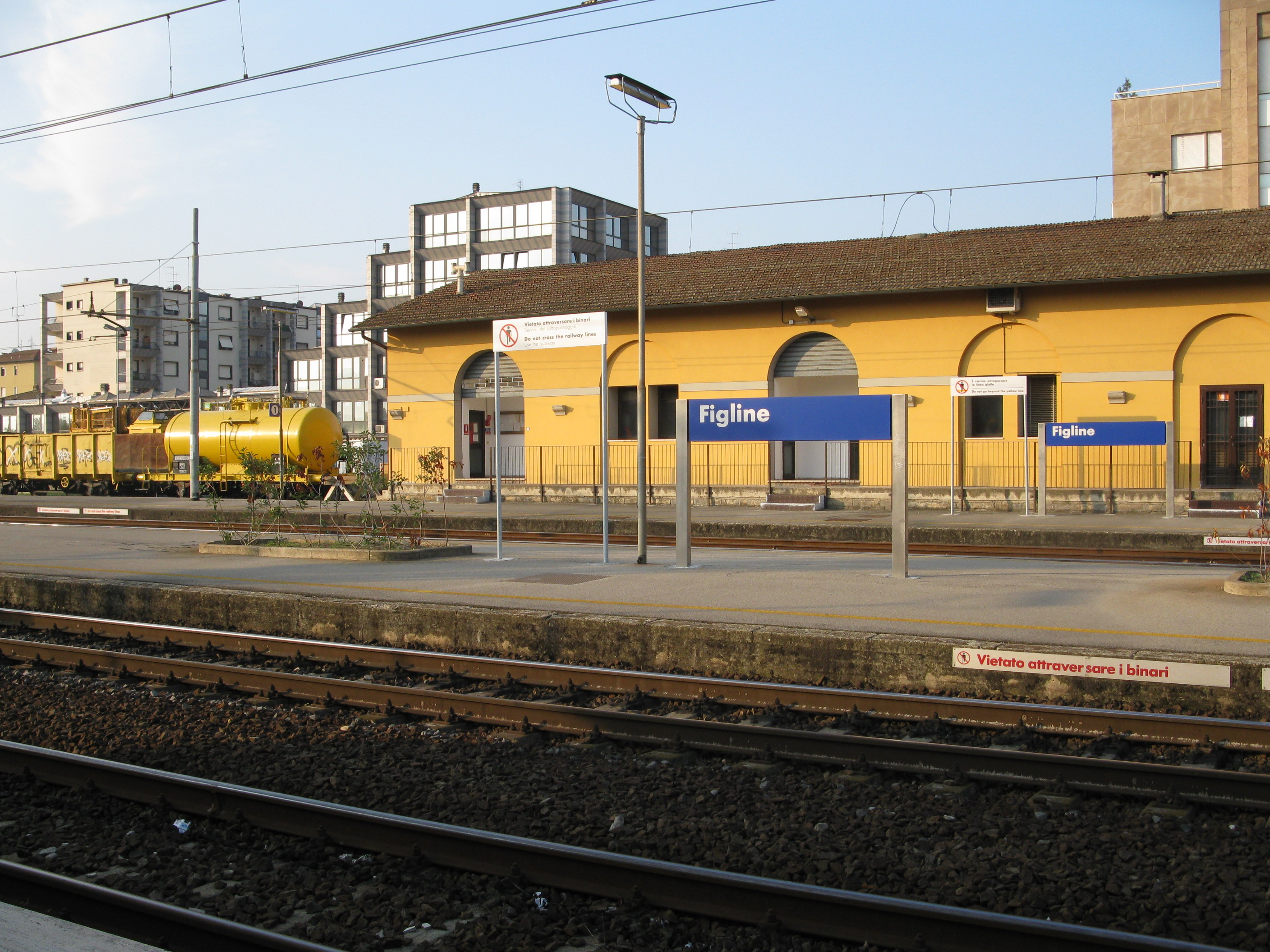
Line maintenance deposit

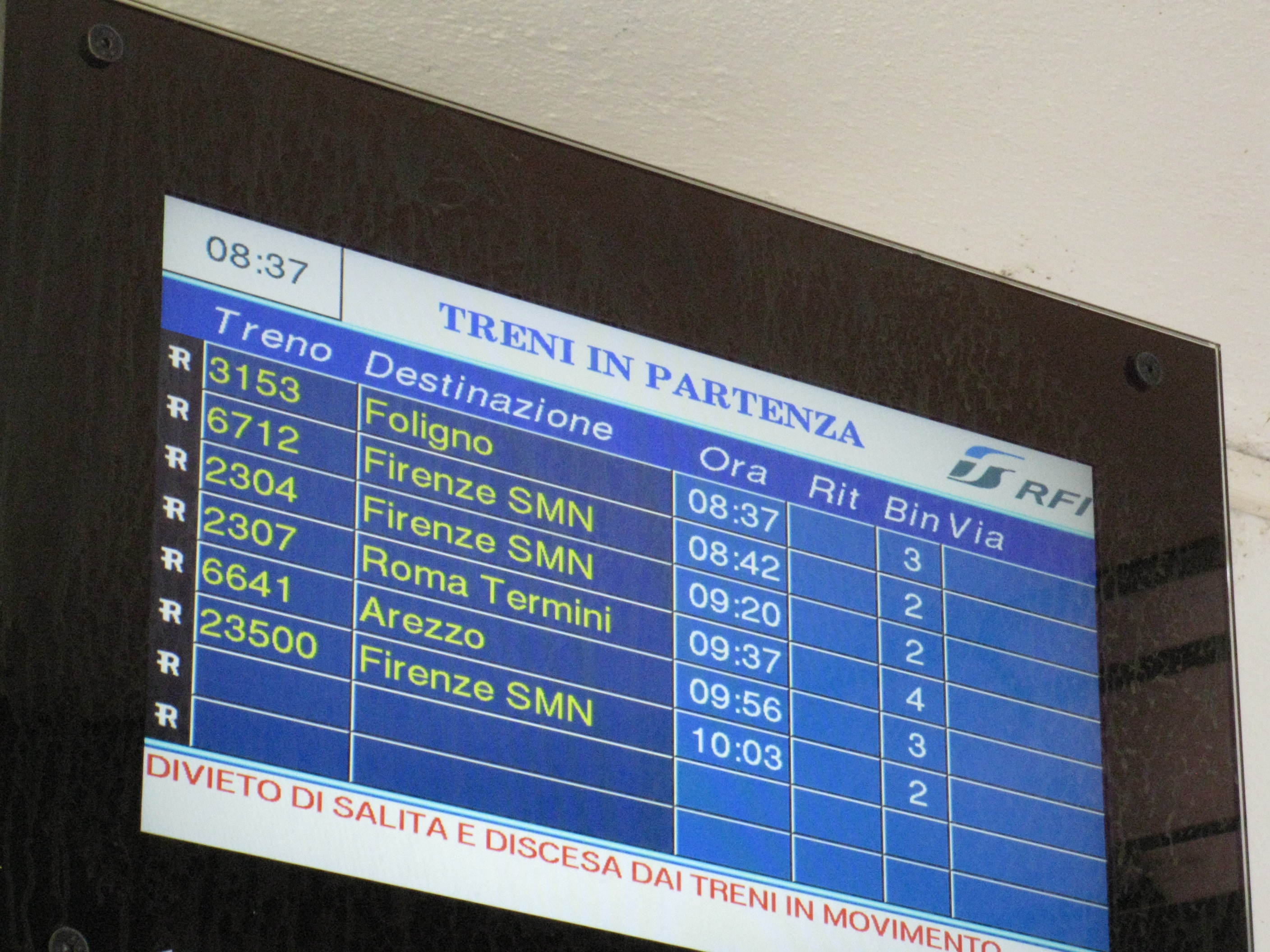
Monitor

=== Winter ===
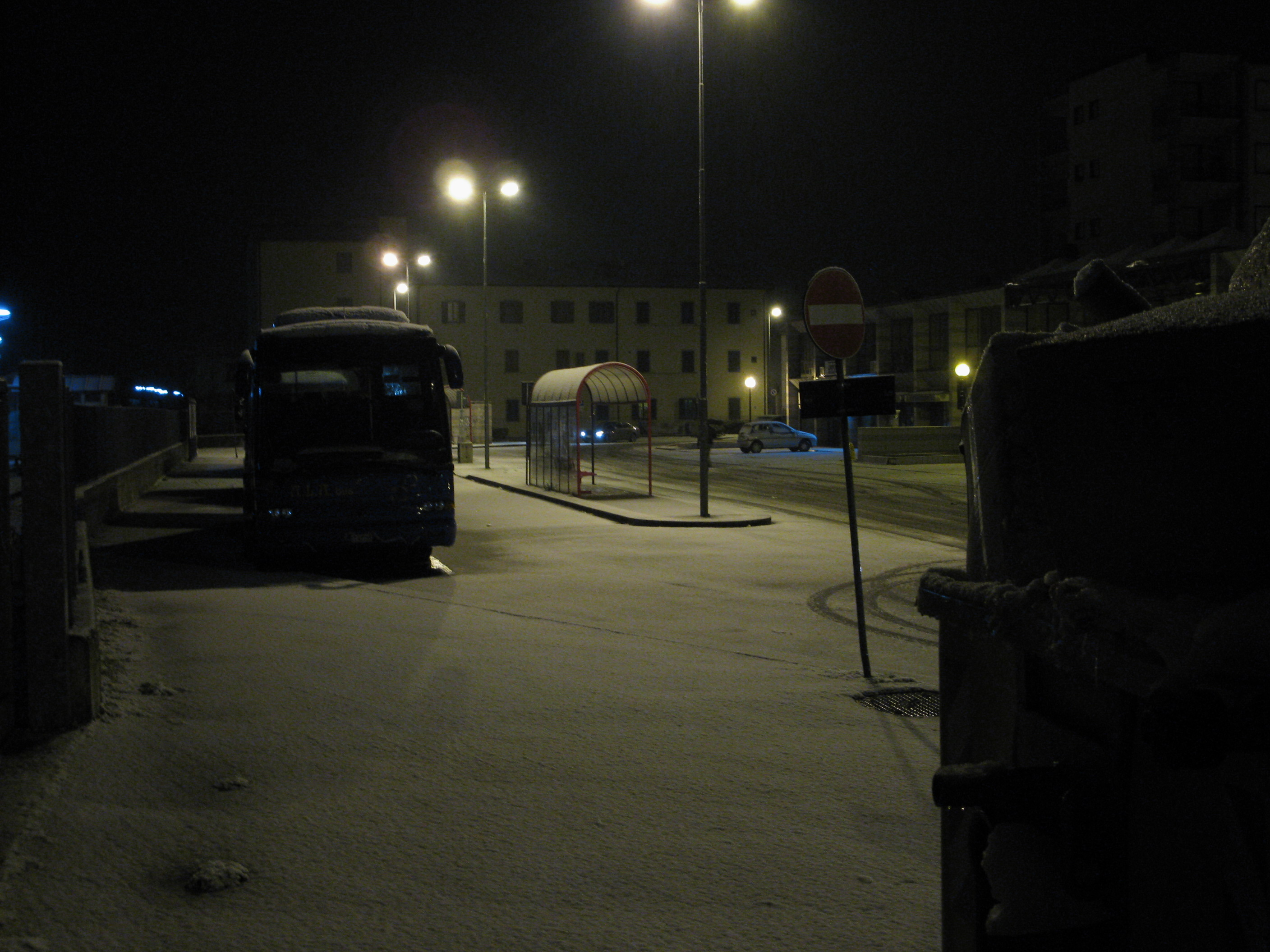
Bus terminal

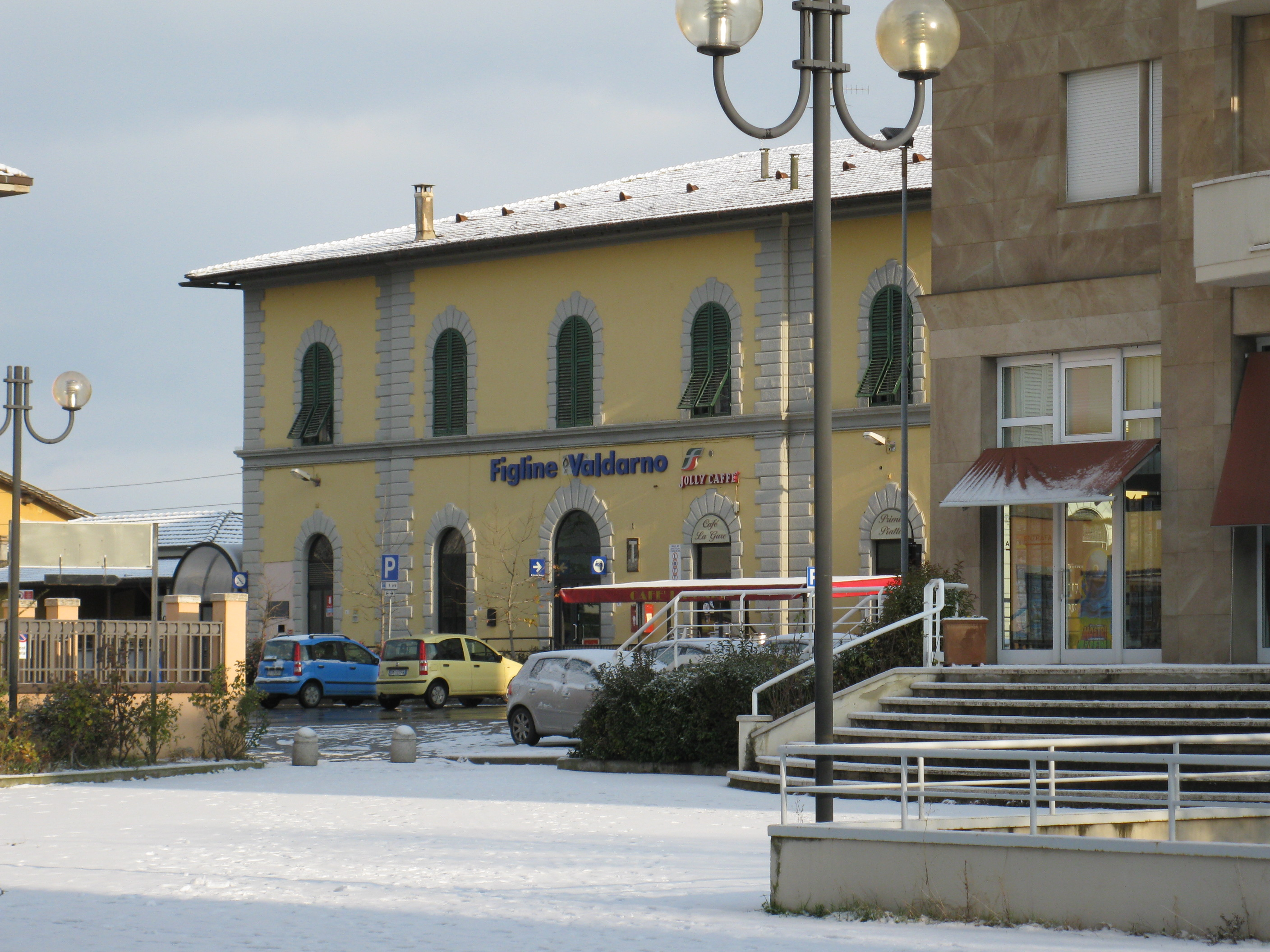
Station building covered by snow

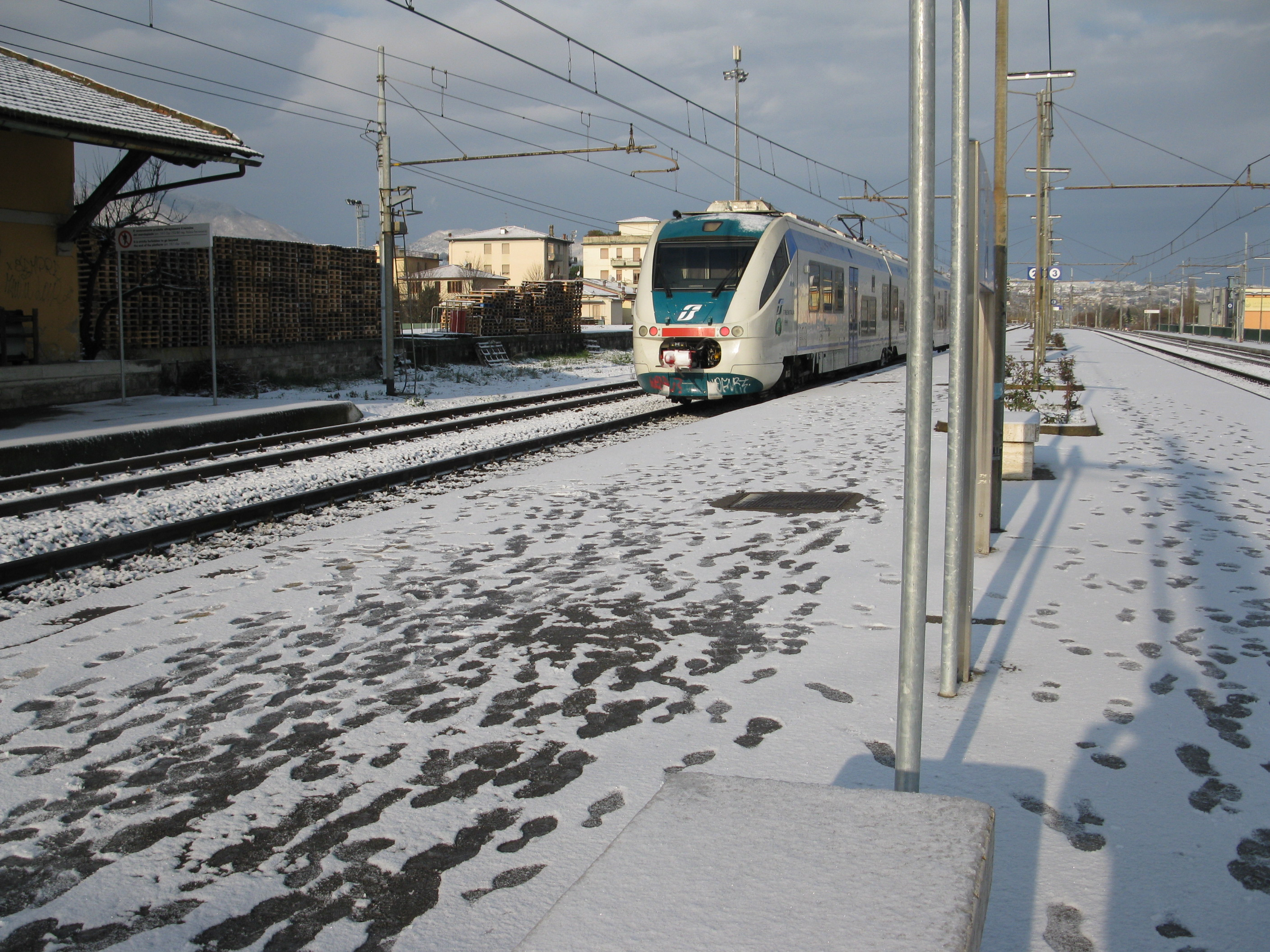
Minuetto train directed to Florence

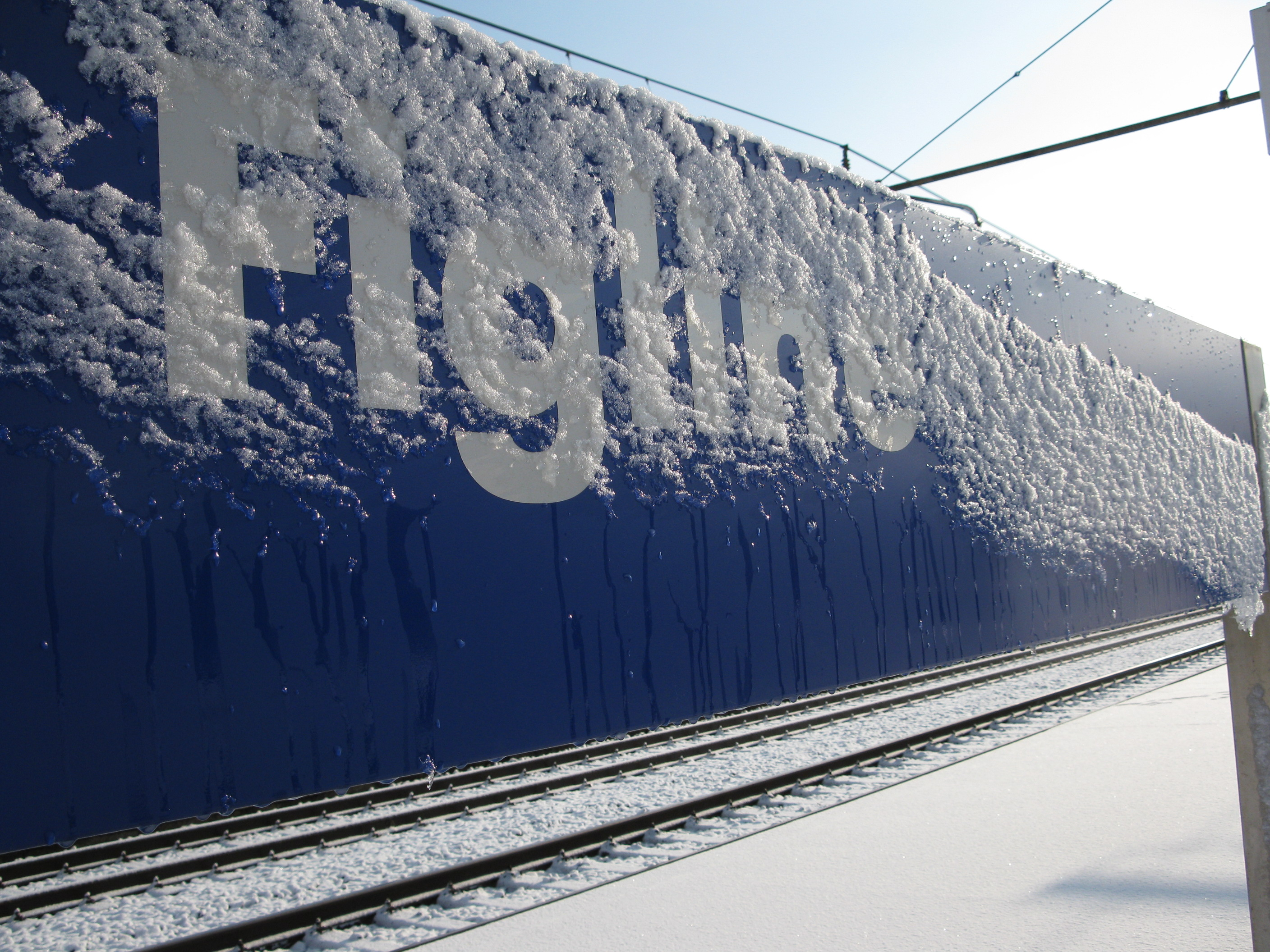
Station sign covered by ice

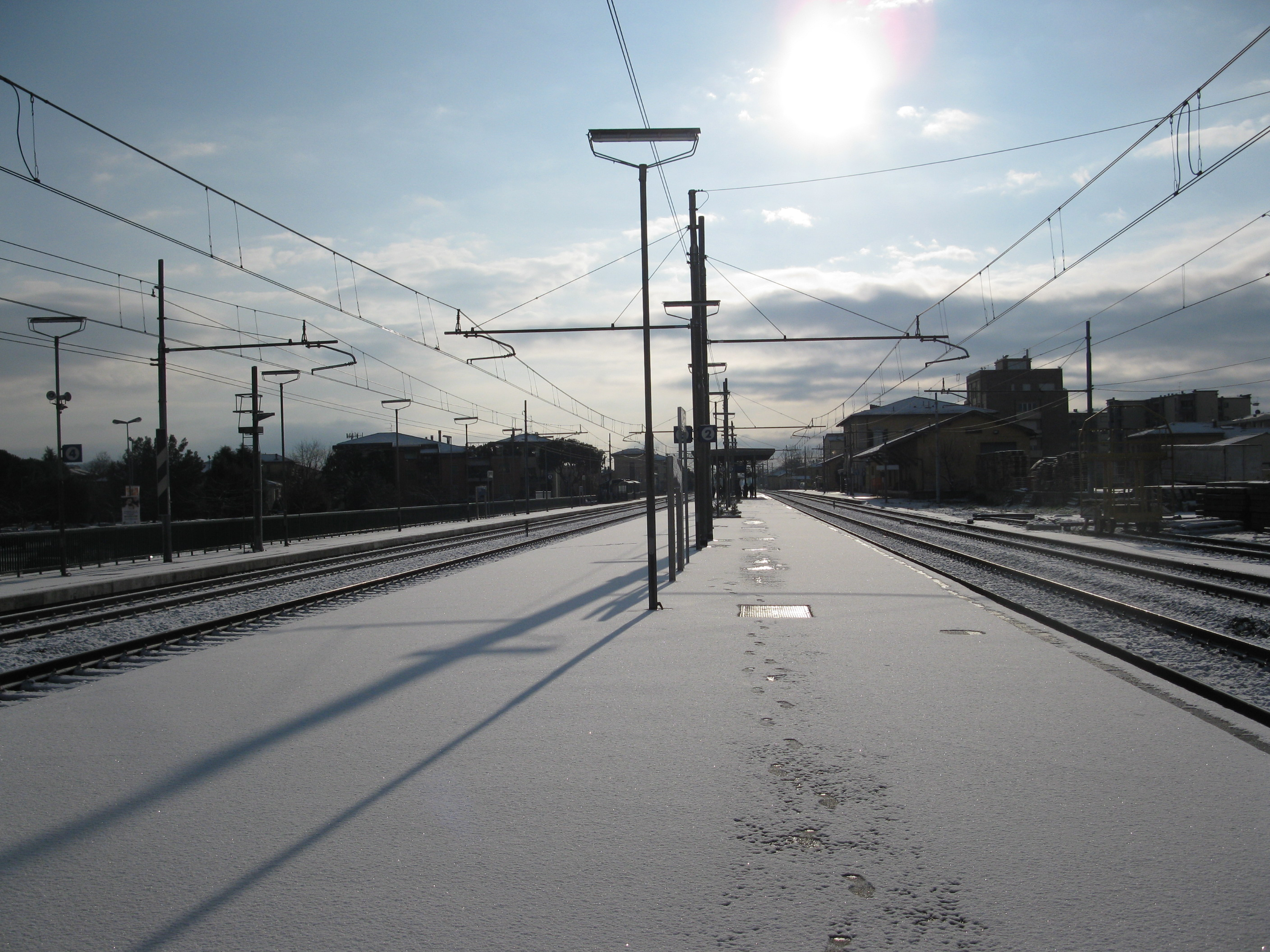
Platform 2/3 covered by snow

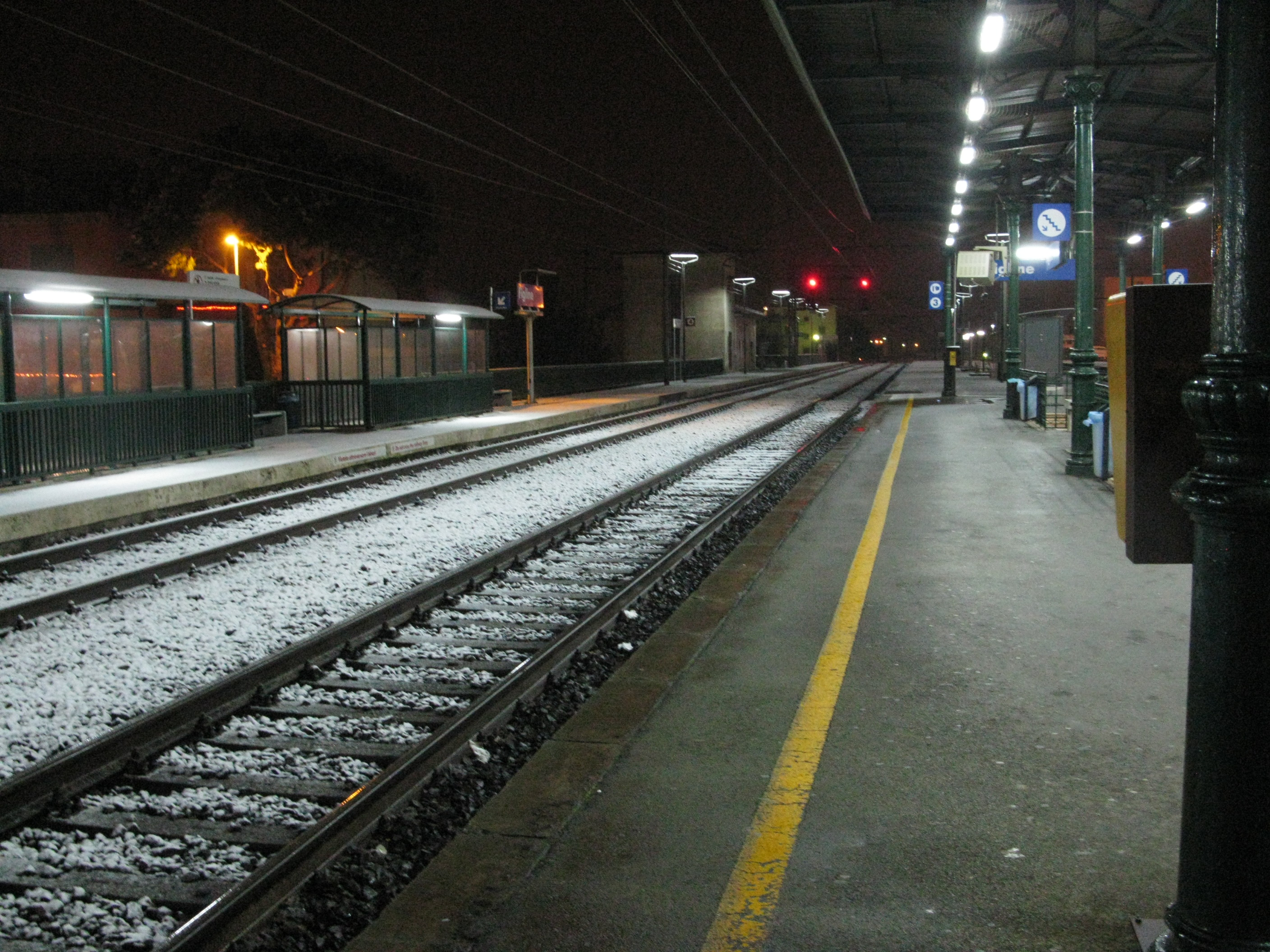
Platform 2/3 by night

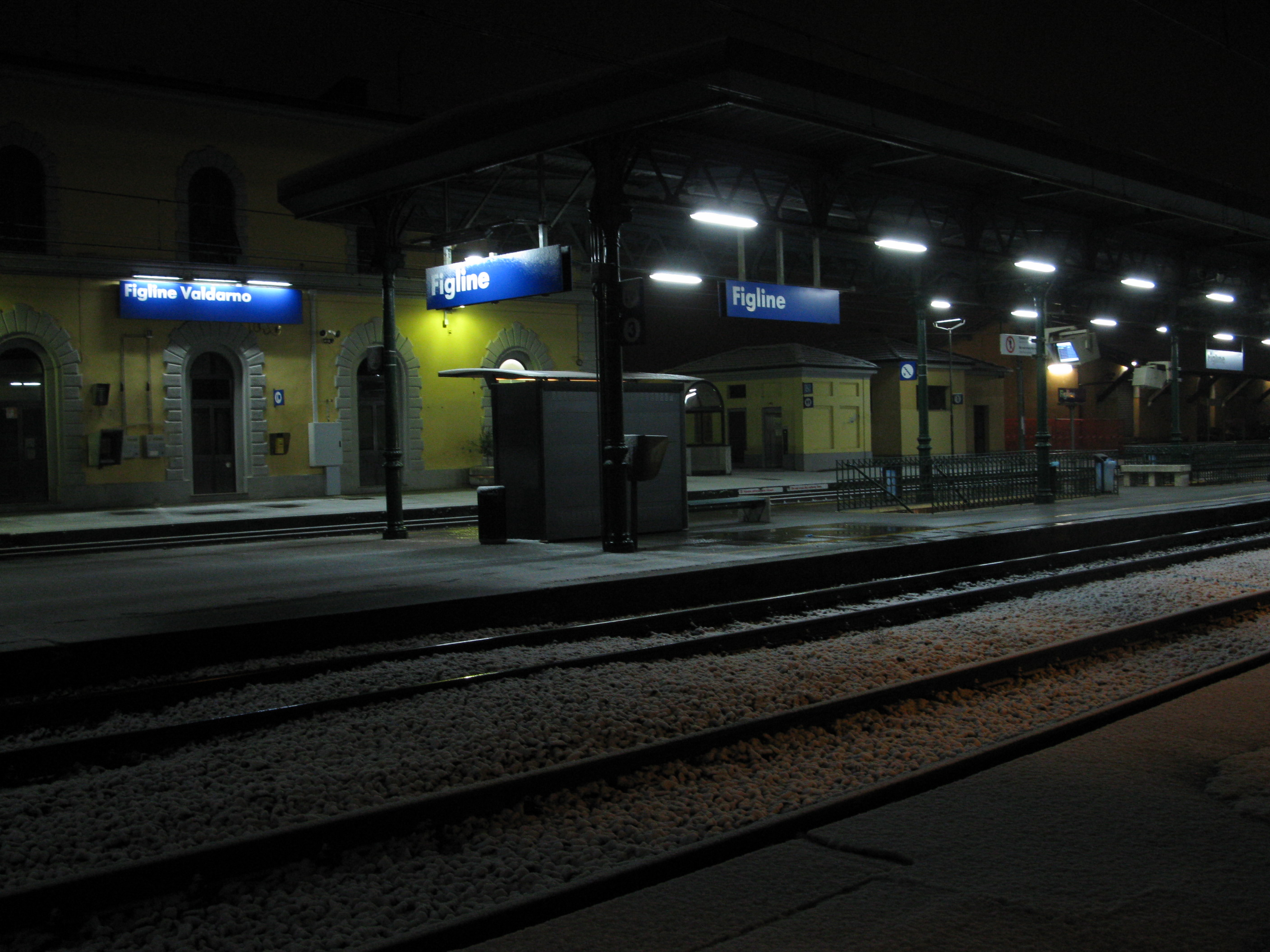
Platform 3 by night

== See also ==
- History of rail transport in Italy
- List of railway stations in Tuscany
- Rail transport in Italy
- Railway stations in Italy
