= Figline Valdarno =

- Frazione
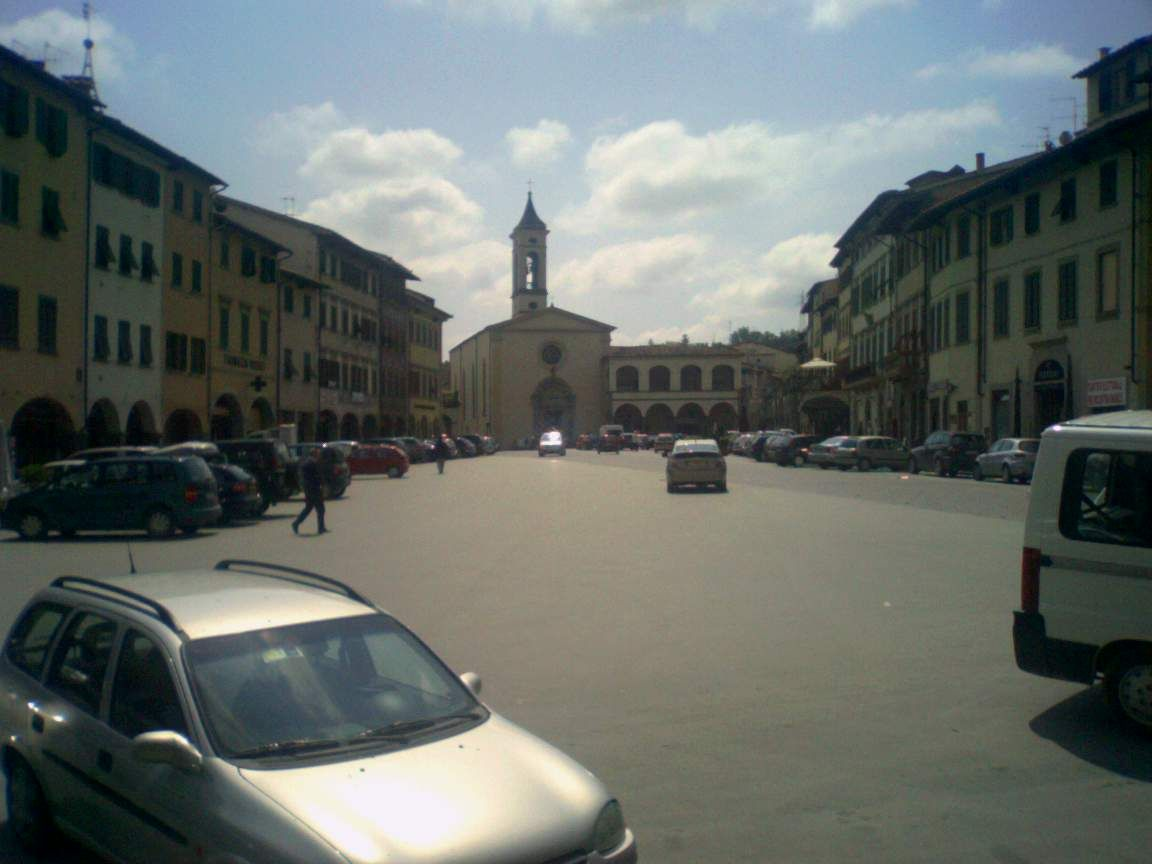

- Location of Figline Valdarno in Italy
- Coordinates: 43°37′N 11°28′E
- Country: Italy
- Region: Tuscany
- Metropolitan city: Florence (FI)
- Comune: Figline e Incisa Valdarno
- Elevation: 126 m (413 ft)

Population (31 December 2013)
  - Total: 17,136
- Demonym: Figlinesi
- Time zone: UTC+1 (CET)
  - Summer (DST): UTC+2 (CEST)
- Postal code: 50063
- Dialing code: 055
- Patron saint: St. Romulus

Figline Valdarno (Italian pronunciation: [fiʎˈʎiːne valˈdarno]) is a frazione in the comune of Figline e Incisa Valdarno in the Metropolitan City of Florence in the Italian region of Tuscany, located about 25 kilometres (16 mi) southeast of Florence. It is the birthplace of Marsilio Ficino.

It was a separate commune until January 1, 2014.

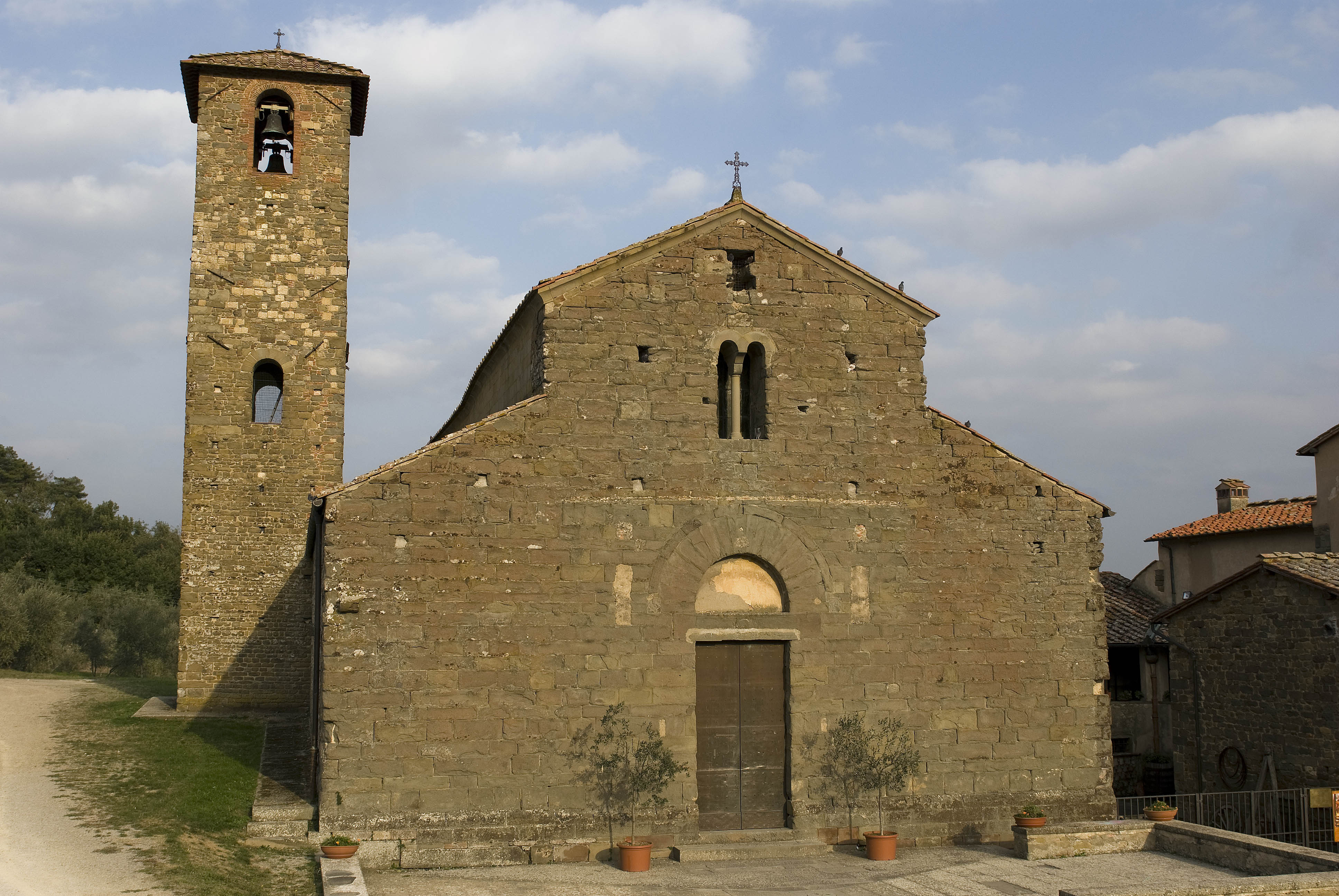
Pieve of San Romolo, at Gaville

== Main sights ==
- Church of San Pietro al Terreno, known from 1148, restored in the 18th century
- Chapel of Villa di San Cerbone, with an Annunciation by Il Cigoli
- Collegiate Church of Santa Maria, with a panel by the Master of Figline (after 1317)
- Convent and Church of St. Francis
- Monastery of Santa Croce
- Pieve of San Romolo at Gaville, Romanesque rural parish church with a rich sculptural decoration
- Abbey of San Cassiano

== Transportation ==
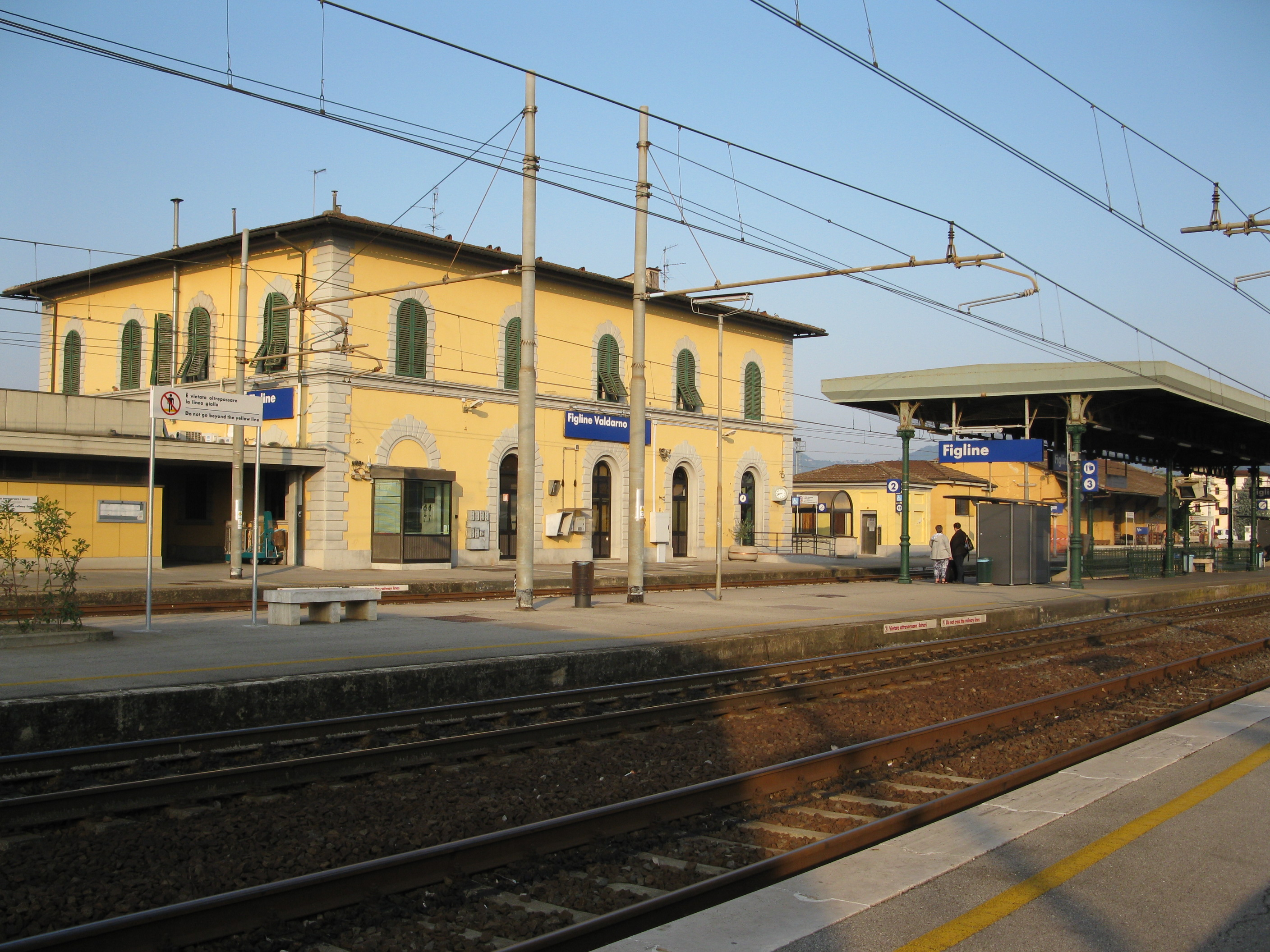
Railway station

The town is served by the station with frequent trains to Florence and Arezzo. Near the station there is a bus terminal that connects Figline with the towns nearby.

== Twin towns ==
- Canals, Valencia, Spain
- Pfungstadt, Germany
