= San Romolo, Gaville =

Church building in Figline e Incisa Valdarno, Italy

Coordinates: 43.5869°N 11.4285°E

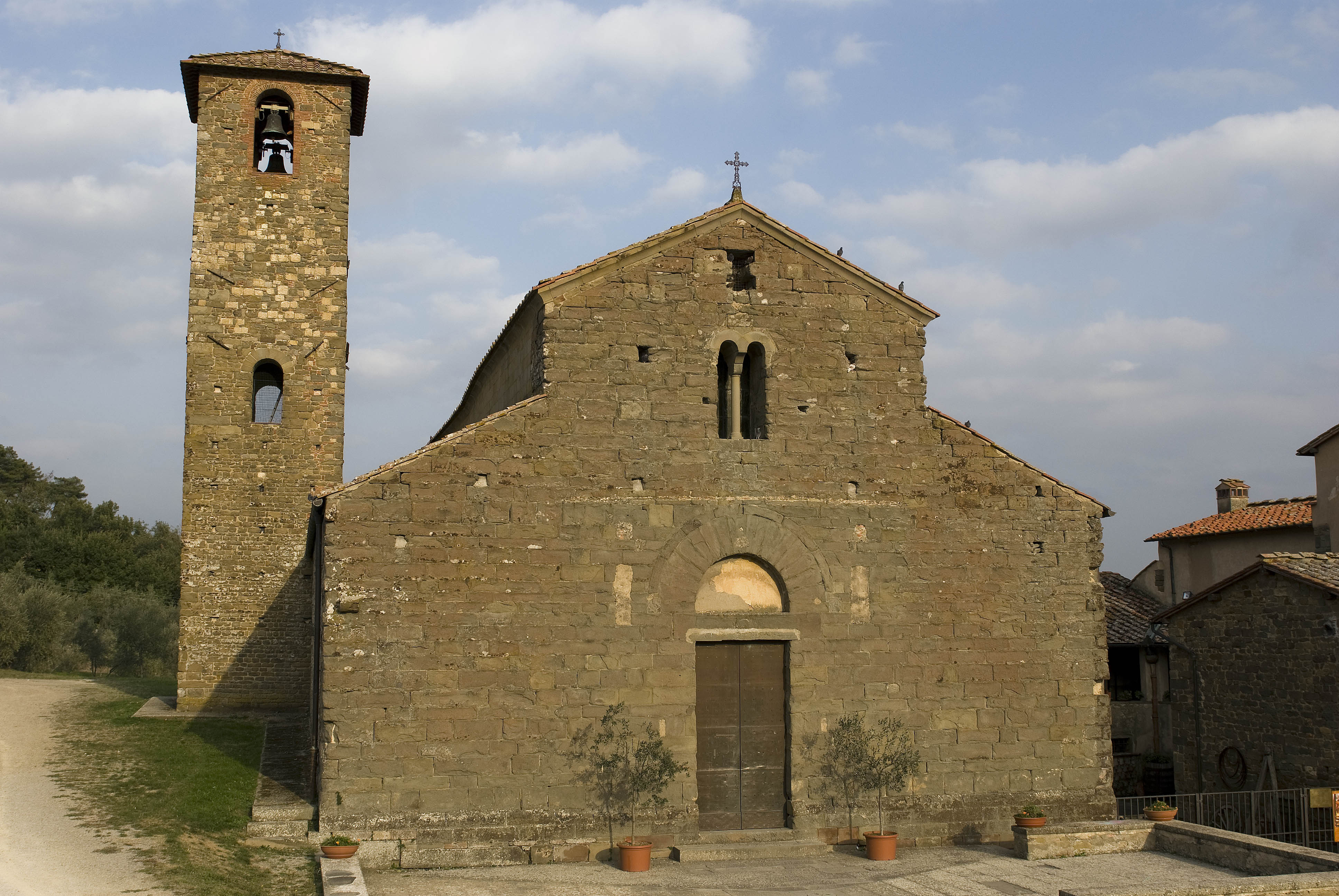
Facade and bell-tower

San Romolo is a Romanesque-style, Roman Catholic pieve or parish church located in the frazione of Gaville, within the town limits of Figline Valdarno, region of Tuscany, Italy.

This church was originally erected between 1007 and 1070, and was encompassed by walls of a castle of the Ubertini family. The church is dedicated to St Romulus. The church had a major refurbishment in the 18th century, but subsequent attention attempted to restore it to the original Romanesque core. The building was heavily damaged during World War II, and restored from 1947 t0 1968 using mainly the original stone.

The interior columns of the church have Romanesque capitals. In the left nave, is a fresco depicting the Annunciation by the studio of Ghirlandaio while on the right the frescoe once in the lunette of the facade is attributed to 15th century Sienese painters.
