= San Giovanni Valdarno railway station =

Railway station in Italy

San Giovanni Valdarno
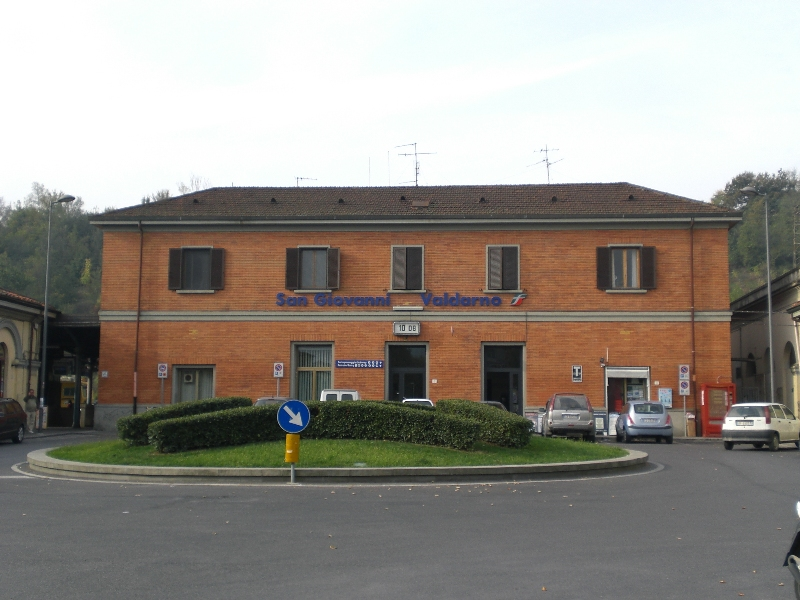

General information
- Location: Piazza Matteotti 49; 52027 San Giovanni Valdarno AR; San Giovanni Valdarno, Arezzo, Tuscany; Italy
- Coordinates: 43°33′58″N 11°31′39″E
- Operator: Rete Ferroviaria Italiana
- Line: Firenze–Roma
- Distance: 47.23 km (29.35 mi) from Firenze Santa Maria Novella
- Platforms: 4
- Train operators: Trenitalia
- Connections: Interurban buses

Other information
- Classification: Silver

History
- Opened: 5 April 1863; 163 years ago
Location
- Location within Tuscany Location within Italy

San Giovanni Valdarno railway station (Italian: Stazione di San Giovanni Valdarno) is situated on the Florence–Rome railway line, 50 km from Florence, on the section between Florence and Arezzo.

The station is situated near the connection with the "direttissima" (high speed track). One train an hour passes on the direttissima without stopping. It arrives in Florence in 20 minutes. The other trains pass from the slow line via Pontassieve.

The freight yard is used quite frequently because nearby the station there is a large still mill.

All regional trains stop at the station.

The station has one automatic ticket machine. The ticket office is open from 6:30 am to 7:30 pm. The station also has a waiting room.

There are many monitors (two in the station, two for the platforms 2 and 3) displaying train departures and arrivals.

The station has about 2118 passenger movements daily, or 0.773 million annually. Approximately 140 trains call here daily in each direction. Each hour 4 trains go both southbound and northbound. The first train arrives at 5:07 in the morning and the last one leaves the station at 00:03.

Outside the station there is also a taxi service with numbers displayed on posters outside the station.

== Station layout ==
The station has two platforms with station-roofs, connected by a subway. Platform 1 is used for trains going to Montevarchi, Arezzo, Chiusi, Foligno and Rome . The trains going to Florence use platform 2 while platform 3 is used interchange. The line on which the station is situated is electrified.

Tracks
1	■Florence-Rome railway	Montevarchi, Arezzo, Chiusi, Foligno and Rome
2	■Florence-Rome railway	To Florence, Prato, Pistoia
3	■Florence-Rome railway	Used for train interchange

== History ==
The station was opened in 1863 by the Roman Railway Company with the opening of the Pontassieve-Montevarchi was extended a few months later to Terontola. The main building was destroyed by an air raid in the Second World War and was reconstructed in second half of the 20th century.

== Bus terminal ==
Near the station (in front of a COOP supermarket), there is a bus terminal. It is used to connect towns unreachable by rail. The service is operated by Etruria Mobilità for the Province of Arezzo (Pian di Scò, Castelfranco di Sopra, Loro Ciuffenna and Terranuova Bracciolini.

== See also ==
- History of rail transport in Italy
- List of railway stations in Tuscany
- Rail transport in Italy
- Railway stations in Italy
