= Arezzo railway station =

Railway station in Tuscany, Italy

Arezzo
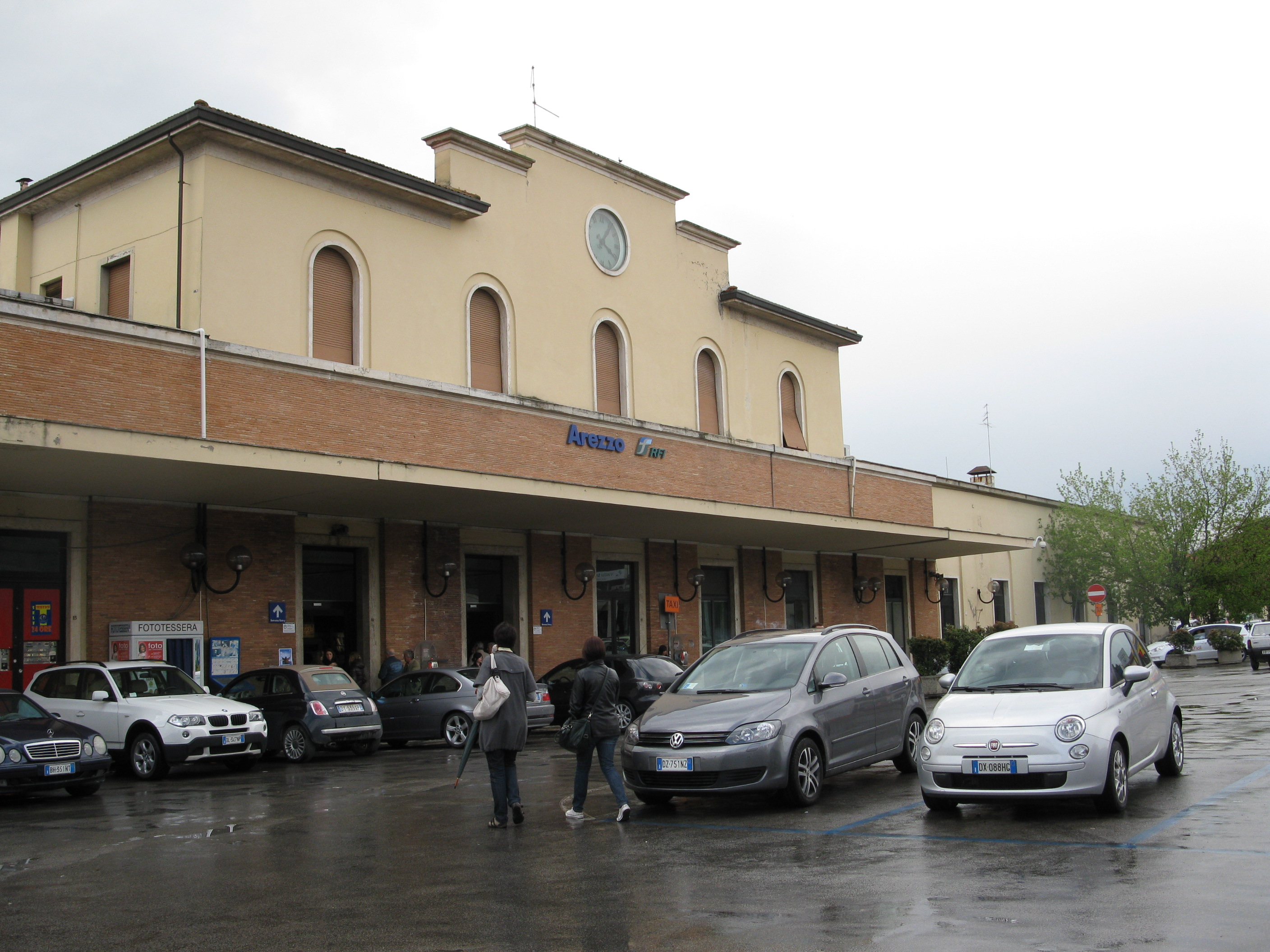
- View of the passenger building.

General information
- Location: Piazza della Repubblica; 52100 Arezzo AR; Arezzo, Arezzo, Tuscany; Italy
- Coordinates: 43°27′40″N 11°52′32″E
- Operator: Rete Ferroviaria Italiana; Centostazioni
- Lines: Firenze–Roma; Arezzo–Stia (LFI); Arezzo–Sinalunga (LFI); Arezzo–Fossato di Vico (1886-1945)
- Distance: 227.370 km (141.281 mi) from Roma Termini
- Platforms: 7
- Train operators: Trenitalia
- Connections: Urban Interurban buses

Other information
- Classification: Gold

History
- Opened: 16 April 1866; 160 years ago
Location
- Location within Tuscany Location within Italy

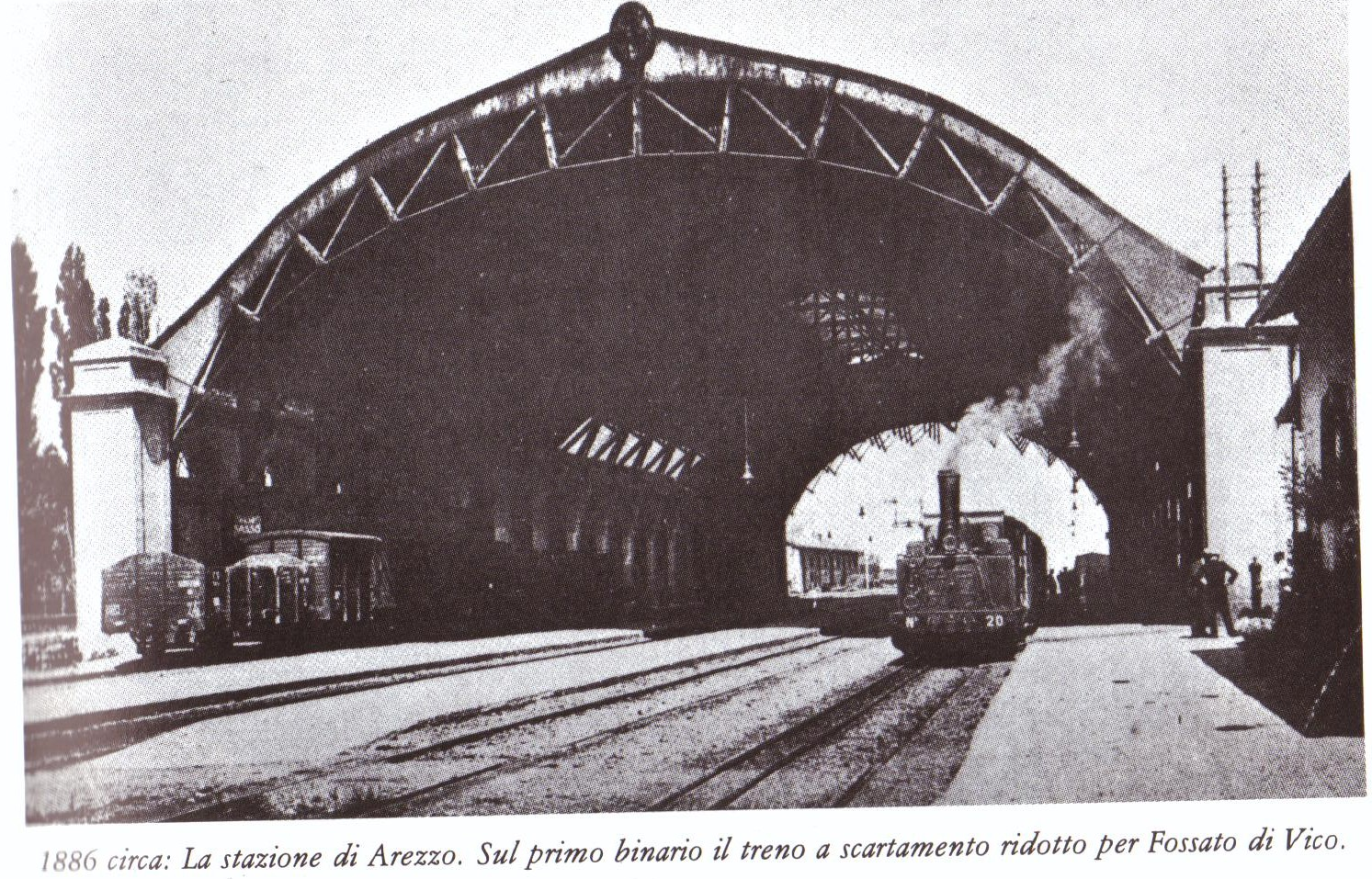
The station in 1886, a few years after the opening with a train leaving for Fossato di Vico.

Arezzo railway station serves the city of Arezzo in Tuscany, Italy. This station is the most important in all the province.

== Overview ==
There is a large operational freight yard.

Arezzo is part of the Centostazioni network which includes the hundred most important stations in Italy.

Two railway companies serve Arezzo:

- Trenitalia (Ferrovie dello Stato group) operates the majority of trains. It provides services to the Valdarno, Valtiberina, Rome, Florence, Milan, Naples.
- La Ferroviaria Italiana (LFI) operates only trains to Stia and Sinalunga.

Arezzo station is near to the interconnections (Arezzo Nord and Arezzo Sud) with the "direttissima" high speed line. This provides connections to Florence in less than 40 minutes covering a distance of 88 kilometres.

This station is part of the "Memorario" project which provides a regular timetable.

Arezzo has 1.126 million passenger movements annually. The following trains stop every day in Arezzo:

- 126 regional trains
- 19 InterCity trains
- 2 Frecciarossa trains

The station has a CCTV surveillance on all platforms and in the subway.

All platforms, except for platform 6, are connected by a subway and lifts.

The first platform of the station was originally three rails, to allow the transit of narrow-gauge trains to Fossato di Vico.

== Station layout ==
This station has seven platforms. Only platforms 1 North (service to Stia) and 6 (service to Sinalunga) are dedicated to LFI trains. All the other platforms are used for Trenitalia services.

Tracks
1N	■Arezzo-Stia railway line	To Stia
1	■Florence-Rome railway line	To Florence
2	■Florence-Rome railway line	To Florence
3	■Florence-Rome railway line	To Foligno, Rome, Naples.
4	■Florence-Rome railway line	To Florence, Milan.
5	■Florence-Rome railway line	Used for train interchange.
6	■Arezzo-Sinalunga railway line	To Sinalunga.

== Adjacent stations ==
Previous	Line	Next
Chiusi	Florence–Rome high-speed railway line (direttissima: high speed line)	Firenze Campo di Marte
Castiglion fiorentino	Florence-Rome railway line (fast and semi-fast regional trains passing through the low speed line)	Montevarchi
Castiglion fiorentino	Florence-Rome railway line (metropolitan trains passing through the low speed line)	Ponticino
Terminus	Arezzo-Stia railway line(LFI service)	Giovi
Terminus	Arezzo-Sinalunga railway line(LFI service)	Arezzo Pescaiola

== See also ==
- History of rail transport in Italy
- List of railway stations in Tuscany
- Rail transport in Italy
- Railway stations in Italy
