= List of municipalities of the Province of Arezzo =

The following is a list of the 36 municipalities (comuni) of the Province of Arezzo in the region of Tuscany in Italy.

== List ==
Municipality	Population (2026)	Area (km²)	Density
Anghiari	5,343	130.92	40.8
Arezzo	96,506	384.70	250.9
Badia Tedalda	941	118.72	7.9
Bibbiena	11,971	86.51	138.4
Bucine	9,906	131.47	75.3
Capolona	5,203	47.56	109.4
Caprese Michelangelo	1,325	66.53	19.9
Castel Focognano	2,931	56.63	51.8
Castel San Niccolò	2,493	83.27	29.9
Castelfranco Piandiscò	9,808	55.96	175.3
Castiglion Fibocchi	2,122	25.46	83.3
Castiglion Fiorentino	12,823	111.58	114.9
Cavriglia	9,504	60.87	156.1
Chitignano	872	14.89	58.6
Chiusi della Verna	1,892	102.33	18.5
Civitella in Val di Chiana	8,608	100.19	85.9
Cortona	20,725	342.97	60.4
Foiano della Chiana	9,026	40.77	221.4
Laterina Pergine Valdarno	6,291	70.57	89.1
Loro Ciuffenna	5,874	86.52	67.9
Lucignano	3,394	44.81	75.7
Marciano della Chiana	3,517	23.75	148.1
Monte San Savino	8,588	89.87	95.6
Montemignaio	495	25.94	19.1
Monterchi	1,719	29.42	58.4
Montevarchi	24,044	56.67	424.3
Ortignano Raggiolo	834	36.30	23.0
Pieve Santo Stefano	2,966	156.10	19.0
Poppi	5,732	97.09	59.0
Pratovecchio Stia	5,406	138.24	39.1
San Giovanni Valdarno	16,564	21.45	772.2
Sansepolcro	15,192	91.19	166.6
Sestino	1,150	80.22	14.3
Subbiano	6,405	77.84	82.3
Talla	964	59.89	16.1
Terranuova Bracciolini	12,135	85.88	141.3

== See also ==
- List of municipalities of Tuscany
- List of municipalities of Italy
