= Casentino =

Valley in Italy

Coordinates: 43°42′N 11°49′E

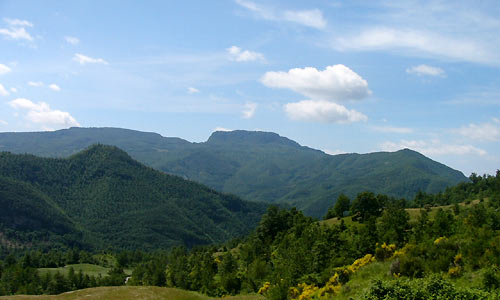
View of the Foreste Casentinesi, Monte Falterona, Campigna National Park

The Casentino is the valley in which the first tract of the river Arno flows to Subbiano, Italy.

It is one of the four valleys (alongside Valdarno, Valdichiana, and Valtiberina) in which the Province of Arezzo is divided.

== Geography ==
Mount Falterona, from which the Arno starts, represents the northern boundary between the Casentino and Romagna. On the east of the valley are the Alpe di Serra and the Alpe di Catenaia, which separate the Casentino from the highest tract of the Valtiberina. On the west there is the Pratomagno, which separates the valley from the Valdarno Superiore. Part of the valley is included in the Foreste Casentinesi, Monte Falterona, Campigna National Park.

The valley has an oval form, with an extension across the river that varies from a maximum of 60 km (40 miles) to a minimum of 30 km (20 miles). The topography of the Casentino is especially various, including both plains and mountains rich in large forests. These mountains have often attracted great saints: it was here that St. Romuald built his hermitages at Camaldoli, and that less than two centuries later St. Francis of Assisi established the Sanctuary of La Verna, the headquarters of the Franciscan order. The valley is divided by the locals into the Alto Casentino (which includes the municipalities of Pratovecchio Stia, Montemignaio, Castel San Niccolò, and Poppi) and consequently in the Basso Casentino as well. While theoretically encompassing all remaining municipalities—with the possible exception of Chiusi della Verna—this designation is rarely used in practice, unlike the former. Instead, each remaining municipality is treated as a standalone entity, save for the conurbation of Capolona and Subbiano, historic arch-rivals.

Most of the valley's main towns are all located nearby the Arno: among these the most important are Bibbiena, Pratovecchio and Stia, Capolona, Subbiano, Rassina, and Poppi. The villages located on the neighbouring hills and mountains are much smaller. These are Chitignano, Chiusi della Verna, Montemignaio, Ortignano Raggiolo and Talla.

== History ==
Historically, the valley's trajectory was shaped by both its proximity to major urban centers like Florence and Arezzo and feudal rule. The nearest major city, Arezzo, traces its origins to the Etruscan era. Throughout virtually the entire Middle Ages, the Casentino was dominated by the Guidi family—known as the Conti Guidi—whose various branches held sway over distinct castles across the Upper Casentino. The most important of the branches of the Guidi family were the Guidi of Poppi, the Guidi of Romena and the Guidi of Porciano. Although their governance styles differed radically from one stronghold to another, all exercised a degree of despotic authority over the local peasant population.

The primary antagonist to the Conti Guidi (particularly the branch in Poppi) and to the Alto Casentino as a whole was Bibbiena. Unlike its neighbors, Bibbiena was a fortified town (borgo fortificato) without a central castle or a ruling noble lineage, and was historically aligned with Arezzo. This political divide laid the groundwork for a long-standing local rivalry (campanilismo) between the towns that persists to this day.

The Casentino is mentioned extensively in the Divine Comedy by Dante Alighieri and in the song "Ich hab in Penna einen Liebsten wohnen", from the Italieniches Liederbuch by Hugo Wolf.

== See also ==
- Etruscan civilization
- Conti Guidi
