= Pieve Santo Stefano =

- Comune
- Comune di Pieve Santo Stefano
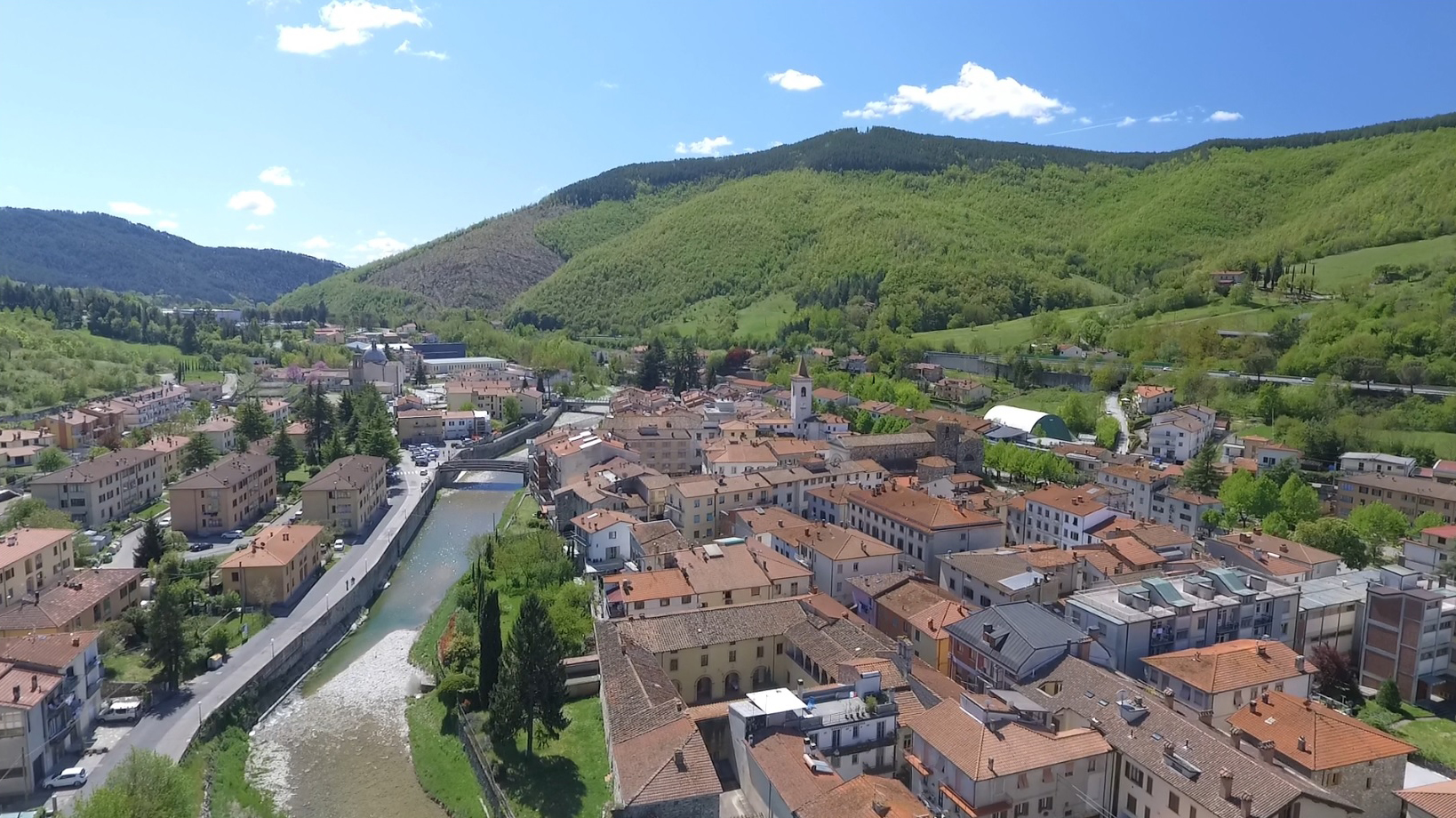
- View of Pieve Santo Stefano

- Coat of arms

- Location within Italy Location within Tuscany
- Coordinates: 43°40′N 12°3′E
- Country: Italy
- Region: Tuscany
- Province: Arezzo (AR)

Government
  - Mayor: Albano Bragagni

Area
  - Total: 155.7 km^{2} (60.1 sq mi)
- Elevation: 431 m (1,414 ft)

Population (31 December 2010)
  - Total: 3,249
  - Density: 20.87/km^{2} (54.05/sq mi)
- Demonym: Pievani
- Time zone: UTC+1 (CET)
  - Summer (DST): UTC+2 (CEST)
- Postal code: 52036
- Dialing code: 0575
- Website: Official website

Pieve Santo Stefano is a comune (municipality) in the Province of Arezzo in the Italian region Tuscany, located in the Valtiberina about 70 kilometres (43 mi) east of Florence and about 25 kilometres (16 mi) northeast of Arezzo.

Pieve Santo Stefano borders the following municipalities: Anghiari, Badia Tedalda, Caprese Michelangelo, Chiusi della Verna, Sansepolcro, Verghereto.

== Main sights ==
- Hermitage of Madonna del Faggio, located in Cercetole. It was built in the 15th century at the place where, according to tradition, the Virgin appeared to a shepherd in 1400.
