= Chiusi della Verna =

- Comune
- Comune di Chiusi della Verna
- Coat of arms

- Location within Italy Location within Tuscany
- Coordinates: 43°42′N 11°56′E
- Country: Italy
- Region: Tuscany
- Province: Arezzo (AR)
- Frazioni: La Beccia, La Verna, Biforco, Compito, Corezzo, Corsalone, Dama, Case Nuove, Frassineta, Giampereta, La Rocca, Rimbocchi, Sarna, Val della Meta, Vallebona, Vezzano

Government
  - Mayor: Umberto Betti

Area
  - Total: 102.5 km^{2} (39.6 sq mi)
- Elevation: 960 m (3,150 ft)

Population (Dec. 2004)
  - Total: 2,240
  - Density: 21.9/km^{2} (56.6/sq mi)
- Demonym: Chiusini
- Time zone: UTC+1 (CET)
  - Summer (DST): UTC+2 (CEST)
- Postal code: 52010
- Dialing code: 0575
- Patron saint: St. Francis
- Saint day: October 4
- Website: Official website

Chiusi della Verna is a comune (municipality) in the Province of Arezzo in the Italian region Tuscany, located about 60 kilometres (37 mi) east of Florence and about 25 kilometres (16 mi) north of Arezzo. It is in the Casentino traditional region.

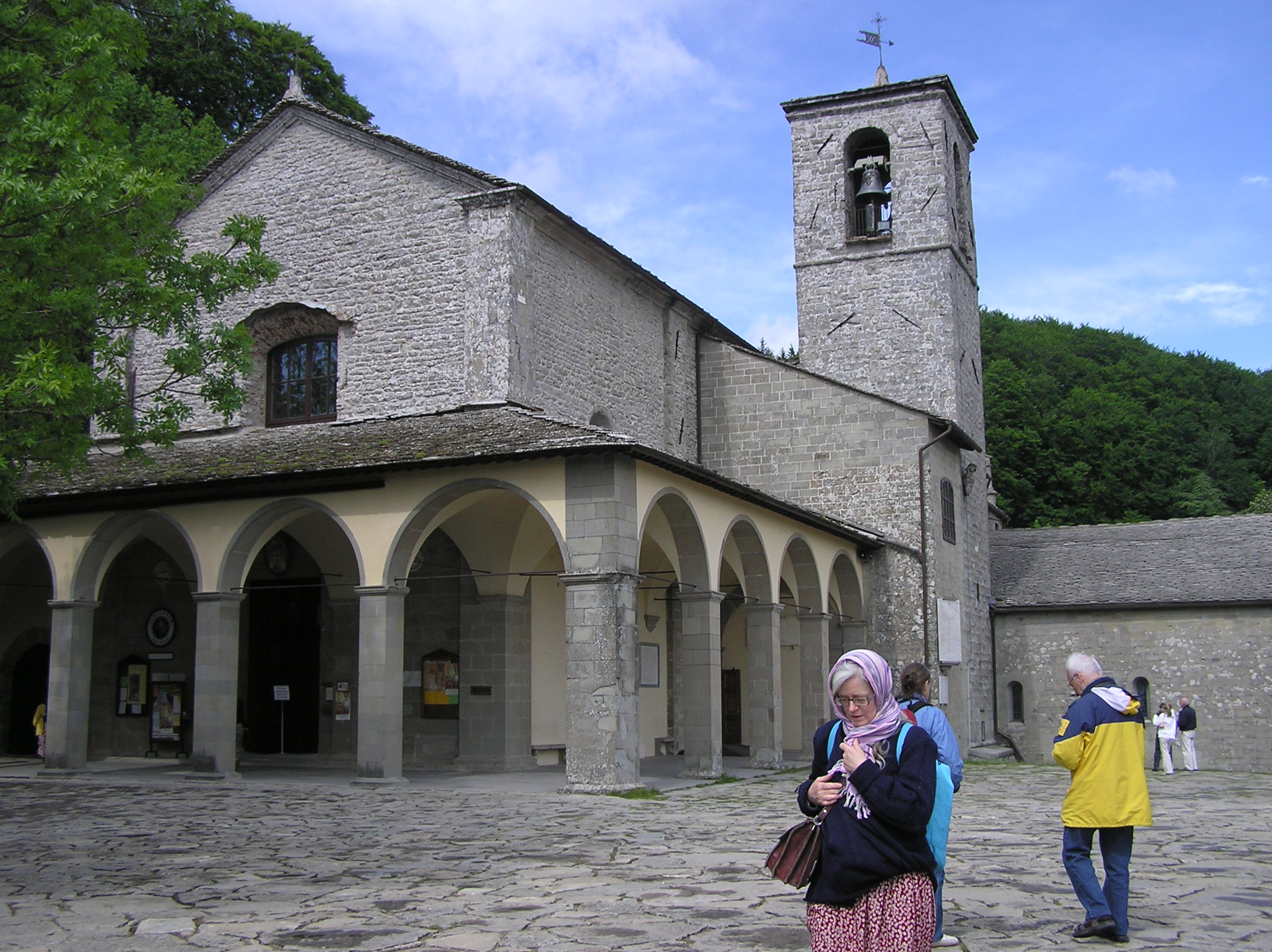
Sanctuary of St. Francis

Chiusi della Verna borders the following municipalities: Bagno di Romagna, Bibbiena, Caprese Michelangelo, Castel Focognano, Chitignano, Pieve Santo Stefano, Poppi, Subbiano, Verghereto.

In the frazione La Verna is the famous Sanctuary of St. Francis.

== Demographics ==
Historical population

Year	Pop.	±%
1861	2,529	—
1871	2,718	+7.5%
1881	2,843	+4.6%
1901	3,382	+19.0%
1911	3,746	+10.8%

Year	Pop.	±%
1921	3,795	+1.3%
1931	3,939	+3.8%
1936	4,048	+2.8%
1951	4,018	−0.7%
1961	3,103	−22.8%

Year	Pop.	±%
1971	2,424	−21.9%
1981	2,292	−5.4%
1991	2,223	−3.0%
2001	2,225	+0.1%

Source: Data from ISTAT

== International relations ==
Chiusi della Verna is twinned with:

- Helmstadt, Germany
- Serravalle, San Marino (1954)
