= Loro Ciuffenna =

- Comune
- Comune di Loro Ciuffenna
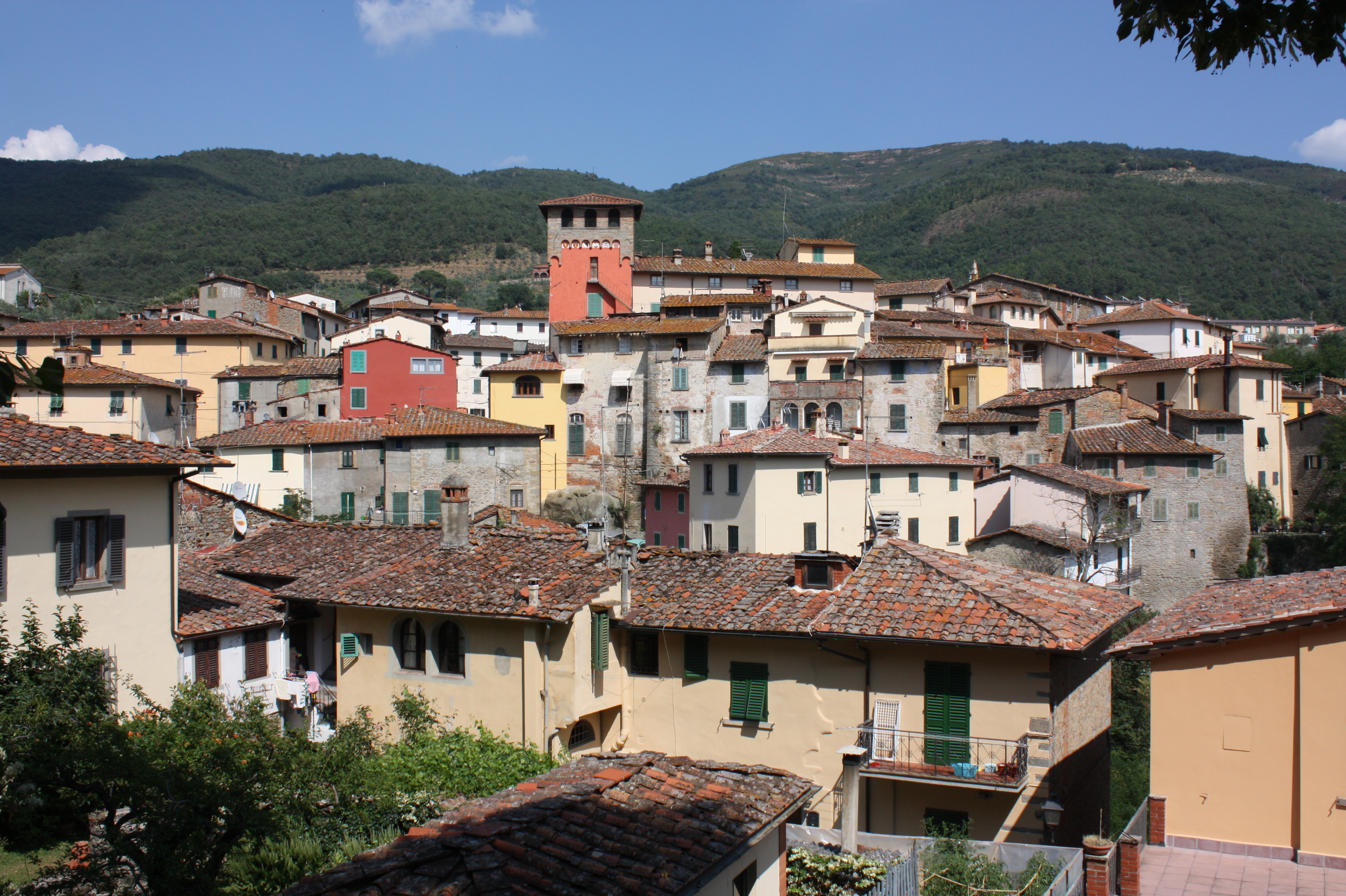
- View of Loro Ciuffenna

- Coat of arms

- Location within Italy Location within Tuscany
- Coordinates: 43°35′N 11°37′E
- Country: Italy
- Region: Tuscany
- Province: Arezzo (AR)
- Frazioni: Anciolina, Casale, Chiassaia, Faeto, Pratovalle, Casamona, Gropina, Il Borro, La Villa Malva, Modine, Gorgiti, Poggio di Loro, Querceto, Rocca Ricciarda, Roveraia, San Clemente in Valle, San Giustino Valdarno, Trappola, Trevane

Government
  - Mayor: Andrea Rossi

Area
  - Total: 86.52 km^{2} (33.41 sq mi)
- Elevation: 330 m (1,080 ft)

Population (1 January 2025)
  - Total: 5,923
  - Density: 68.46/km^{2} (177.3/sq mi)
- Demonym: Loresi
- Time zone: UTC+1 (CET)
  - Summer (DST): UTC+2 (CEST)
- Postal code: 52024
- Dialing code: 055
- Website: Official website

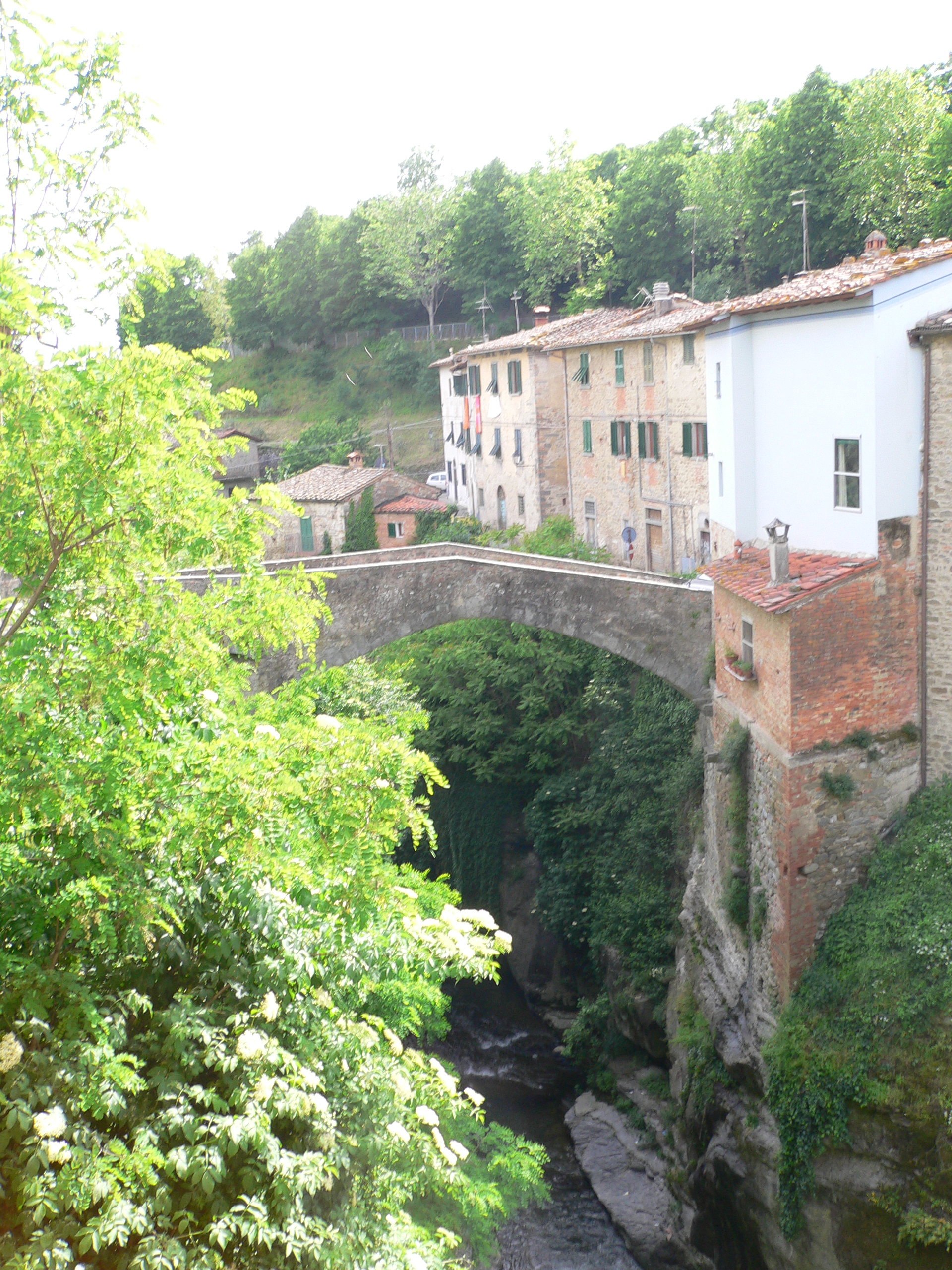
Bridge in the village of Loro Ciuffenna.

Loro Ciuffenna is a comune (municipality) in the Province of Arezzo in the Italian region Tuscany, located about 40 kilometres (25 mi) southeast of Florence and about 25 kilometres (16 mi) northwest of Arezzo.

Loro Ciuffenna borders the following municipalities: Castel Focognano, Castel San Niccolò, Castelfranco Piandiscò, Castiglion Fibocchi, Ortignano Raggiolo, Talla, and Terranuova Bracciolini. It is one of I Borghi più belli d'Italia ("The most beautiful villages of Italy").

== Sister cities ==
- Gruissan, France
- (Western Sahara) Tifariti, Sahrawi Arab Democratic Republic
