= Castiglion Fibocchi =

- Comune
- Comune di Castiglion Fibocchi
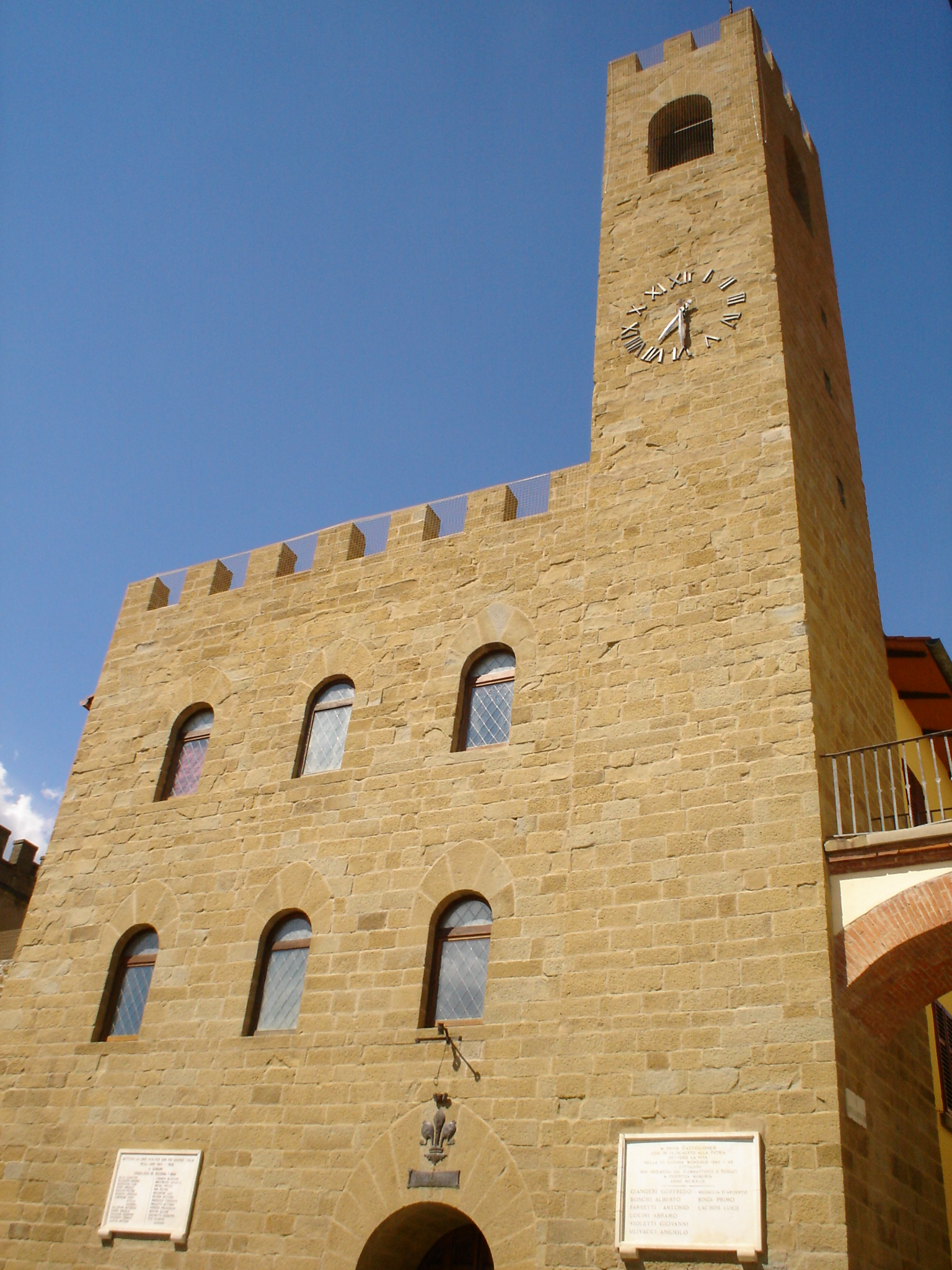
- View of Castiglion Fibocchi

- Coat of arms

- Location within Italy Location within Tuscany
- Coordinates: 43°32′N 11°46′E
- Country: Italy
- Region: Tuscany
- Province: Arezzo (AR)
- Frazioni: Gello Biscardo

Government
  - Mayor: Salvatore Montanaro

Area
  - Total: 25.7 km^{2} (9.9 sq mi)
- Elevation: 300 m (980 ft)

Population (31 August 2007)
  - Total: 2,110
  - Density: 82.1/km^{2} (213/sq mi)
- Demonym: Castiglionesi
- Time zone: UTC+1 (CET)
  - Summer (DST): UTC+2 (CEST)
- Postal code: 52029
- Dialing code: 0575

Castiglion Fibocchi (Italian pronunciation: [kastiʎˈʎoɱ fiˈbokki]) is a comune (municipality) in the Province of Arezzo in the Italian region Tuscany, located about 50 kilometres (31 mi) southeast of Florence and about 12 kilometres (7 mi) northwest of Arezzo.

Castiglion Fibocchi borders the following municipalities: Arezzo, Capolona, Laterina Pergine Valdarno, Loro Ciuffenna, Talla, Terranuova Bracciolini.

== Sister cities ==
- Veurey-Voroize, France, since 1991.
