= Valdarno =

Valley of the river Arno

Coordinates: 43°34′N 11°32′E

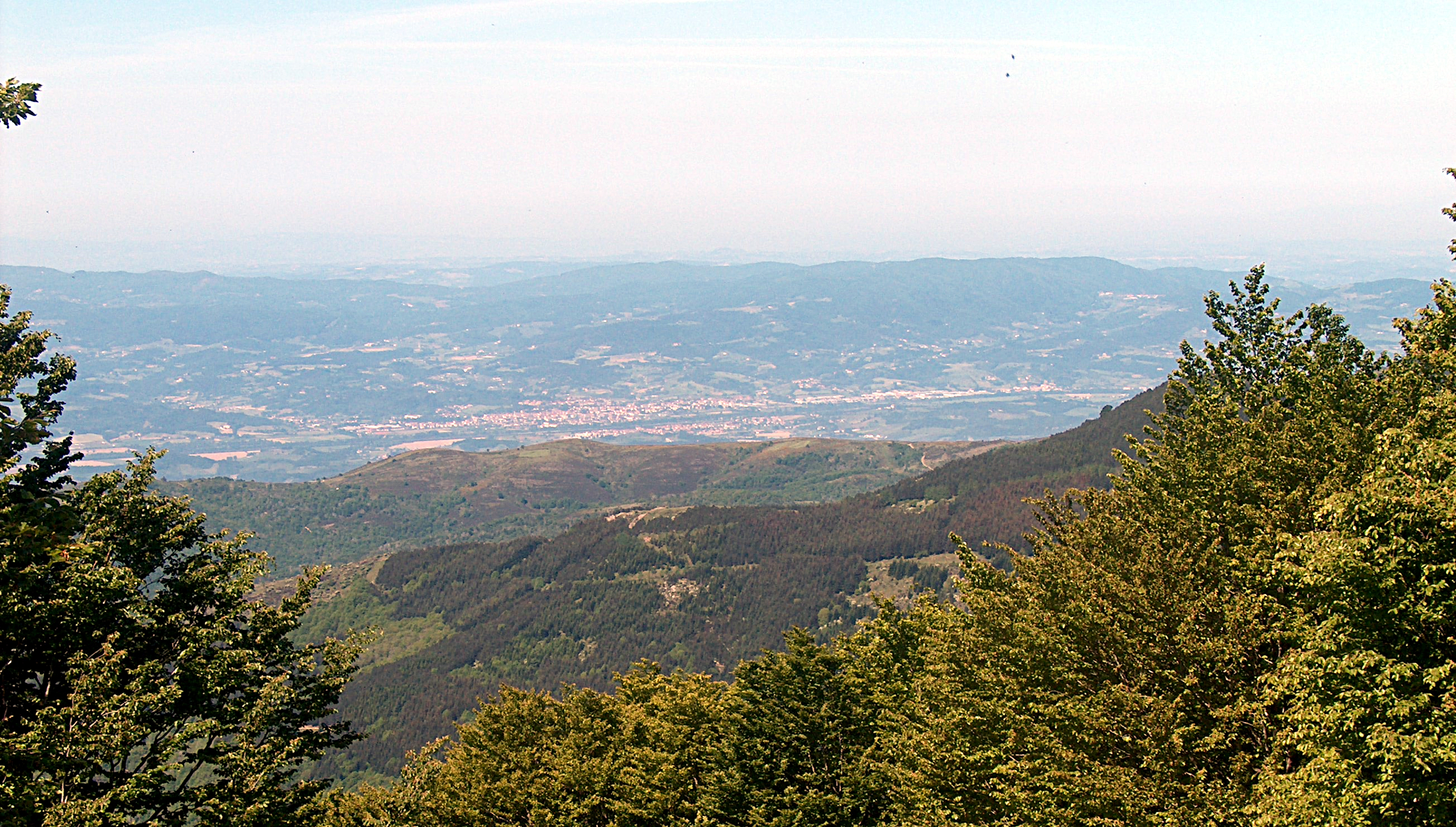
Valdarno as seen from Pratomagno

The Valdarno is the valley of the river Arno, from Florence to the sea. The name applies to the entire river basin, though usage of the term generally excludes Casentino and the valleys formed by major tributaries.

The valley has been renowned since Renaissance for its fossils, dating from the Pliocene to the Early Pleistocene, including species such as the mammoth Mammuthus meridionalis, and the sabertooth cats Homotherium and Megantereon.

Some towns in the area:

- Rignano sull'Arno
- Figline e Incisa Valdarno
- San Giovanni Valdarno
- Montevarchi
- Terranuova Bracciolini
- Reggello
- Castelfranco Piandiscò
