= Archaeological Museum of Casentino "Piero Albertoni" =

- Museo Archeologico del Casentino "Piero Albertoni"
- Location of the museum
- Established: 2013
- Location: Bibbiena, Italy
- Coordinates: 43°41′39″N 11°49′05″E
- Type: Archaeological museum
- Director: Francesco Trenti
- Website: https://www.arcamuseocasentino.it/

The Archaeological Museum of Casentino "Piero Albertoni" is a museum located in Bibbiena, Italy. It occupies the historic site of Palazzo Niccolini, which also represents the seat of the town hall. The museum houses, divided into five rooms (plus a sixth room dedicated to temporary exhibitions), a collection of archaeological objects ranging from Prehistory to the Middle Ages, found over the years in the Casentino region.

== Palazzo Niccolini ==
"Palazzo" Niccolini, the seat of the City Hall, was built beyond the medieval walls in the first half of the 17th century, probably in 1645.

== Exhibitions ==
The first room is dedicated to the prehistory. The showcases present fossil remains of the Villafranch fauna (around 700,000 years ago), consisting of parts of a skeleton of Elephas meridionalis and of a skeleton of an Antiquus hippopotamus, as well as a number of casts of human skulls at various stages of physical evolution that were found in the Area. In the following showcases there are stone objects from the Upper Paleolithic to the Middle Paleolithic, from the Lower Paleolithic to the Bronze Age.

In room 2 there are witnesses to the first presence of the Etruscans in Casentino: Pratello, Serelli and Masseto.

Room 3 is dedicated to Etruscan religiosity and in particular to the Sanctuary of Socana, with the reconstruction of the facade and the coroplastic decorations.

Still in the religious context, room 4 presents the discoveries of the large Etruscan votive site "Lago degli Idoli" on Monte Falterona, which were recovered between 1972 and 2003–2007.

Discoveries from Roman times can be seen in room 5. There are also discoveries from the late Roman period that testify to barbarian invasions.

The last room, number 6, is dedicated to the temporary exhibitions.
