= Castelfranco di Sopra =

Frazione in Tuscany, Italy

- Frazione
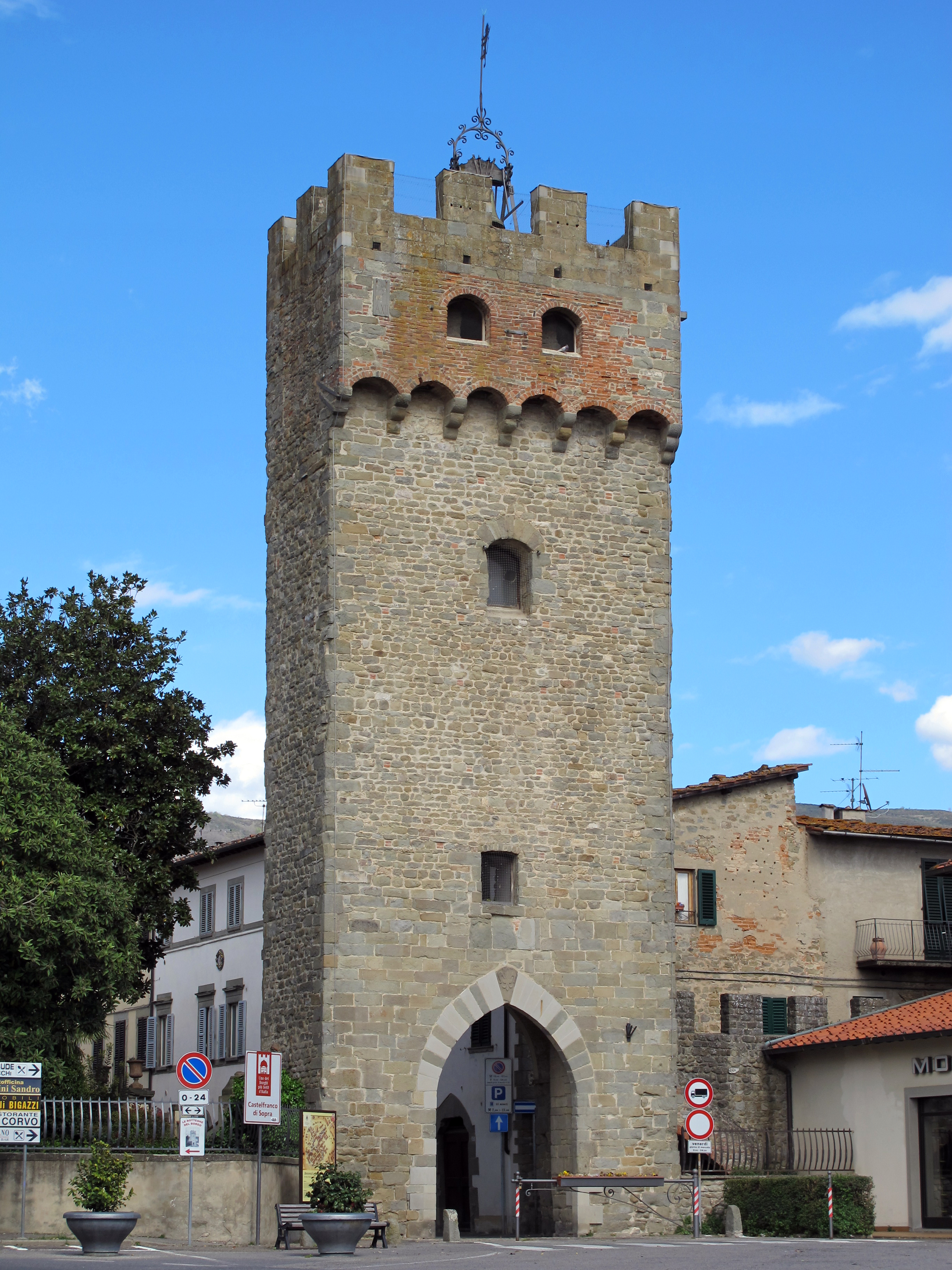

- Location of Castelfranco di Sopra in Italy
- Coordinates: 43.6236°N 11.5583°E
- Country: Italy
- Region: Tuscany
- Province: Arezzo
- Comune: Castelfranco Piandiscò
- Elevation: 281 m (922 ft)

Population (2011)
  - Total: 3,000
- Time zone: UTC+1 (CET)
  - Summer (DST): UTC+2 (CEST)
- Postal code: 52020

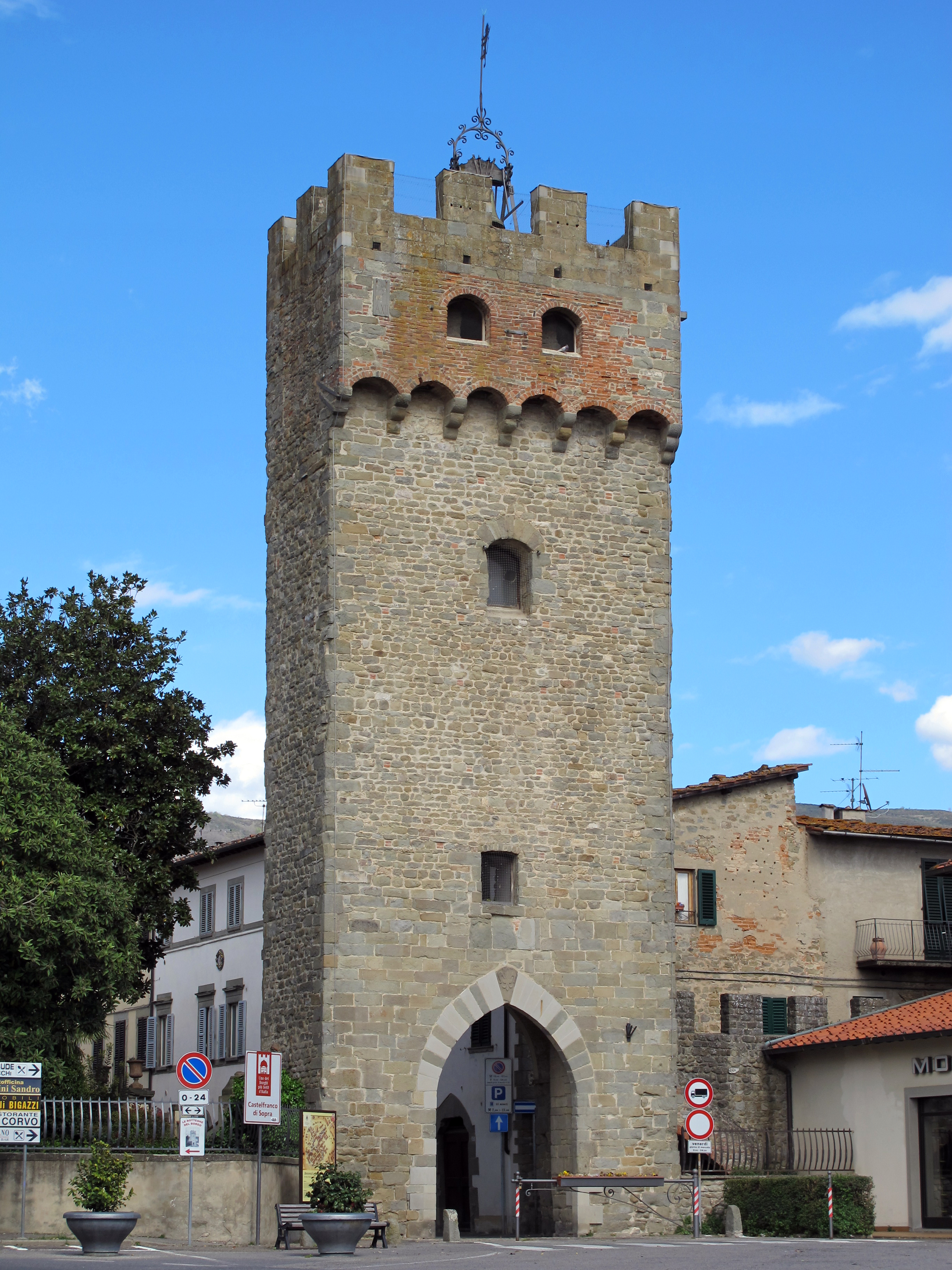
Castelfranco di Sopra

Castelfranco di Sopra is a frazione (parish) of the comune of Castelfranco Piandiscò, in the province of Arezzo, in the Italian region of Tuscany. It is located about 30 kilometres (19 mi) southeast of Florence and about 30 kilometres (19 mi) northwest of Arezzo. It is one of I Borghi più belli d'Italia ("The most beautiful villages of Italy").

It was an autonomous comune until 1 January 2014, when it was merged with Pian di Scò to form the new comune of Castelfranco Piandiscò.
