= Castello di Montemignaio =

Historic Castle in Tuscany, Italy

Coordinates: 43°44′35″N 11°37′47″E

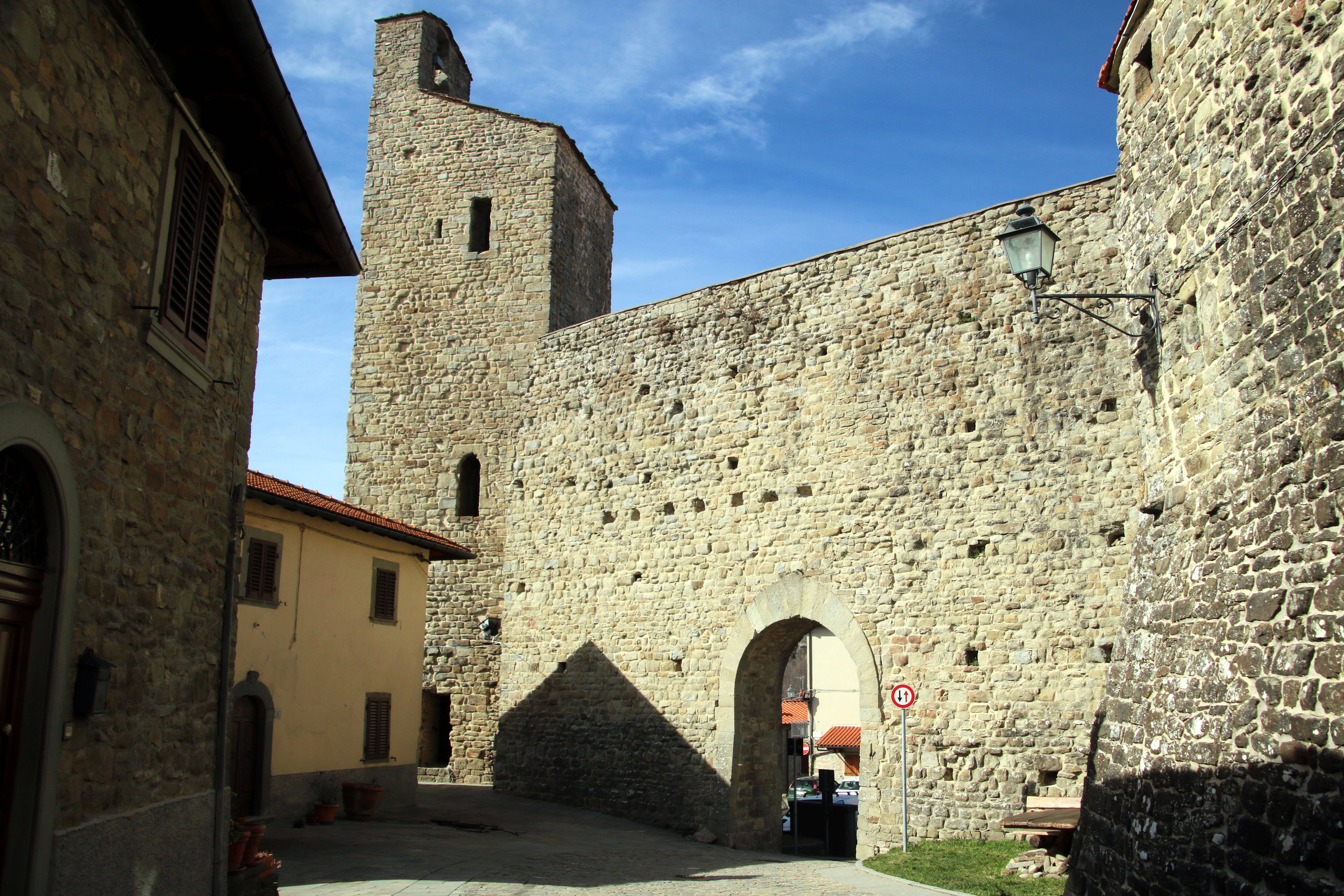
Castel Leone (Montemignaio)

Montemignaio Castle (Castello di Montemignaio) is a castle in the commune of Montemignaio, Province of Arezzo, Tuscany, Italy.

The castle was buit by the noble Guidi family in the 12th century under the name of ‘Castel Leone‘ or simply ‘Castiglione’.
