= Santi Ippolito e Cassiano, Caprese Michelangelo =

Religious building in San Cassiano in Stratina

Santi Ippolito e Cassiano is a church and former pieve located in San Cassiano in Stratino, in the municipality of Caprese Michelangelo, province of Arezzo, central Italy.

Although mentioned for the first time in 1061, it is probably of early Christian origin. The plan was renovated in the years 1523–1526.

It has a single nave, in stone masonry, and an irregular external portal in Renaissance style. To the early 16th century dates a pottery glaze sculpture depicting the "Virgin Crowned by two angels among the Saints Ippolito and Cassiano", attributed to Giovanni della Robbia.
