= Bibbiena =

Bibbiena Bibbliena
- Comune
- Comune di Bibbiena
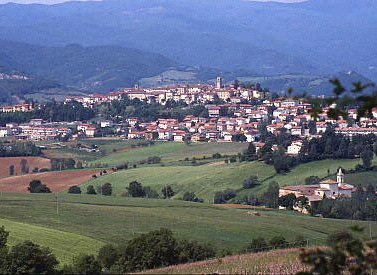
- View of Bibbiena

- Coat of arms

- Location within Italy Location within Tuscany
- Coordinates: 43°42′N 11°49′E
- Country: Italy
- Region: Tuscany
- Province: Arezzo (AR)
- Frazioni: Banzena, Bibbiena Stazione, Campi, Farneta, Marciano, Partina, Pian del ponte, Santa Maria del sasso, Serravalle, Soci, Terrossola

Government
  - Mayor: Filippo Vagnoli (since June 2019)

Area
  - Total: 86 km^{2} (33 sq mi)
- Elevation: 425 m (1,394 ft)

Population (31 December 2013)
  - Total: 12,512
  - Density: 150/km^{2} (380/sq mi)
- Demonym: Bibbienesi
- Time zone: UTC+1 (CET)
  - Summer (DST): UTC+2 (CEST)
- Postal code: 52011
- Dialing code: 0575
- Patron saint: Sant'Ippolito
- Saint day: August 13
- Website: Official website

Bibbiena (Italian pronunciation: [bibˈbjɛːna]) is a town and comune in the province of Arezzo, Tuscany (Italy), the largest town in the valley of Casentino. It is located 60 kilometres (37 mi) from Florence, 30 kilometres (19 mi) from Arezzo, 60 kilometres (37 mi) from Siena, and 20 kilometres (12 mi) from the Sanctuary of La Verna. There are approximately 11,833 inhabitants.

The town is on top of a hill at an elevation of 425 metres (1,394 ft).

== Geography ==
The municipality of Bibbiena is located in the heart of the Casentino, the valley in which the first stretch of the Arno river flows, which, after having crossed the Valdarno (Upper, Middle and Lower), flows into the Tyrrhenian Sea near Pisa. Bibbiena occupies the northern part of the province of Arezzo, is located at an altitude of 425m above sea level and is about 30 km from the provincial capital. Florence, the regional capital, is 60 km further west. It borders to the north with Emilia-Romagna (Province of Forlì-Cesena, municipality of Bagno di Romagna), to the west with Poppi, to the east with Chiusi della Verna, to the south with Castel Focognano, to the south-west with Ortignano Raggiolo.

== History ==
Already mentioned in the works of Dante and Ariosto, Bibbiena offers a wealth of artistic and cultural attractions that are little known. From the Middle Ages to the Renaissance, from the 8th century to the present day, Bibbiena has a series of historical monuments, of which only a few are mentioned here

- Palazzo Mazzoleni
- Palazzo Niccolini seat of the city hall and of the Archaeological Museum of Casentino "Piero Albertoni"
- Palazzo Dovizi, built by Cardinal Bernardo Dovizi, who is usually known as "Bibbiena". He was born in Bibbiena and served as secretary to Giovanni de' Medici (cardinal)(later Pope Leo X).

The religious buildings include:

- The Church of San Lorenzo, famous for the glazed terracotta reliefs by the Della Robbia school
- The Pieve di Sant’Ippolito (Former Chapel of the Tarlati Castle)
- The Rococo Oratorio of San Francesco
- The Sanctuary of Santa Maria del Sasso, one of the most important Renaissance buildings in the Casentino area.

The Sanctuary of Santa Maria del Sasso, a unique example of Renaissance art, is just one kilometre from the residential area of Bibbiena. In the central part of the upper church, you can see the "Madonna del Sasso" by Bicci di Lorenzo, built on a small rock, the top of an enormous boulder: the "Sasso", from which the monastery takes its name. The ancient Marian cult surrounding the boulder prompted the architect to integrate the base of the rock into a small, lower-lying church, which houses the "Madonna del Buio" (Madonna of Darkness), a wooden sculpture from the school of Donatello. A valuable painting of Lappoli can be seen in the third church. In the upper church, on the other hand, there are works by Fra Paolino del Signoraccio, Ligozzi and Ludovico Buti. Finally, in the choir, the large painting of the Assunta by Fra Paolino and Fra Bartolomeo can be seen.

== Society ==
Inhabitants surveyed

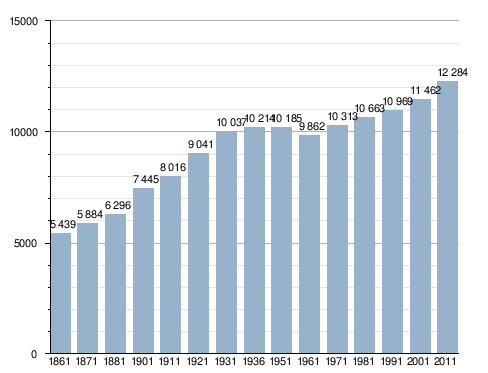

=== Ethnicities and foreign minorities ===
According to ISTAT data as of 31 December 2010, the foreign resident population was 2,104 people. The nationalities most represented on the basis of their percentage of the total resident population were:

- Romania 1,249 9.81%
- India 194 1.52%
- Bangladesh 193 1.52%

=== Traditions and Folklore ===
Every year, in Bibbiena, the historical carnival is celebrated, also known as "Carnevale della Mea" (Carnival of Mea), which traces its roots back to 1337 and is linked to the medieval popular legend of the Mea. On the last day of Carnival, Shrove Tuesday, the traditional propitiatory rite of the "beautiful apple" takes place, during which a juniper is burned by the oldest in the village in the center of the "piazzolina" (Piazza Roma) to reap the good wishes. for the year to come.

== Culture ==
The town holds its yearly "Rievocazione della Mea" festival on the last Sunday of Carnival and Shrove Tuesday as well as a similar celebration in the summer with parades in historical costume and a show in the main square.

=== Theatre ===
The Dovizi Theatre, established in the mid-19th century, is located in Bibbiena.

=== Events ===
The "Sagra delle Sagre" takes place every year in Bibbiena. In the historic centre of the town, many of the Casentino valley festivals gather for a day in June (Cetica, Chiusi della Verna, Corezzo, Faltona, Partina, Pratovecchio Stia, Premilcuore, Rimbocchi, San Piero in Frassino, Subbiano).

== Anthropogenic geography ==
=== Fractions ===
In the territory of Bibbiena, with the exception of the municipal capital, there are twenty-one hamlets

1. Banzena
2. Campi
3. Camprena
4. Candolesi
5. Farneta
6. Freggina
7. Gello
8. Giona
9. Gressa
10. Guazzi
11. Lonnano
12. Marciano
13. Partina
14. Pian del Ponte
15. Poggiolo
16. Ponte Bifolco
17. Querceto
18. Serravalle
19. Soci
20. Terrossola
21. Valchiusa

== Other localities in the area ==
Other relevant localities within the municipal area are those of Casanova, Caselle, Contra, Molino di Gressa, Moscaio, Pianacci, Pollino, Santa Maria del Sasso, and Tramoggiano.

== Economy ==
In the past, the production of Casentino cloth played an important role in the local economy.

== Infrastructure and Transport ==
The municipality is affected by the crossing of the Casentinese railway.

== Administration ==
Below is a table relating to the successive administrations in this municipality.

| Period Starts | Period End | Mayor | Party | Office | Note |
|---|---|---|---|---|---|
| 15 February 1988 | 11 June 1990 | Ezio Bartolini | Partito Comunista Italiano | Sindaco | |
| 11 June 1990 | 24 April 1995 | Ezio Bartolini | Partito Democratico della Sinistra, Partito Comunista Italiano | Sindaco | |
| 24 April 1995 | 14 June 1999 | Giorgio Renzi | Partito Democratico della Sinistra | Sindaco | |
| 14 June 1999 | 14 June 2004 | Ferruccio Ferri | centro-sinistra | Sindaco | |
| 14 June 2004 | 8 June 2009 | Ferruccio Ferri | lista civica | Sindaco | |
| 8 June 2009 | 26 May 2014 | Daniele Bernardini | lista civica | Sindaco | |
| 26 May 2014 | 27 May 2019 | Daniele Bernardini | lista civica | Sindaco | |
| 27 May 2019 | Still in office | Filippo Vagnoli | lista civica | Sindaco | |

== Sister cities ==
- Boulazac, France, since 1989
- (Germany) Ochsenfurt, since 2016
