= La Verna =

Mountain in Italy

Coordinates: 43.707°N 11.931°E

Sanctuary of La Verna
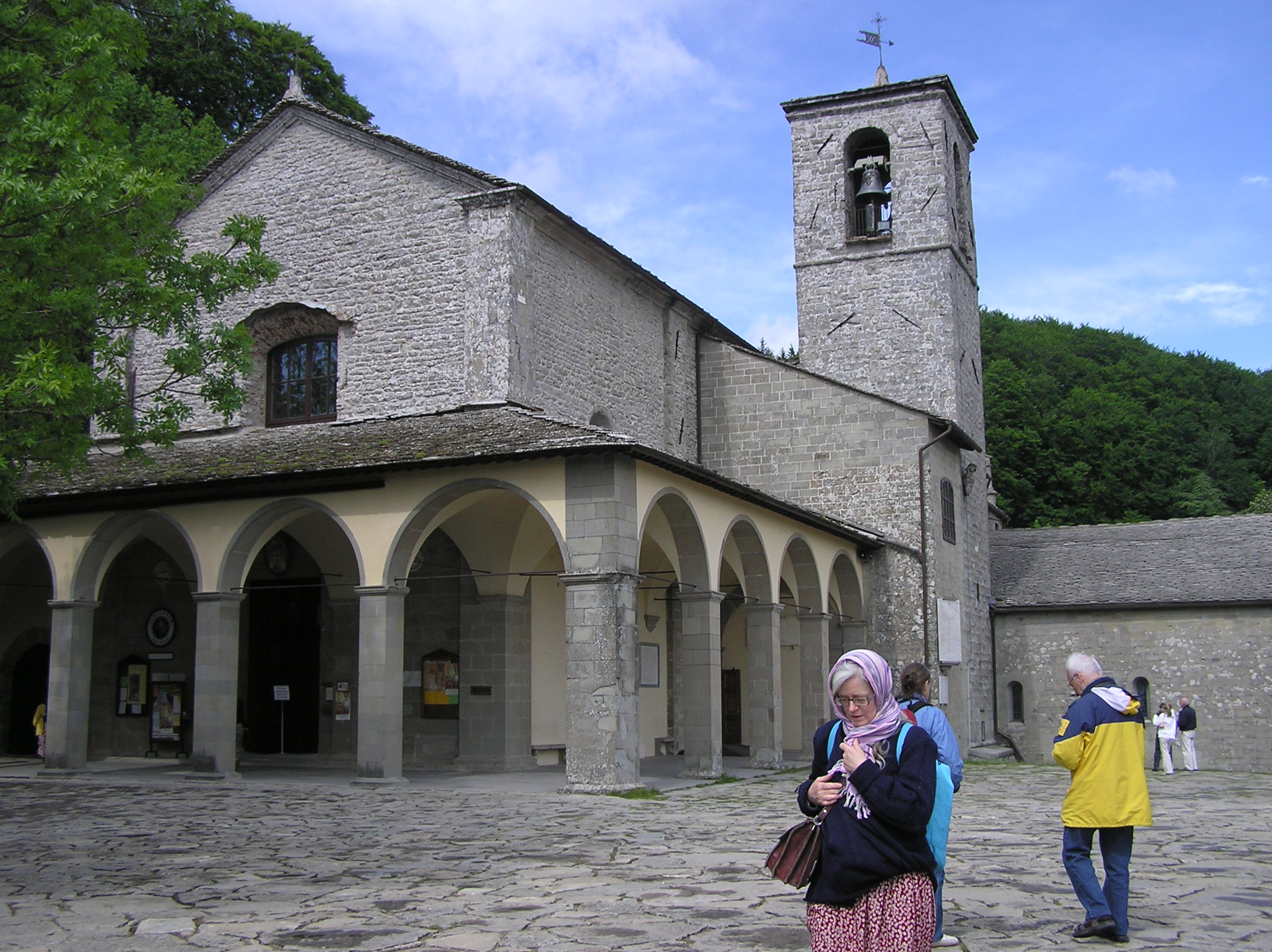
- Basilica of the Sanctuary of La Verna

Religion
- Affiliation: Roman Catholic
- Province: Arezzo
- Rite: Latin Rite
- Ecclesiastical or organizational status: Papal minor basilica

Location
- Location: Chiusi della Verna, Italy
- Interactive map of Sanctuary of La Verna

Architecture
- Type: Church
- Style: Romanesque, Gothic, Renaissance
- Groundbreaking: 1348
- Completed: 1459
- Direction of façade: SW

La Verna (Latin: Alverna) is a locality on Mount Penna (Italian: Monte Penna), an isolated mountain of 1,283 metres (4,209 ft) situated in the centre of the Tuscan Apennines, rising above the valley of the Casentino, central Italy. The place is known especially for its association with Saint Francis of Assisi (he is said to have received the stigmata here) and for the Sanctuary of La Verna (Santuario della Verna), which grew up in his honour. Administratively it falls within the Tuscan province of Arezzo and the comune of Chiusi della Verna, Italy.

The Sanctuary of La Verna, located a few kilometers from Chiusi della Verna (Arezzo), in the National Park of Casentino Forests, Mount Falterona and Campigna, is famous for being the place where St. Francis of Assisi would receive the stigmata on September 14, 1224. Built in the southern part of Mount Penna at 1,128 metres (3,701 ft) high, the Sanctuary is home to numerous chapels and places of prayer and meditation In August 1921 Pope Benedict XV elevated the church to the status of minor basilica.

== Name origin ==
A sanctuary was built atop a place of worship site of the ancient goddess Laverna. Father Salvatore Vitale, a Franciscan scholar of the seventeenth century, wrote:

"About the reason why this Sacred Mount was called Laverna.
This sacred Mount, for ancient tradition of memory it is known, and for many authors, that it was named Laverna after a temple of Laverna, pagan goddess of thieves, built there, and attended by many crassatori and thieves who were in the thick forest that covers it; and thick, deep and horrible caves and ravines, where they dwelt safe to loot and plunder them wayfarers..."

The ancient pagan worship of the goddess Laverna, was the protector of refugees. The municipality of Chiusi della Verna in the valley is also named for the goddess. The crevices and other hiding places in this territory, suggest such a purpose. The same meaning associated with the worship of the god of the mountain Pen, from which the Apennines and Mount Pen are named.

== History ==
La Verna is one of the most famous monasteries of the Casentino, and one of the most important Franciscan. St. Francis in the spring of 1213 met the Count Orlando of Chiusi della Verna, who, impressed by his preaching, made a gift of La Verna to him and his followers. It became a place of numerous and prolonged periods of withdrawal. Some small cells were built and the church of Santa Maria degli Angeli (1216–18). The decisive impulse to the development of a large monastery was given by the episode of the stigmata (1224). The last visit of Francis to the mountain was in the summer of 1224. He retired in August, for a 40-day fast in preparation for the feast of St. Michael, and while he was absorbed in prayer, he received the stigmata. Pope Alexander IV took the site under papal protection and in 1260 a church was built and consecrated. St. Bonaventure and many bishops were in attendance. A few years later the Chapel of the Stigmata was built by Count Simon of Battifolle, close to the place of the miracle. An older chapel, Santa Maria degli Angeli, had been built in 1218 by St. Francis. The main church was begun in 1348 but remained unfinished until 1459. From the main church, the friars make a solemn procession twice a day to the Chapel of the Stigmata.

The monastery was partially destroyed by fire in the fifteenth century and later restored. The restorations took three centuries. In 1810 and in 1866 the friars were expelled temporarily following the suppression of religious orders.

== La Verna and Saint Francis of Assisi ==
Count Orlando of Chiusi gave La Verna to Francis on May 8, 1213 as a retreat specially favourable for contemplation, and in 1218 built him the chapel Santa Maria degli Angeli.

"I have in Tuscany a diverse little mountain, which is called the mountain of Alvernia, which is the very lonely and savage act and it's good for those who want to do penance in a place removed from the people, or those who want to lonely life. If you like, I will gladly give it to you and your comrades for my soul." (Count Orlando of Chiusi della Verna before donating the mountain to St. Francis of Assisi, 1213.)

In August, 1224, frustrated by the changes in the Order of Friars Minor, Francis withdrew to La Verna to keep a forty days fast in preparation for Michaelmas. As he arrived he was allegedly received by a multitude of singing birds which surrounded St Francis, some perching upon his shoulders, some on his arms, and others at his feet. While praying on the mountain-side he received (on or about 14 September) the stigmata. After seeing a vision of a seraphim he began to develop nails of hardened flesh which protruded from his hands and feet. He also began to form a wound in his side like that of Christ. Thus La Verna came to be seen as sacred ground. Pope Alexander IV took it under his protection. In 1260 a church was consecrated there in presence of St. Bonaventure and several bishops. A few years later the Chapel of the Stigmata was erected, paid for by Count Simone of Battifole, near the spot where the miracle took place. The Chiesa Maggiore was begun in 1348, although not finished until 1459.

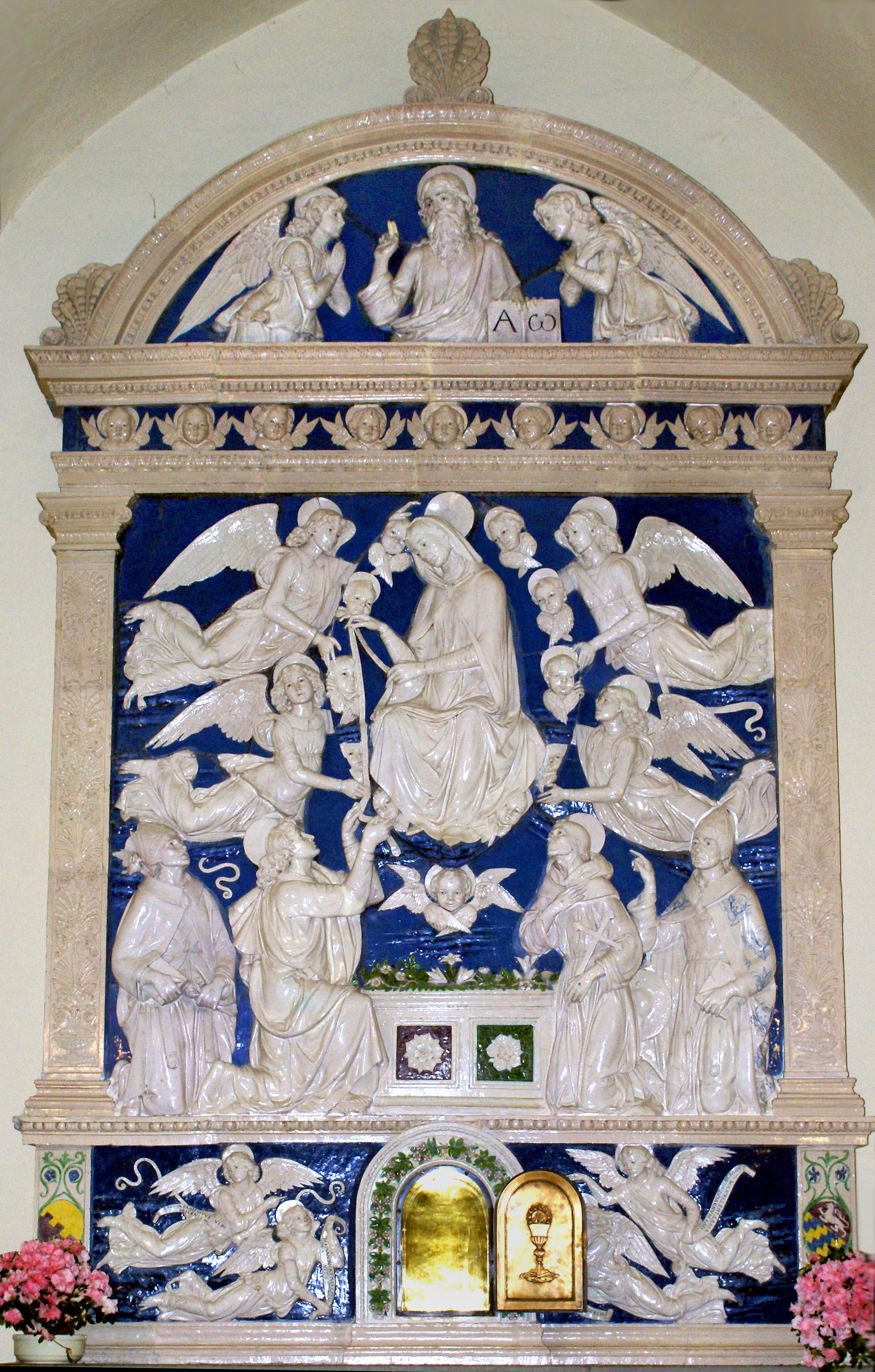
Assumption of the Virgin, lead-glazed terracotta, by Andrea Della Robbia, in the sanctuary.

=== The convent ===
From the Chiesa Maggiore the friars dwelling on La Verna go in solemn procession twice daily to the Chapel of the Stigmata. On the Feast of the Stigmata (September 17) and on other festivals, large crowds of priests with their people from neighbouring parishes, as well as strangers, visit the mountains, and on such occasions the friars often accommodate and entertain between 2,000 and 3,000 pilgrims. The friary was partly destroyed by fire in the 15th century; it suffered desecration also during the war of this century. In 1810, and again in 1866, the friars were expelled in consequence of the suppression of religious orders; but at present they are in full possession of La Verna.

== Buildings ==
=== Chapel of Santa Maria degli Angeli ===
The building was the Chapel of Santa Maria degli Angeli (Mary in Heaven), built in 1216 by St. Francis himself. He took the name from his home in Assisi. It was also in 1216, that Francis experienced the apparition Mary. Count Orlando helped finance the original plan. It was after only 1250, that the church was enlarged at the direction of Cardinal Rainaldo and Pope Innocent IV. It was consecrated in 1260.

To the right of the Major Basilica, under a low porch is the chapel. It has a single nave, divided into two parts. Renovated and expanded after 1250. Of the original structure only the bell of 1257, on the belfry remains unchanged.

Inside are two paintings of the Florentine painter Ferdinand Folchi of 1877. They depict a meeting between St. Francis and the Count Orlando Catani at the fortress of San Leo in Montefeltro, when he give the sacred Mount of Verna to the friars, 8 May 1213, the other depicts the dedication of the church Santa Maria degli Angeli.

The partition between the two parts have two reliefs of glazed earthenware, one depicts the Nativity with St. Francis and St. Anthony, the other the Pietà between the Virgin and St. John, both by Andrea with his son Luke Bartholomew II said "the Young" Della Robbia; They are dated between 1490 and 1493. Above the altar is the reredos, of glazed earthenware. It depicts the Assumption where Mary gives her sacred girdle to St. Thomas, with St. Gregory, Francis and Bonaventura.

=== Quadrant ===
The quadrant is the paved square with a view over valley. It takes its name from the sundial, which is engraved on the wall of the bell tower. In the square there is a large wooden cross planted in the rock. On the left is the well for the guesthouse: it is a cistern of the sixteenth century that was used for pilgrims and guests. In front of the square, there is the portico of the Major Basilica; under the porch right, finished in 1536 but completely rebuilt after World War II, there is a crucifix that spans San Francisco, bronze copy is from a painting of Spanish Murillo and work of Vincent Rosignoli, donated to La Verna in 1888 by Pope Leo XIII. The same artist painted, in 1903, the bronze statue of St. Francis with a child, placed at the entrance gate of the entire religious complex.

=== Basilica Major ===
The construction of the Basilica was begun in 1348. It was a gift of Count Tarlato Pietramala. It was not completed until 1509, thanks to the contribution of the Wool Guild of Florence. Overlooking the quadrant, the church was dedicated to the Virgin Mary, and consecrated in 1568. The portico is of Renaissance design and extends around the right side almost to the bell tower. The church is built as a Latin cross with a single nave and vaulted ceilings.

Inside, there are several glazed earthenware images. To the right near the front door, Our Lady of Refuge (i.e.; Enthroned Madonna and Child with Saints Onofrio, Anthony Abbot, Francis and Mary Magdalene), given to the Monastery by the shopkeepers and the results of Andrea della Robbia, 1500-1510. Further in on the right, is the chapel of the relics, (1635), with the saint's robe, a remnant of his blood, other relics.

Beyond the second entrance to the church is an entrance to the Chapel of the Nativity, which is access to the Chapel of Santa Maria degli Angeli. As you approach the entrance to the presbytery and the sacristy is another side chapel, commissioned by Prince Piero Ginori Conti (chapel Ginori) in the late nineteenth century It was consecrated by the bishop Emanuele Mignone in 1939, and sporting the second pipe organ.

Behind the chancel is the choir, with two rows of walnut stalls in the central part, with inlays depicting Santa Maria Assunta, San Lorenzo and Blessed John, the work of the twentieth century between Leonardo Galiberti from Woodshed. Additional inlays from 1509 by Piero Zanobi. On both sides of the presbytery there are two figures of St. Francis and St. Anthony Abbot (about 1475-80).

The chapel to the left of the presbytery has the organ. The chapel is dedicated to the 'Ascension of Jesus, with the impressive work of the same name in glazed terracotta by Andrea della Robbia and his son Luke Bartholomew II in 1480. Looking back on the left side of the church, the chapel front mate with the colonnade is dedicated to the 'Annunciation, and retains the same name by Andrea della Robbia, dated 1475.

Going further back to the entrance, the chapel of St. Michael, which holds the remains of Blessed John of La Verna (or from Fermo), brother of the thirteenth century which Christ appeared at the site of the chapel of the beech, a small stone building in woods over the Sanctuary.

== Corridor of the Stigmata ==
Leading of to the right of the Basilica Maggiore, is access to corridor of the Stigmata.

First is a small chapel, dedicated to Count Checco Montedoglio and containing a Pieta with Saints John the Evangelist, Mary Magdalene, Francis, Archangel Michael, Anthony of Padua and Jerome (circa 1525-1532) sculpted by Santi Buglioni. The Corridor of the Stigmata was covered between 1578 and 1582. Since 1431, the daily procession of the ninth hour (1500 hr or 3:00 p.m.) occurs. The passageway is lined with frescoes representing the episodes of the life of St. Francis. Eighteen panels were made by Baccio Maria Bacci in two stages between 1929 and 1962 to replace the seventeenth-century frescoes by Fra Emmanuel from Como, already renewed in 1840 by Luigi and Giovanni Ademollo, whose work is still visible in the last three boxes. About halfway up the corridor is a doorway, out to the "bed" of St. Francis. It is a small cave, where the saint rested on the bare ground. To protect the ground from those who would remove it, a grid was placed there.

=== Chapel of the Stigmata ===
At the end of the Corridor of the Stigmata, are several small rooms. On the right is the Chapel Loddi, with the access to the hermitage. Ahead is the Chapel of the Cross. To the left with the Oratory of St. Anthony, the chapel of St. Bonaventure and St. Sebastian, while on the left the chapel of the Madonna della Scala. At the end is the chapel of the Stigmata, the heart of the sanctuary. It was built around 1263, a nave, covered by a cross vault. On the floor, is marked by a plaque would be the place where the miracle of the stigmata. Above the door is a round of the workshop of Andrea della Robbia and workshop with students of the Madonna and Child blessing, of 1480-1485.

On the back wall, is placed a monumental arched blade, always glazed earthenware, depicting the Crucifixion, among angels, with the foot of the Madonna, St. John St. Francis and St. Jerome mourners, followed in 1481 by Andrea della Robbia. This marks the spot where Francis of Assisi is said to have received the first stigmata in Christian history, in 1224.

== Forest Monumental de La Verna ==
The Forest Monumental de La Verna has been preserved by the Franciscan Friars. They have sought to maintain harmony between man and nature. The forest is a Spruce-Beech forest. Some specimens of up to 50 metres (160 ft) in height and diameters up to 180 centimetres (5.9 ft). In the northwest area is the beech forest. The Forest has an extraordinary wealth of plant and the presence of a large wildlife. There are deer, fallow deer, roe deer and wild boar, with their natural predator, the wolf. Bird species are varied with the inclusion of eagle, owl and peregrine falcon.

== See also ==
- Alwernia
- Foreste Casentinesi, Monte Falterona e Campigna National Park
