= Chitignano =

- Comune
- Comune di Chitignano
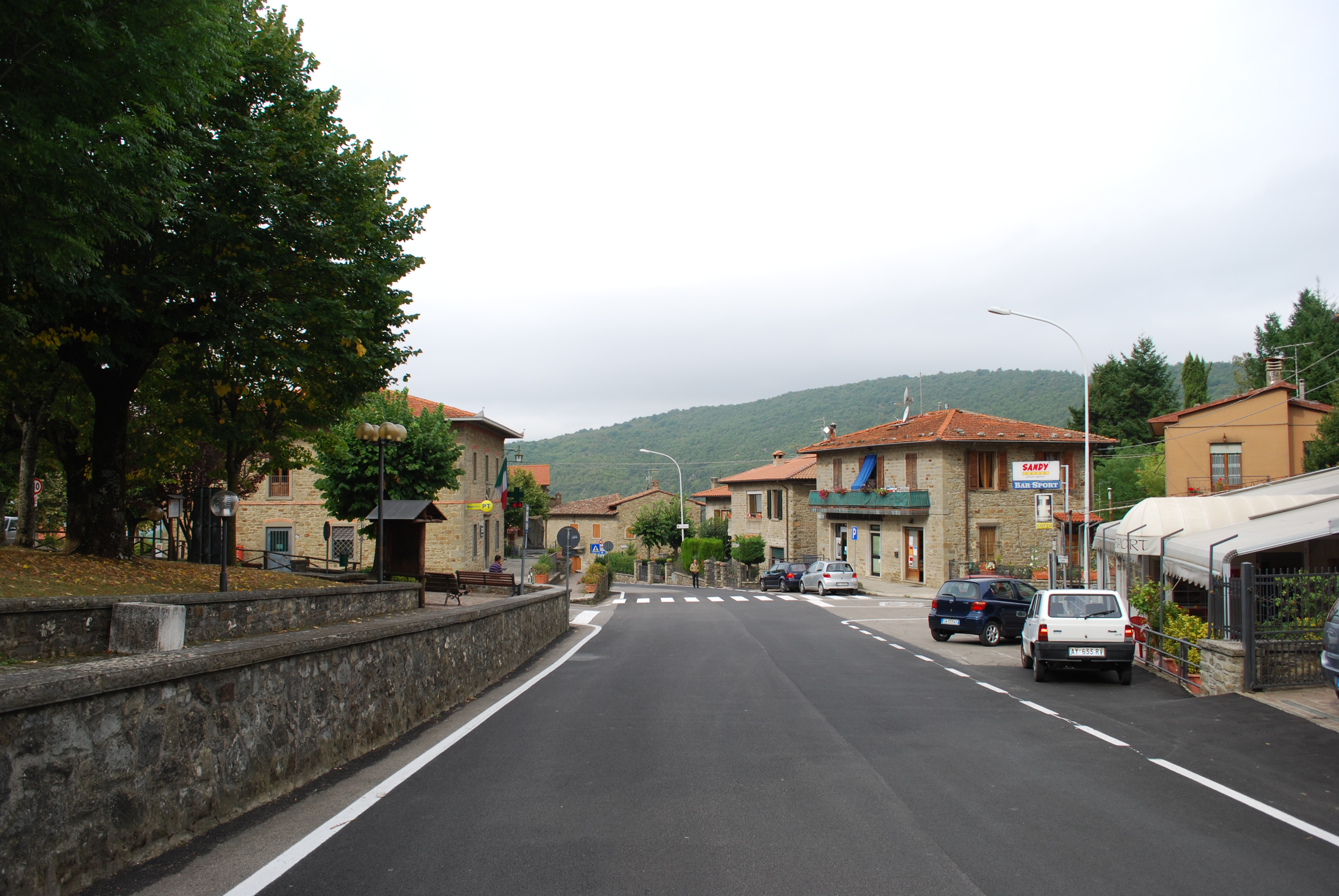
- View of Chitignano

- Location within Italy Location within Tuscany
- Coordinates: 43°40′N 11°53′E
- Country: Italy
- Region: Tuscany
- Province: Province of Arezzo (AR)

Area
  - Total: 14.7 km^{2} (5.7 sq mi)
- Elevation: 582 m (1,909 ft)

Population (Dec. 2004)
  - Total: 996
  - Density: 67.8/km^{2} (175/sq mi)
- Time zone: UTC+1 (CET)
  - Summer (DST): UTC+2 (CEST)
- Postal code: 52010
- Dialing code: 0575

Chitignano is a comune (municipality) in the Province of Arezzo in the Italian region Tuscany, located about 50 kilometres (31 mi) east of Florence and about 20 kilometres (12 mi) north of Arezzo. As of 31 December 2004, it had a population of 996 and an area of 14.7 square kilometres (5.7 mi^{2}).

Chitignano borders the following municipalities: Caprese Michelangelo, Chiusi della Verna, Subbiano.

== Demographics ==
Historical population

Year	Pop.	±%
1861	1,170	—
1871	1,255	+7.3%
1881	1,319	+5.1%
1901	1,723	+30.6%
1911	1,731	+0.5%

Year	Pop.	±%
1921	1,792	+3.5%
1931	1,658	−7.5%
1936	1,627	−1.9%
1951	1,570	−3.5%
1961	961	−38.8%

Year	Pop.	±%
1971	841	−12.5%
1981	806	−4.2%
1991	817	+1.4%
2001	954	+16.8%

Source: Data from ISTAT
