= Ortignano Raggiolo =

- Comune
- Comune di Ortignano Raggiolo
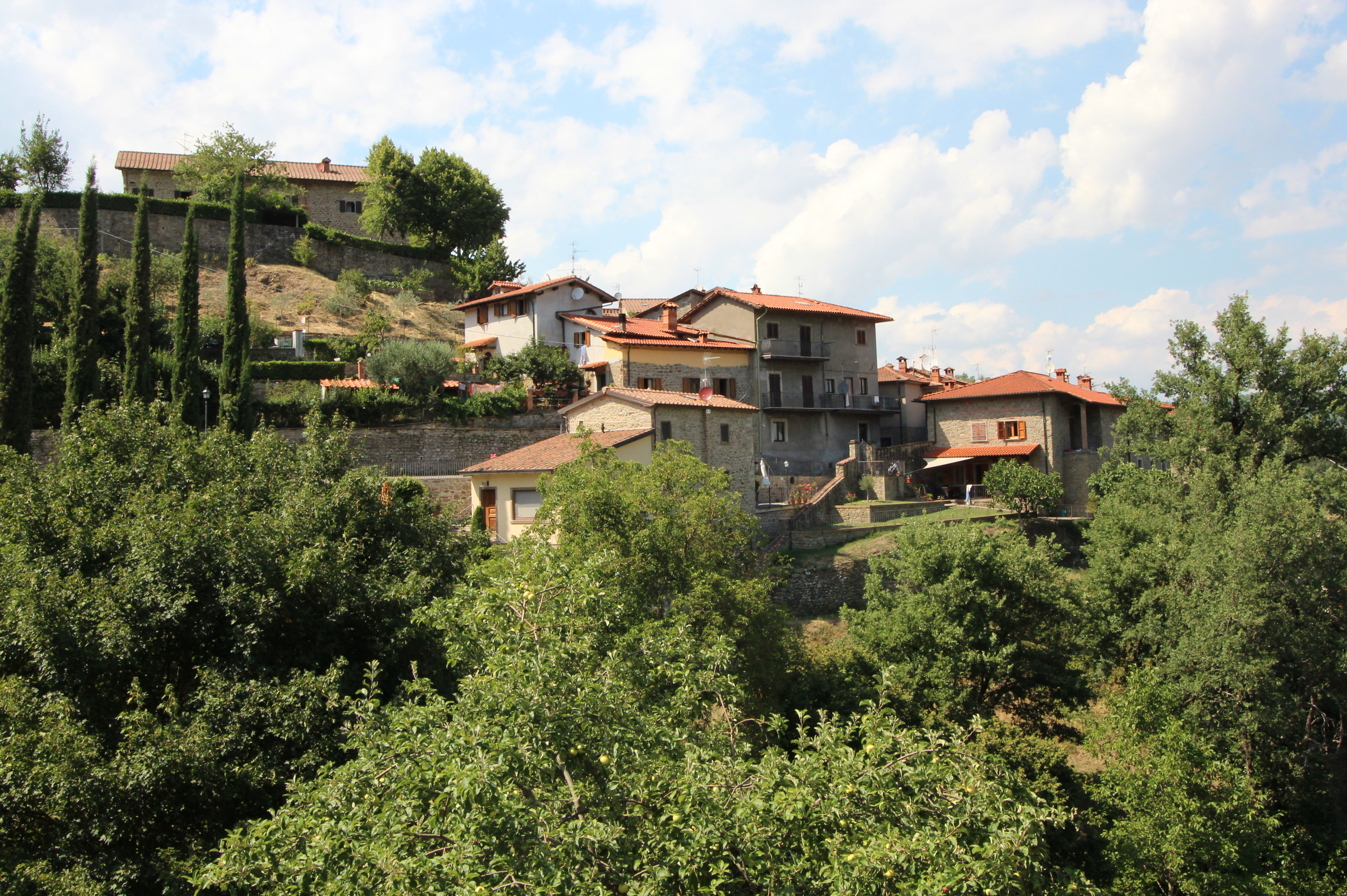
- Panorama of Ortignano

- Coat of arms

- Location within Italy Location within Tuscany
- Coordinates: 43°41′N 11°45′E
- Country: Italy
- Region: Tuscany
- Province: Arezzo (AR)
- Frazioni: Badia a Tega, Raggiolo, San Piero in Frassino, Villa

Government
  - Mayor: Fiorenzo Pistolesi

Area
  - Total: 36.4 km^{2} (14.1 sq mi)
- Elevation: 483 m (1,585 ft)

Population (31 December 2017)
  - Total: 881
  - Density: 24.2/km^{2} (62.7/sq mi)
- Demonym(s): Ortignanesi and Raggiolatti
- Time zone: UTC+1 (CET)
  - Summer (DST): UTC+2 (CEST)
- Postal code: 52010
- Dialing code: 0575
- Website: Official website

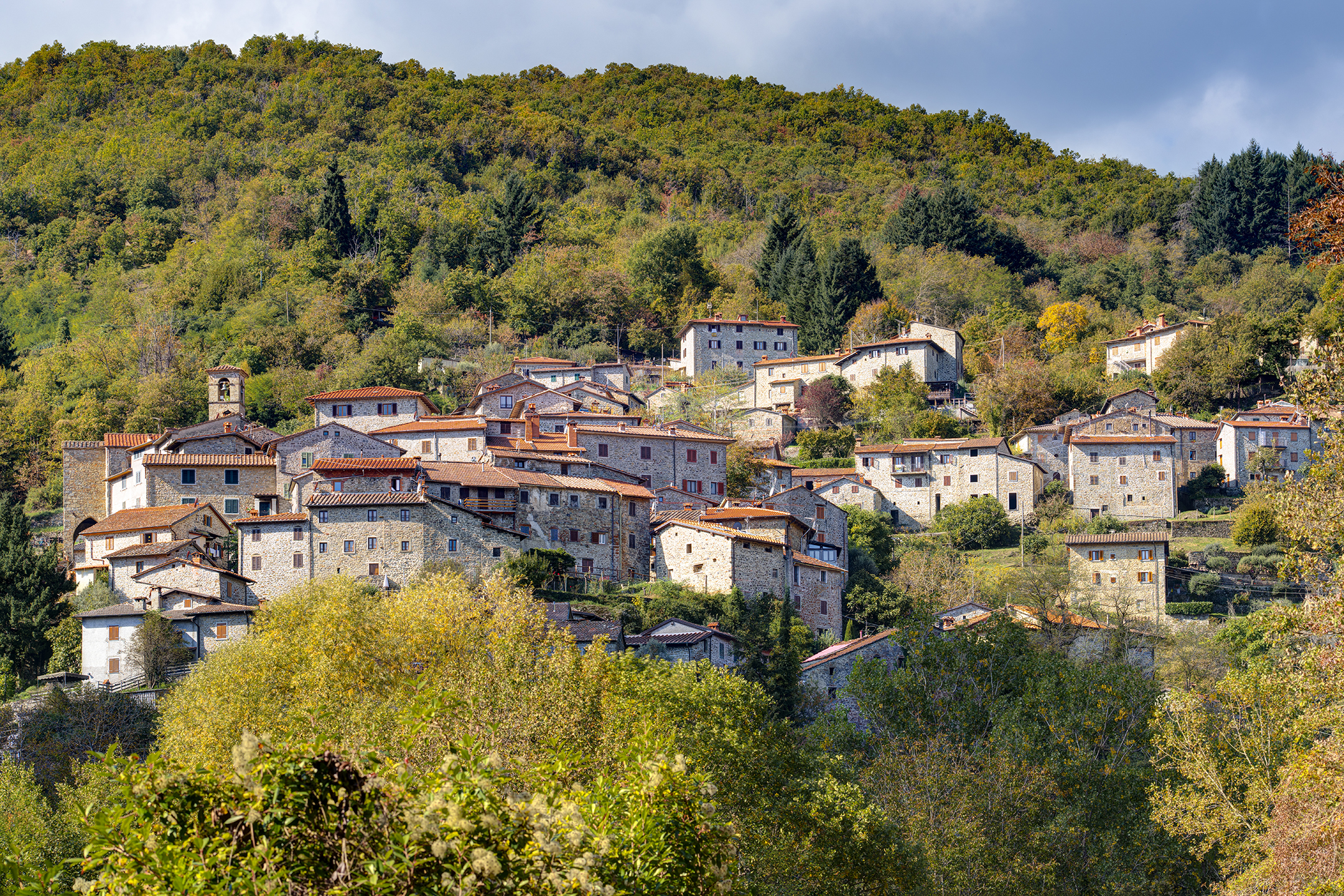
Raggiolo, view from Strada Provinciale 64 di Ortignano Raggiolo

Ortignano Raggiolo is a comune (municipality) in the Province of Arezzo in the Italian region Tuscany, located about 40 kilometres (25 mi) southeast of Florence and about 25 kilometres (16 mi) northwest of Arezzo.

Ortignano Raggiolo borders the following municipalities: Bibbiena, Castel Focognano, Castel San Niccolò, Loro Ciuffenna, Poppi. It is one of I Borghi più belli d'Italia ("The most beautiful villages of Italy").
