= Terranuova Bracciolini =

- Comune
- Comune di Terranuova Bracciolini
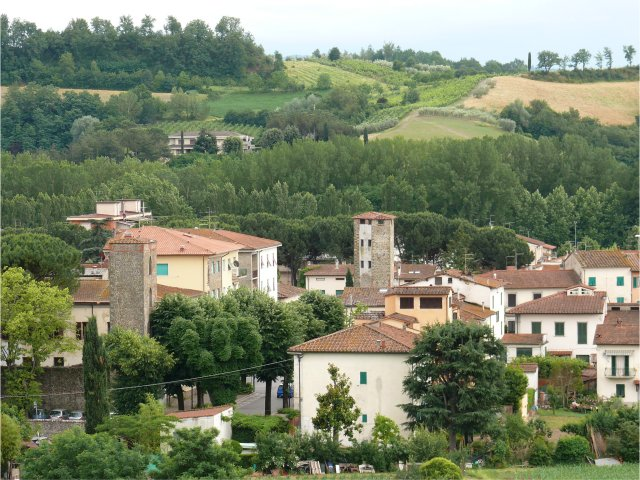
- Panorama of Terranuova Bracciolini

- Location within Italy Location within Tuscany
- Coordinates: 43°33′N 11°35′E
- Country: Italy
- Region: Tuscany
- Province: Province of Arezzo (AR)
- Frazioni: Campogialli, Castiglione Ubertini, Cicogna, Doccio, Malva, Montalto, Montemarciano, Penna, Persignano, Piantravigne, Tasso, Traiana, Treggiaia, Ville

Government
  - Mayor: Sergio Chienni

Area
  - Total: 85.88 km^{2} (33.16 sq mi)
- Elevation: 156 m (512 ft)

Population (1 January 2025)
  - Total: 12,087
  - Density: 140.7/km^{2} (364.5/sq mi)
- Demonym: Terranuovesi
- Time zone: UTC+1 (CET)
  - Summer (DST): UTC+2 (CEST)
- Postal code: 52028
- Dialing code: 0575
- Patron saint: Anthony of Padua
- Saint day: 13 June
- Website: Official website

Terranuova Bracciolini is a comune (municipality) in the Province of Arezzo in the Italian region Tuscany, located about 35 kilometres (22 mi) southeast of Florence and about 25 kilometres (16 mi) northwest of Arezzo.

Terranuova Bracciolini borders the following municipalities: Castelfranco Piandiscò, Castiglion Fibocchi, Laterina Pergine Valdarno, Loro Ciuffenna, Montevarchi, San Giovanni Valdarno.

Known historically as just Terranuova, the municipality was the birthplace in 1380 of the famed early humanist Poggio Bracciolini, for which it was renamed in 1862.
