= Castel San Niccolò =

- Comune
- Comune di Castel San Niccolò
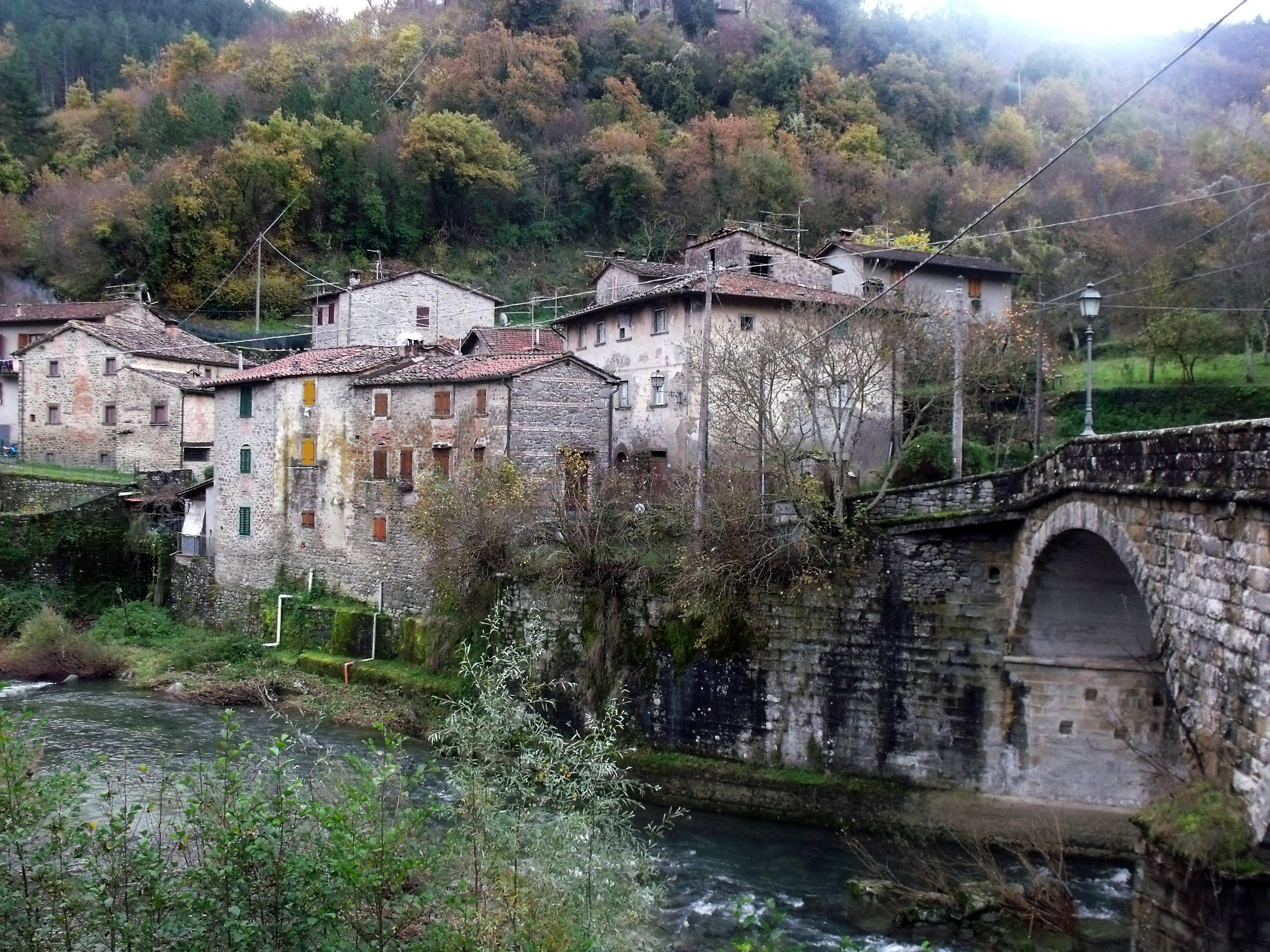
- Panorama of Borgo Castellano

- Coat of arms

- Location within Italy Location within Tuscany
- Coordinates: 43°45′N 11°43′E
- Country: Italy
- Region: Tuscany
- Province: Arezzo (AR)
- Frazioni: Borgo alla Collina, Cetica, Prato di Strada, Garliano, Caiano, Rifiglio, Battifolle, Ristonchi, Terzelli, Pagliericcio

Government
  - Mayor: Paolo Agostini

Area
  - Total: 83.27 km^{2} (32.15 sq mi)
- Elevation: 380 m (1,250 ft)

Population (30 June 2017)
  - Total: 2,662
  - Density: 31.97/km^{2} (82.80/sq mi)
- Demonym: Stradini
- Time zone: UTC+1 (CET)
  - Summer (DST): UTC+2 (CEST)
- Postal code: 52018, 52010
- Dialing code: 0575
- Patron saint: St. Martin
- Saint day: November 11
- Website: Official website

Castel San Niccolò is a comune (municipality) in the Province of Arezzo in the Italian region Tuscany, located about 40 kilometres (25 mi) northwest of Arezzo and about 35 kilometres (22 mi) east of Florence. Its main center is the village of Strada in Casentino, overlooked by the Castle of the Counts Guidi, from which the name of the municipality itself derives. The main town of the municipality is Strada in Casentino, a mostly residential zone.

Castel San Niccolò borders the following municipalities: Castelfranco Piandiscò, Loro Ciuffenna, Montemignaio, Ortignano Raggiolo, Poppi, Pratovecchio Stia, Reggello.

== Sister cities ==
- Pégomas, France
