= Badia Tedalda =

- Comune
- Comune di Badia Tedalda
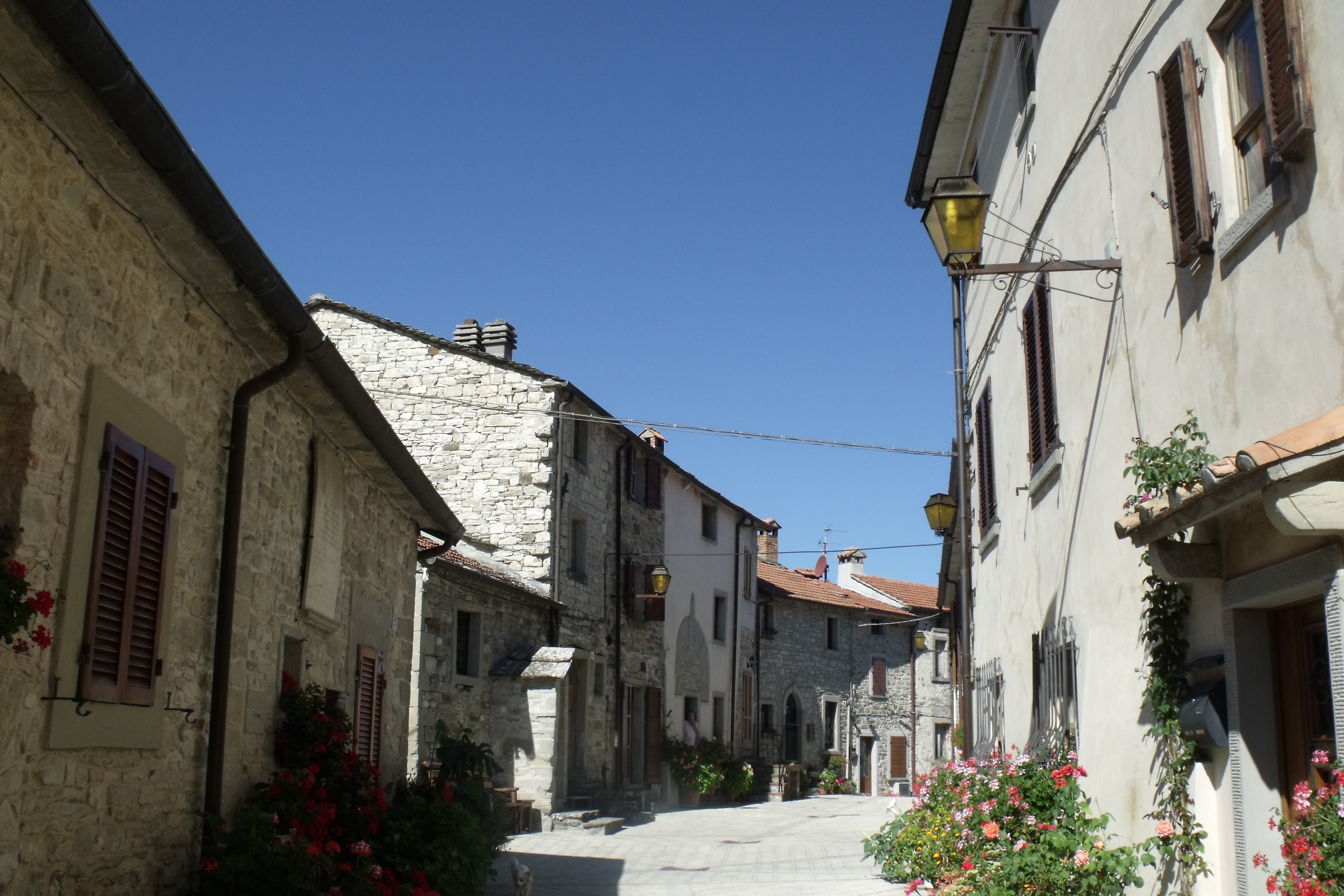
- Via Castello in Badia Tedalda Alta

- Location within Italy Location within Tuscany
- Coordinates: 43°42′N 12°11′E
- Country: Italy
- Region: Tuscany
- Province: Arezzo (AR)
- Frazioni: Arsicci, Caprile, Ca' Raffaello, Fresciano, Montelabreve, Monte Viale, Pratieghi, Rofelle, Sant’Andrea, Santa Sofia Capannello, Santa Sofia Marecchia, Monterotondo di Badia Tedalda, Stiavola, Svolta del Podere

Government
  - Mayor: Alberto Santucci

Area
  - Total: 119.03 km^{2} (45.96 sq mi)
- Elevation: 700 m (2,300 ft)

Population (31 May 2022)
  - Total: 971
  - Density: 8.16/km^{2} (21.1/sq mi)
- Demonym: Badiali
- Time zone: UTC+1 (CET)
  - Summer (DST): UTC+2 (CEST)
- Postal code: 53032
- Dialing code: 0575
- Patron saint: St. Michael Archangel
- Saint day: September 29

Badia Tedalda is a comune (municipality) in the Province of Arezzo in the Italian region Tuscany, located about 80 kilometres (50 mi) east of Florence and about 35 kilometres (22 mi) northeast of Arezzo. Two of its frazioni, Santa Sofia Marecchia and Cicognaia, form an exclave of the province of Arezzo (Ca' Raffaello) surrounded by the Province of Rimini, Emilia-Romagna region.
