= Valtiberina =

Valley in Italy

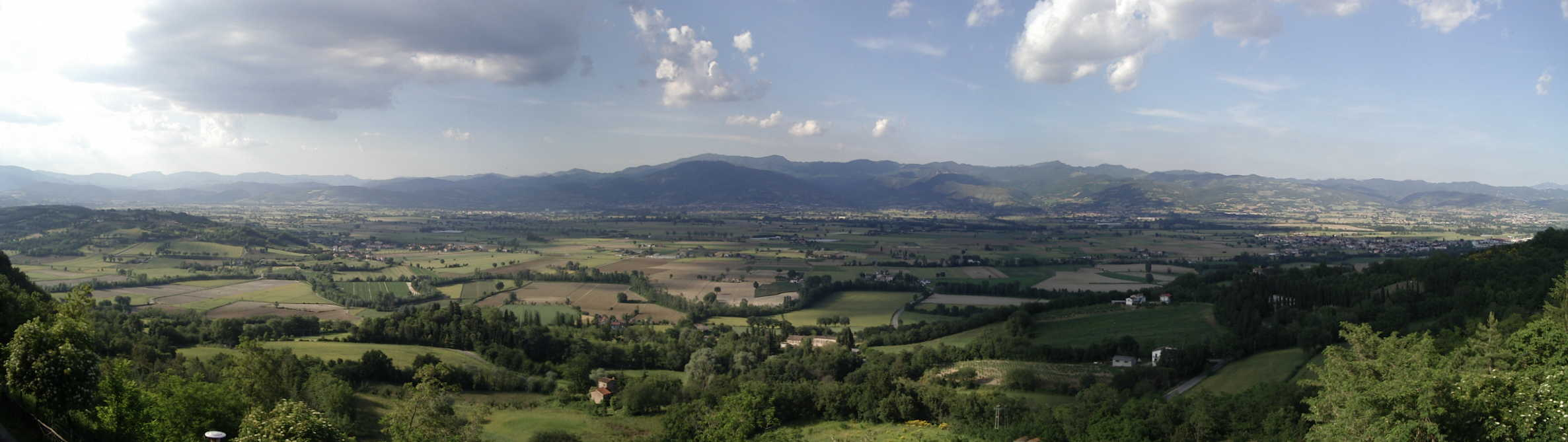
- Valtiberina seen from Citerna

Geography
- Coordinates: 43°20′N 12°42′E
- Interactive map of Valtiberina

Valtiberina is a valley crossed by the upper course of the Tiber (which originates from Monte Fumaiolo in Emilia-Romagna), unfolding between Tuscany, Umbria and Romagna, parallel to the Casentino.

== Geography ==
Valtiberina is bordered to the west by Alpe di Catenaia and to the east by Alpe della Luna.

The description of the valley made between the 1st and 2nd centuries AD is very famous. by Pliny the Younger (61-113) in a letter written to his friend Apollinare. Pliny had his favorite villa in Valtiberina and thus describes the landscape:

The appearance of the town is beautiful: imagine an immense amphitheater which only nature can create. [...] Although there is an abundance of water, there are no swamps because the sloping land drains the water it has received and not absorbed into the Tiber [...]; the ground rises so smoothly and with an almost insensitive slope that, while you feel like you haven't climbed, you're already on top. Behind you have the Apennines […]. You know now why I prefer my villa “in Tuscis” to the one in Tuscolo, Tivoli and Preneste.

In recent times, the scholar Mariella Zoppi wrote:

a territory of great interest under many aspects that are revealed since its geographical location straddling the Tyrrhenian basin and the Adriatic and a crossroads between Tuscany, Marche, Romagna and Umbria. Like all border lands, today it presents itself as a formidable meeting point between cultures, art forms and traditions, its arrangement between the Apennines and the Tiber valley offers an incredible variety of landscapes, punctuated by a dense network of assets historical-architectural and natural emergencies, which are accompanied by the richness of an intangible culture made up of ancient traditions, legends, festivals and popular festivals, and a cuisine that ranges from a spartan simplicity to the exclusive delicacy of its truffles. We are faced with a cultural landscape with very high tourist potential, characterized by the sequence of its landscapes that from the sources of the Tiber passes to the Rognosi Mountains, where the alkalinity of the rocks makes the vegetation sparse, to the Alpe di Catenaria and the Alpe della Luna, from the sides covered with chestnut trees to which oak and beech trees are added, up to the monumentality of geo-morphological exceptionality such as the Sasso di Simone and the nearby Simoncello.

=== Seismicity ===
Historically, Valtiberina has a medium-high level of seismicity. Among the earthquakes of the past, the strongest with ML between 5 and 6 were those of 1352–1353, 1358, 1389, 1458, 1558, 1694, 1781, 1789, 1917, of 1948, known as the Sansepolcro earthquake. More recently, there have been tremors in 1997 and 2001 with ML slightly higher than 4. In 1997, the shock of 2 October had its epicenter in Sansepolcro. According to legislative provision 3274 of 20 March 2003, the Valtiberina area has been classified as having medium seismic intensity, that is, among those areas in which seismic events, albeit of lesser intensity, can create very serious damage.

=== Climate ===
The climatic classification (ex DPR 412 of 26 August 1993) includes the Valtiberina among the areas of Italy in which it is possible to use natural gas heating in buildings from 15 October to 15 April for 14 hours a day.
