= Montemignaio =

Municipality in Italy

- Comune
- Comune di Montemignaio
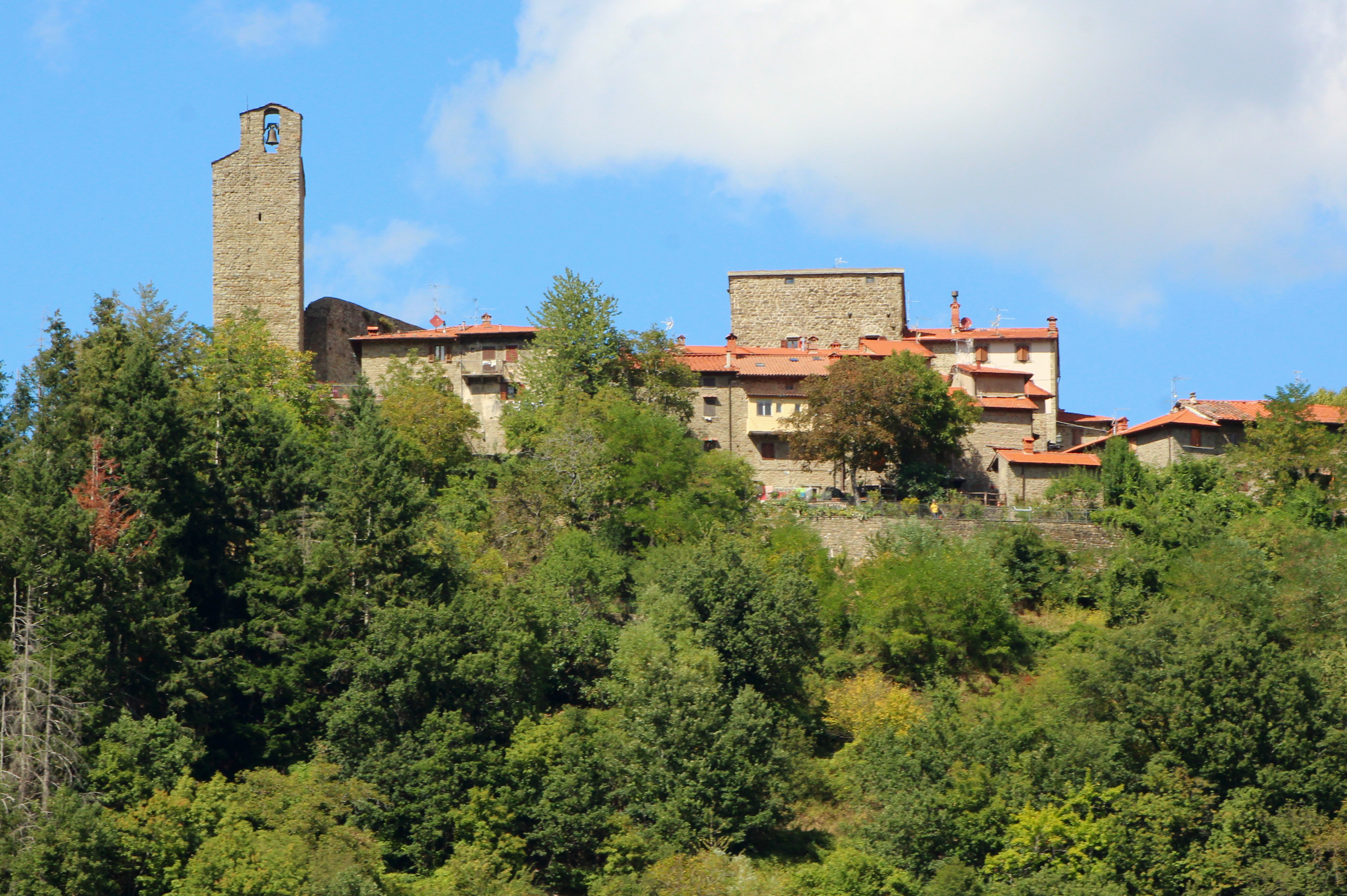
- Church of Santa Maria Assunta

- Coat of arms

- Location within Italy Location within Tuscany
- Coordinates: 43°44′N 11°37′E
- Country: Italy
- Region: Tuscany
- Province: Arezzo (AR)
- Frazioni: Assillo, Brustichino, Cameronci, Campiano, Casodi, Castello, Cerreto, Consuma, Cozzo, Forcanasso, Fornello, Fossatello, La Fonte, Liconia, Masso, Masso Rovinato, Molino, Pieve, Poggiolino, Prato, Santo, Secchieta, Serraia, Treggiaia, Valendaia, Vignola

Government
  - Mayor: Roberto Pertichini

Area
  - Total: 26.1 km^{2} (10.1 sq mi)
- Elevation: 739 m (2,425 ft)

Population (30 November 2017)
  - Total: 546
  - Density: 20.9/km^{2} (54.2/sq mi)
- Demonym: Montemignaiesi
- Time zone: UTC+1 (CET)
  - Summer (DST): UTC+2 (CEST)
- Postal code: 52010
- Dialing code: 0575
- Website: Official website

Montemignaio is a comune (municipality) in the Province of Arezzo in the Italian region Tuscany, located about 30 kilometres (19 mi) east of Florence and about 35 kilometres (22 mi) northwest of Arezzo.

== Geography ==
Montemignaio borders the following municipalities: Castel San Niccolò, Pelago, Pratovecchio, Reggello, Rufina.

== Sights ==
- Castello di Montemignaio
