= Subbiano =

- Comune
- Comune di Subbiano
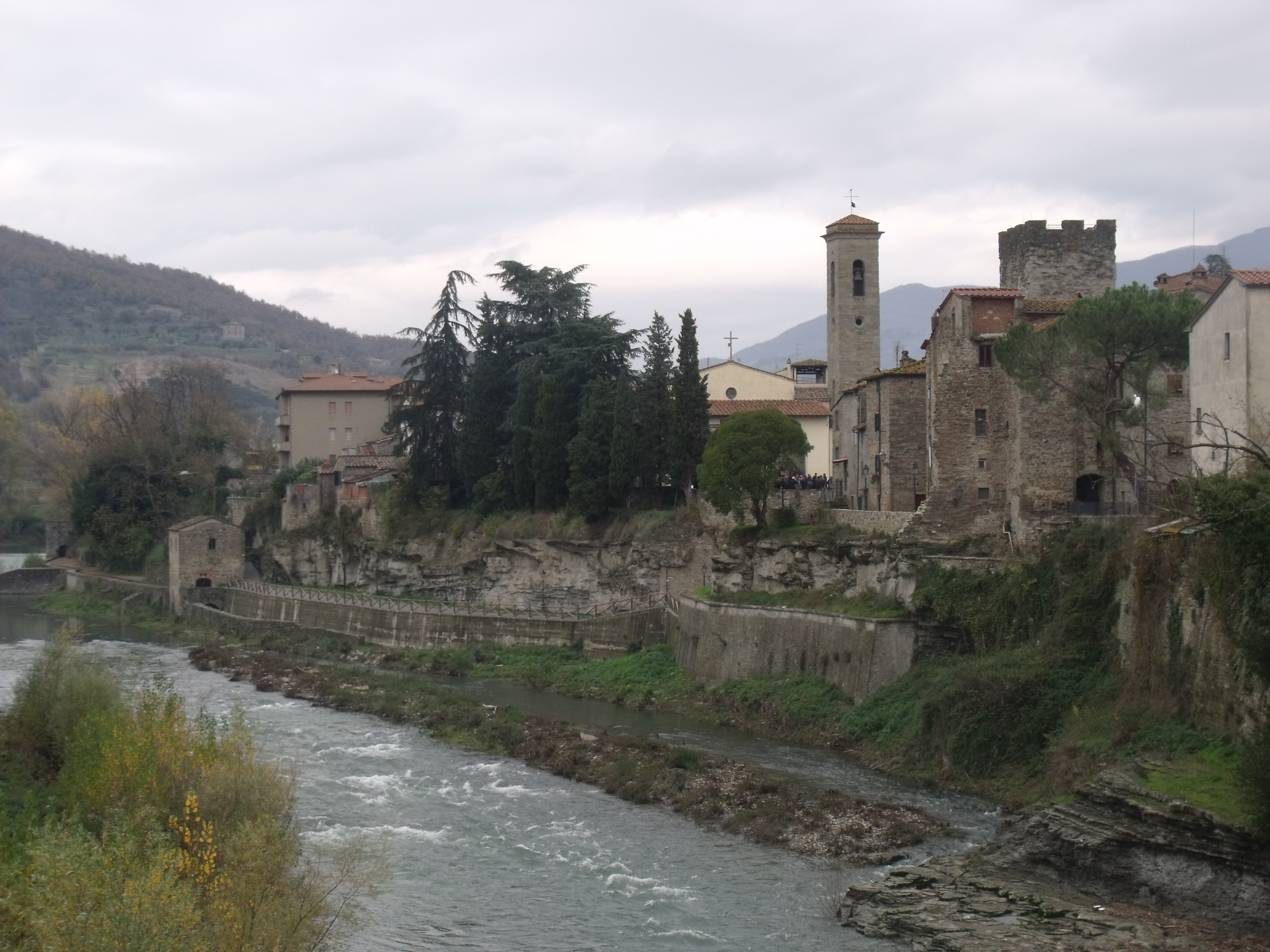
- Panorama of Subbiano

- Location within Italy Location within Tuscany
- Coordinates: 43°34′48″N 11°52′20″E
- Country: Italy
- Region: Tuscany
- Province: Arezzo (AR)
- Frazioni: Calbenzano, Casa la Marga, Chiaveretto, Castelnuovo, MonteGiovi, Falciano, Poggio d’Acona, Santa Mama, Savorgnano, Vogognano, Giuliano

Government
  - Mayor: Antonio De Bari (since May 2014)

Area
  - Total: 78.25 km^{2} (30.21 sq mi)
- Elevation: 266 m (873 ft)

Population (1 January 2016)
  - Total: 6,331
  - Density: 80.91/km^{2} (209.5/sq mi)
- Demonym: Subbianesi
- Time zone: UTC+1 (CET)
  - Summer (DST): UTC+2 (CEST)
- Postal code: 52010
- Dialing code: 0575
- Patron saint: Visitation of the Holy Virgin Mary
- Saint day: 31 May
- Website: Official website

Subbiano is a small town and comune (municipality) in the province of Arezzo, Tuscany, central Italy, on the left bank of the River Arno.

It is adjacent to the north of Arezzo, and south of Bibbiena. Other neighbouring municipalities include Anghiari (east) and Capolona (west) and Sansepolcro (also east).
