= Caprese Michelangelo =

Village in Tuscany, Italy

- Comune
- Comune di Caprese Michelangelo
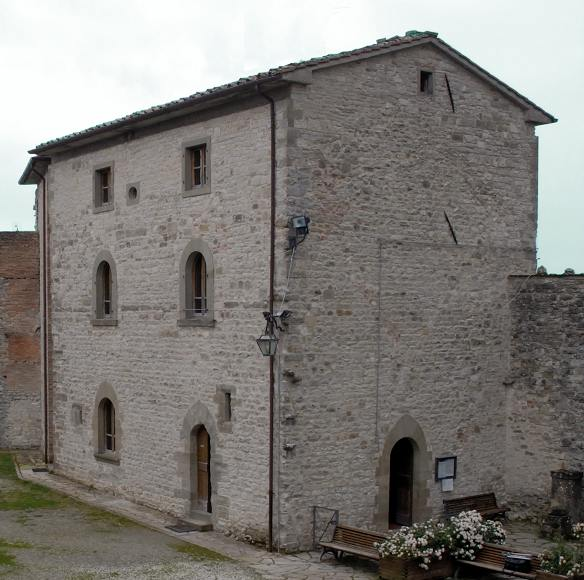
- Michelangelo Museum

- Coat of arms

- Location within Italy Location within Tuscany
- Coordinates: 43°38′N 11°59′E
- Country: Italy
- Region: Tuscany
- Province: Arezzo (AR)
- Frazioni: Casalino di Caprese, Dicciano, Fragaiolo, Gregnano, Lama, Monna, San Cristoforo, Papiano, Ponte Singerna, San Casciano, Selva Perugina, Sovaggio, Trecciano, Valboncione.

Government
  - Mayor: Marida Brogialdi

Area
  - Total: 66.53 km^{2} (25.69 sq mi)
- Elevation: 653 m (2,142 ft)

Population (31 May 2017)
  - Total: 1,395
  - Density: 20.97/km^{2} (54.31/sq mi)
- Demonym: Capresani
- Time zone: UTC+1 (CET)
  - Summer (DST): UTC+2 (CEST)
- Postal code: 52033
- Dialing code: 0575
- Patron saint: St. John the Baptist
- Saint day: June 24
- Website: Official website

Caprese Michelangelo is a village and comune in the province of Arezzo, Tuscany, Italy. It is the birthplace of the Renaissance artist Michelangelo. The village is roughly 100 kilometres (62 mi) east of Florence. The village is situated in the Valtiberina or High Tiber Valley.

Sights include the 13th-century church of St. John the Baptist, where Michelangelo was baptized; the ancient churches of San Cristoforo a Monna, San Paolo a Monna and Santi Ippolito and Cassiano; the abbey of San Martino a Tifi; the Michelangelo Museum and Library.
