= Capolona =

- Comune
- Comune di Capolona
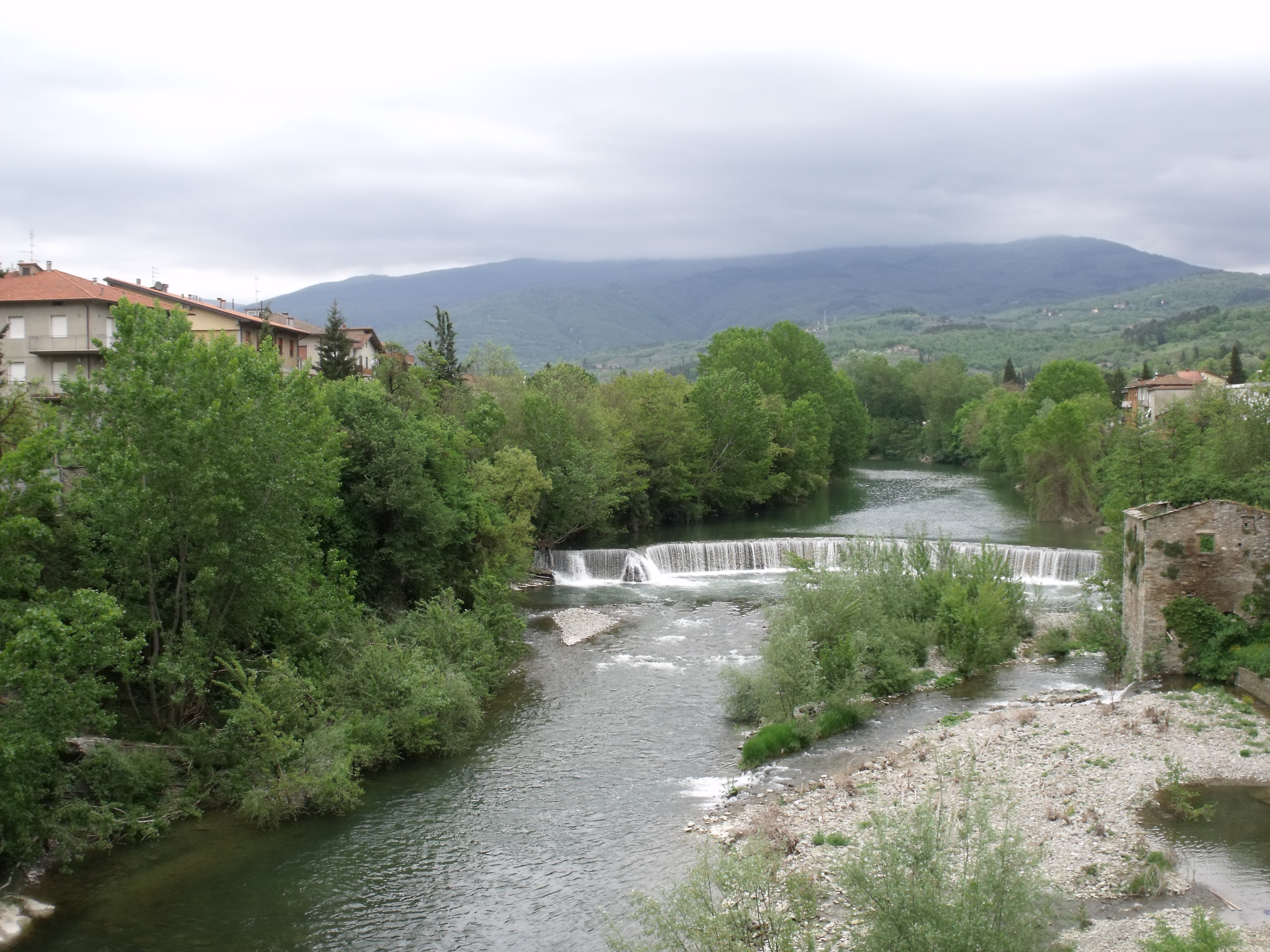
- View of Capolona

- Coat of arms

- Location within Italy Location within Tuscany
- Coordinates: 43°34′N 11°51′E
- Country: Italy
- Region: Tuscany
- Province: Arezzo (AR)

Government
  - Mayor: Alberto Ciolfi (since May 2013)

Area
  - Total: 47 km^{2} (18 sq mi)
- Elevation: 263 m (863 ft)

Population (31 December 2004)
  - Total: 4,807
  - Density: 100/km^{2} (260/sq mi)
- Time zone: UTC+1 (CET)
  - Summer (DST): UTC+2 (CEST)
- Postal code: 52010
- Dialing code: 0575
- Patron saint: St. Peter
- Saint day: 7 April
- Website: Official website

Capolona is a small town and comune in Tuscany, central Italy, on the right bank of the River Arno. It is adjacent to Arezzo, the capital of the province of the same name.

== Geography ==
The commune lies between 207 and 720 metres (679 and 2,362 ft) above sea level.

== Economy ==
The workforce in Capolona is made up of 1,892 workers, 39.40% of the residents of the Commune.

Industrial firms account for 57.77% of the employment work force in Capolona with 185 firms employing 1,093 persons. The next largest sector is the administrative sector, providing 272 jobs (14.38% of the workforce) in 16 offices. The third largest employer is the service industry. 104 firms employ 178 persons, employing 9.41% of the work force.

== History ==
Capolona was originally known as Campus Leonis or Caput leonis. In 943, a deed of confirmation mentions Campus Leonis as being the property of a Bernardo, a noble of Arezzo. The name Campus Leonis was later corrupted to Capolona.

The core of Capolona grew around the Abbey of San Gennaro in Campo Leonis. The Abbey was founded in 972 by the Marquis Ugo di Toscana and his wife Giuditta. It was placed under the protection of Emperors Otto III, Carrado II and Arrigo III who gave the Abbey jurisdiction over several of the castles and courts in the diocese of Arezzo.

In 1241, the Arezzo military besieged Capolona and destroyed it. The Abbott was forced to surrender all the castles and lands under control of the Abbey. Their ownership was passed to the municipality. These were in turn passed to the dominion of the Tarlati di Pietramala, in 1384, after the Arezzo territories surrendered to Firenze, becoming part of the Fiorentino Republic.

In 1527, Capolona was devastated by the army of Carlo di Borbone, General of the Emperor Carlos V.

The Commune of Capolona was formed in 1845 when the hamlets of Lorenzano and Baciano were combined with several areas which had been part of the municipality of Talla.
