= Talla, Arezzo =

Talla
- Comune
- Comune di Talla
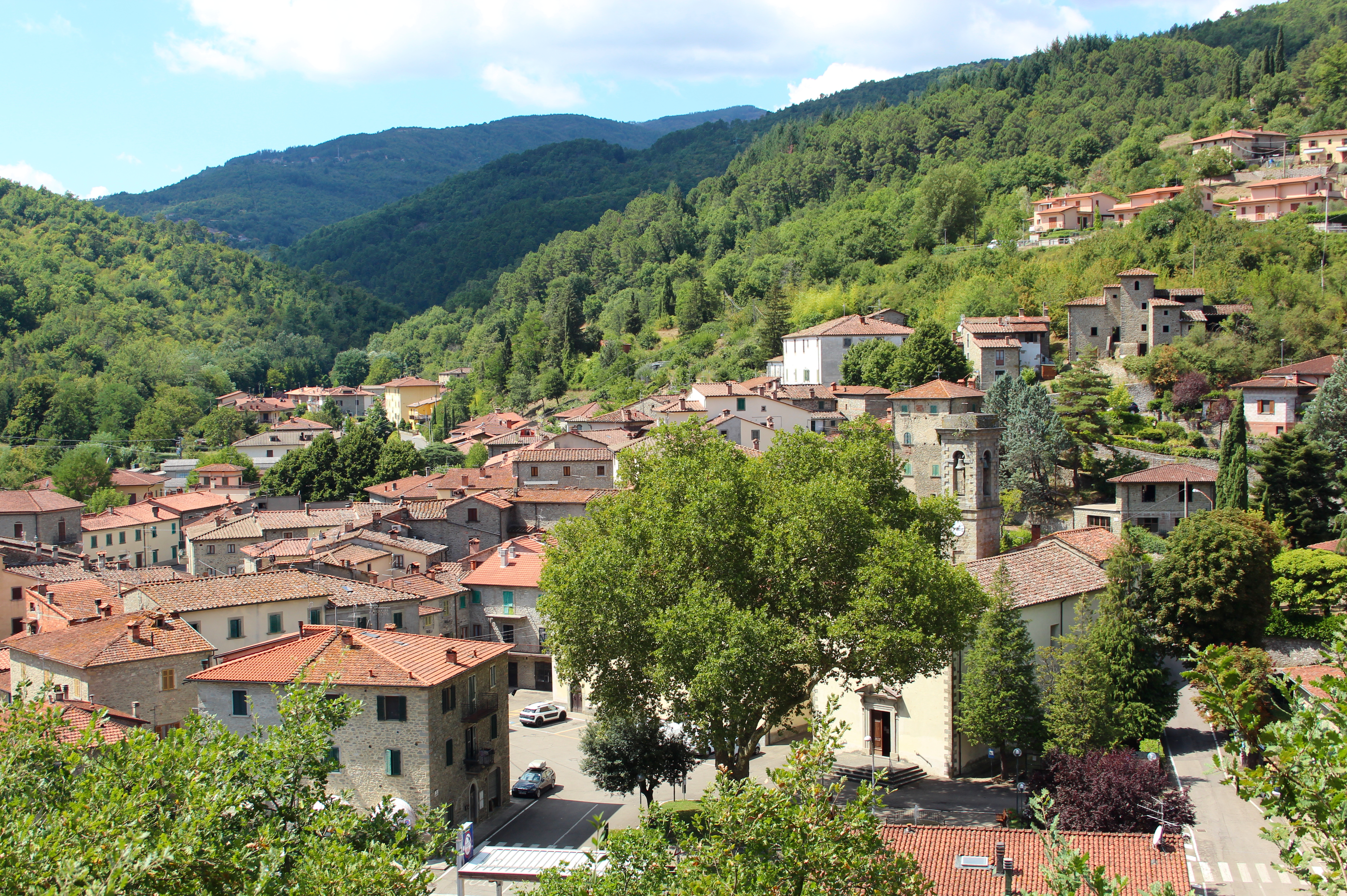
- View of Talla

- Coat of arms

- Location within Italy Location within Tuscany
- Coordinates: 43°36′10″N 11°47′17″E
- Country: Italy
- Region: Tuscany
- Province: Arezzo (AR)
- Frazioni: Bicciano, Capraia, Faltona, Pieve di Pontenano, Pontenano, Santo-Bagnena

Area
  - Total: 60.05 km^{2} (23.19 sq mi)
- Elevation: 348 m (1,142 ft)

Population (2005)
  - Total: 1,170
  - Density: 19.5/km^{2} (50.5/sq mi)
- Demonym: Tallesi
- Time zone: UTC+1 (CET)
  - Summer (DST): UTC+2 (CEST)
- Postal code: 52010
- Dialing code: 0575
- ISTAT code: 051038
- Saint day: 6 December
- Website: Official website

Talla is a town and comune in the province of Arezzo, Tuscany (Italy).
