= Province of Arezzo =

Province of Italy

Coordinates: 43°28′24″N 11°52′12″E

Province of Arezzo Provincia di Arezzo (Italian)
- Province
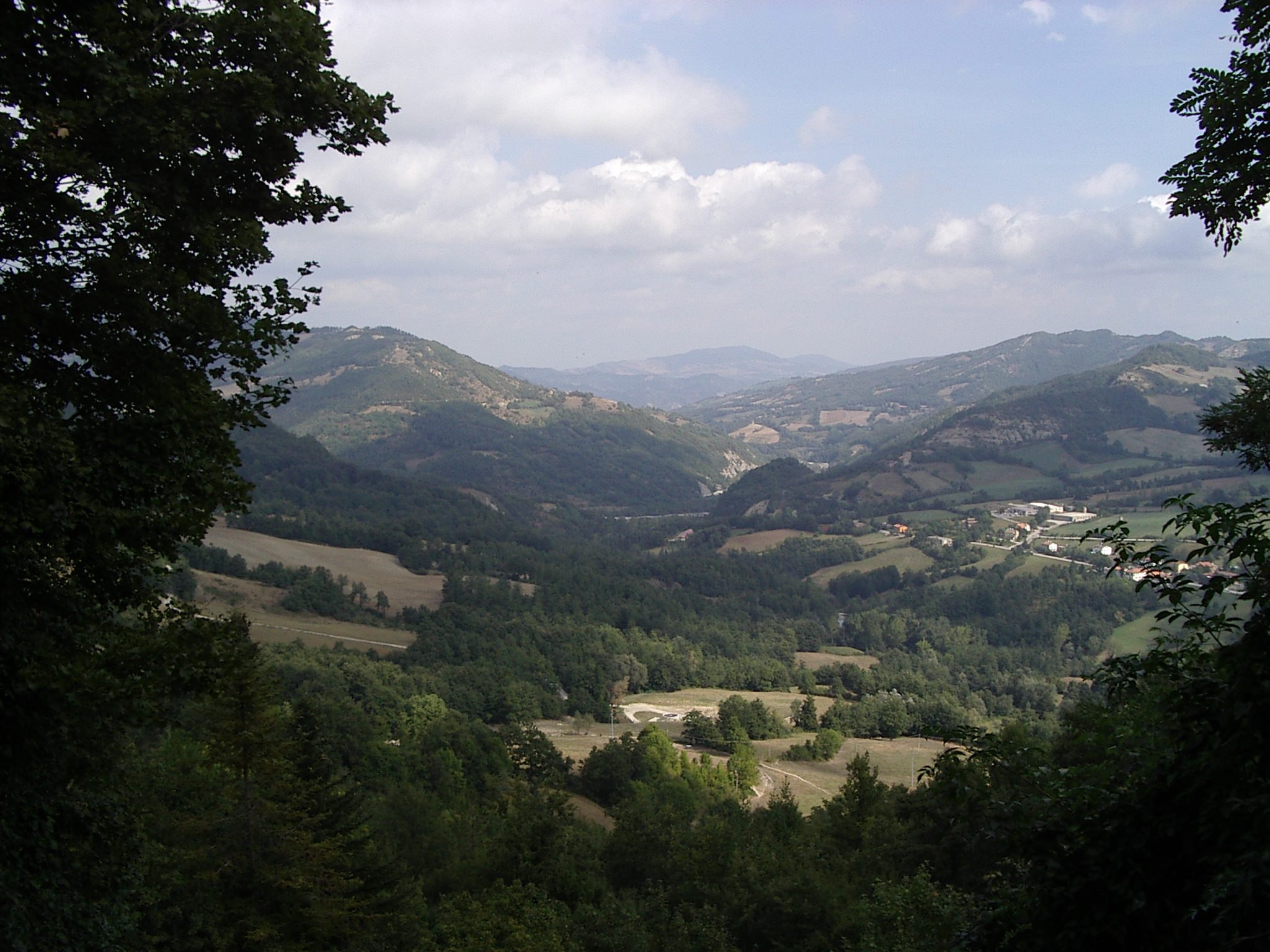
- Valmarecchia

- Flag Coat of arms

- Location of the province of Arezzo in Italy
- Country: Italy
- Region: Tuscany
- Capital(s): Arezzo
- Municipalities: 36

Government
  - President: Alessandro Polcri

Area
  - Total: 3,233.08 km^{2} (1,248.30 sq mi)

Population (2026)
  - Total: 333,269
  - Density: 103.081/km^{2} (266.978/sq mi)

GDP
  - Total: €9.445 billion (2015)
  - Per capita: €27,315 (2015)
- Time zone: UTC+1 (CET)
  - Summer (DST): UTC+2 (CEST)
- Postal code: n/a
- Telephone prefix: n/a
- Vehicle registration: AR
- ISTAT code: 051

The province of Arezzo (Italian: provincia di Arezzo) is a province in the region of Tuscany in central Italy. Its capital is the city of Arezzo. The province is bordered by the regions of Marche, Emilia-Romagna, Umbria, and the provinces Siena and Florence of Tuscany. It has a population of 333,269 in an area of 3,233.08 square kilometres (1,248.30 mi^{2}) across its 36 municipalities.

The north of the province of Arezzo contains the Pratomagno and Casentino mountain ranges and valleys, and the southern areas of the region contain the fertile Tiber and Chiana valleys.

The Romito di Laterina, the bridge in the background of the Mona Lisa, is located in the province of Arezzo, in the municipality of Laterina.

== History ==
The province capital Arezzo was a major Etruscan urban centre known as Aritim, and a wall was built around the province in this period of rule. In Roman times, the settlement was given the Latinized name Arretium and expanded down from the hills. Arretium assisted Ancient Rome in the Punic Wars against Ancient Carthage. After attacks from barbarians, the settlement mostly disappeared in around 400 AD.

Towards the end of the 11th century, the settlement grew again into a city, despite being located near the powerful nations of Siena and Florence. Its location led to its ownership changing repeatedly; Florence owned the province after the Battle of Campaldino, later lost authority over it, and then annexed it again in 1384. Florence possessed the province until 1859, when Tuscany was annexed to the Kingdom of Sardinia during the Risorgimento. The province is in close proximity to Camaldoli, ancestral seat of the Camaldolese monks.

== Government ==
=== Municipalities ===
The province has 36 municipalities:

- Anghiari
- Arezzo
- Badia Tedalda
- Bibbiena
- Bucine
- Capolona
- Caprese Michelangelo
- Castel Focognano
- Castel San Niccolò
- Castelfranco Piandiscò
- Castiglion Fibocchi
- Castiglion Fiorentino
- Cavriglia
- Chitignano
- Chiusi della Verna
- Civitella in Val di Chiana
- Cortona
- Foiano della Chiana
- Laterina Pergine Valdarno
- Loro Ciuffenna
- Lucignano
- Marciano della Chiana
- Monte San Savino
- Montemignaio
- Monterchi
- Montevarchi
- Ortignano Raggiolo
- Pieve Santo Stefano
- Poppi
- Pratovecchio Stia
- San Giovanni Valdarno
- Sansepolcro
- Sestino
- Subbiano
- Talla
- Terranuova Bracciolini

== Demographics ==
Historical population
Year	Pop.	±%
1861	221,815	—
1871	237,522	+7.1%
1881	239,588	+0.9%
1901	272,403	+13.7%
1911	288,951	+6.1%
1921	305,189	+5.6%
1931	313,298	+2.7%
1936	319,754	+2.1%
1951	329,665	+3.1%
1961	308,964	−6.3%
1971	306,340	−0.8%
1981	313,157	+2.2%
1991	314,564	+0.4%
2001	323,288	+2.8%
2011	343,676	+6.3%
2021	334,926	−2.5%
Source: ISTAT

As of 2026, the population is 333,269, of which 49.3% are male, and 50.7% are female. Minors make up 13.6% of the population, and seniors make up 27.2%.

=== Immigration ===
As of 2025, immigrants make up 14.3% of the total population. The 5 largest foreign countries of birth are Romania, Albania, Bangladesh, Pakistan, and India.
