= Castelfranco Piandiscò =

- Comune
- Comune di Castelfranco Piandiscò
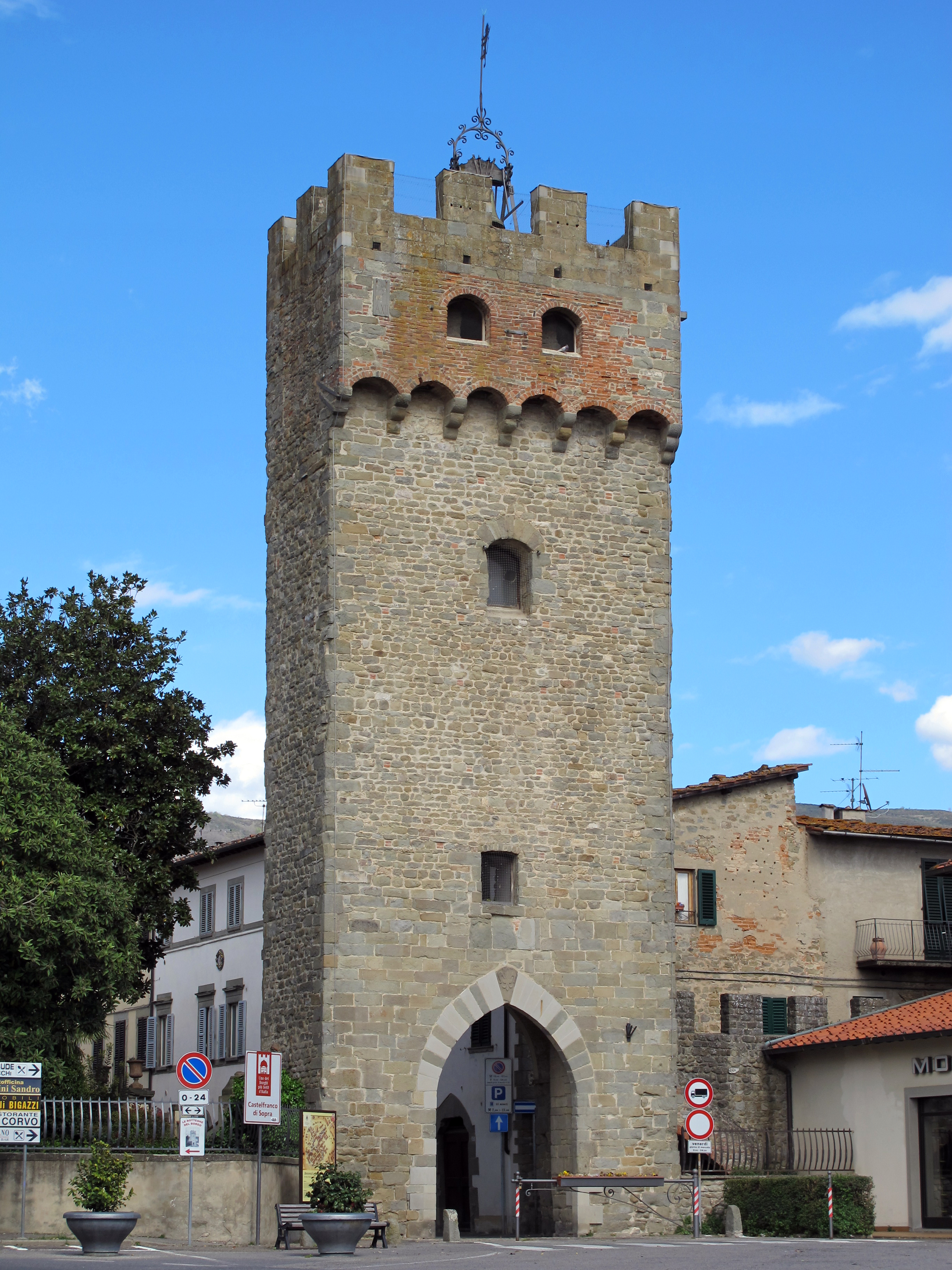
- View of Castelfranco di Sopra

- Location within Italy Location within Tuscany
- Coordinates: 43°37′25″N 11°33′30″E
- Country: Italy
- Region: Tuscany
- Province: Arezzo (AR)
- Frazioni: Casabiondo, Caspri, Castelfranco di Sopra, Certignano, Faella, Lama, Matassino, Pian di Scò, Pulicciano, Vaggio

Government
  - Mayor: Enzo Cacioli

Area
  - Total: 55.96 km^{2} (21.61 sq mi)
- Elevation: 281 m (922 ft)

Population (30 september 2013)
  - Total: 9,516
  - Density: 170.1/km^{2} (440.4/sq mi)
- Time zone: UTC+1 (CET)
  - Summer (DST): UTC+2 (CEST)
- Postal code: 52026
- Dialing code: 055
- Patron saint: St. Philip Neri
- Saint day: 26 May
- Website: Official website

Castelfranco Piandiscò is a municipality (comune) in the province of Arezzo, Tuscany, central Italy. It was created on 1 January 2014 from the merger of previous comuni of Castelfranco di Sopra and Pian di Scò.

It is located about 30 kilometres (19 mi) southeast of Florence and about 30 kilometres (19 mi) northwest of Arezzo.
