= Castel Focognano =

- Comune
- Comune di Castel Focognano
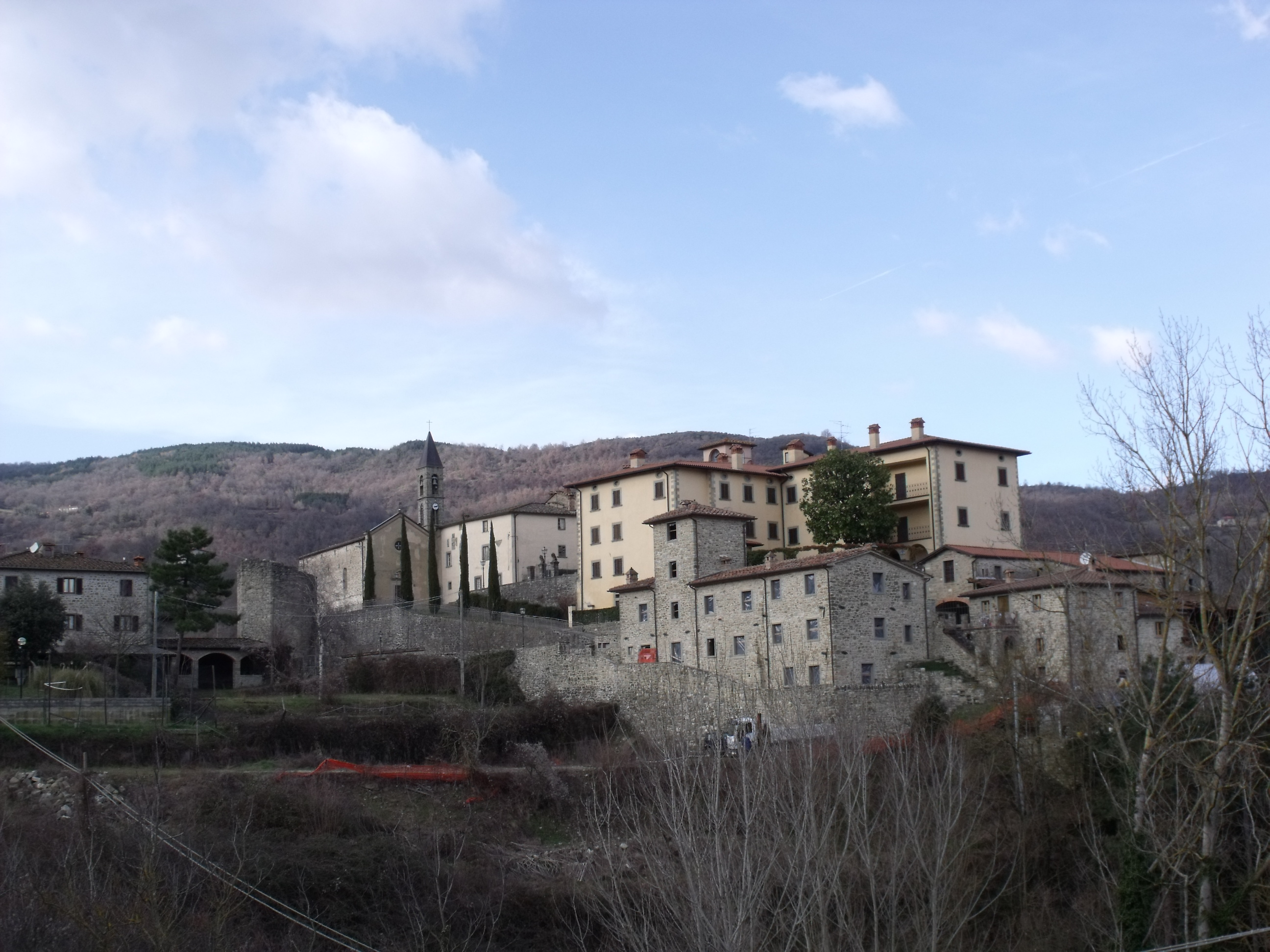
- Panorama of Castel Focognano

- Coat of arms

- Location within Italy Location within Tuscany
- Coordinates: 43°39′14″N 11°50′14″E
- Country: Italy
- Region: Tuscany
- Province: Arezzo (AR)
- Frazioni: Rassina (capital), Calleta, Carda, Castel Focognano, Ornina, Pieve a Socana, Salutio, Zenna

Government
  - Mayor: Lorenzo "Remo" Ricci

Area
  - Total: 56.63 km^{2} (21.86 sq mi)
- Elevation: 310 m (1,020 ft)

Population (31 May 2017)
  - Total: 3,102
  - Density: 54.78/km^{2} (141.9/sq mi)
- Demonym: Focognanesi or Rassinesi
- Time zone: UTC+1 (CET)
  - Summer (DST): UTC+2 (CEST)
- Postal code: 52016
- Dialing code: 0575
- Patron saint: St. Martin of Tours
- Saint day: 11 November
- Website: Official website

Castel Focognano is a comune in the province of Arezzo, Tuscany, central Italy.

The comune lies in the Casentino valley on the left bank of the River Arno. Although it is named after a pictoresque village on the slopes of the Alpe di Catenaia, the municipal seat is in the industrial town of Rassina.

== History ==
During World War II Rassina was home for many American soldiers who were hiding or preparing the offensive on the German army.

Many people were killed while fighting with Fascist soldiers.

In 1992 Rassina was completely flooded by the Arno river.

== Economy ==
Rassina is one of Casentino's leading industrial centres, home to one of Europe's largest cement works.

== Sister cities ==
- Champcevinel, France, since 1992
