= Santissima Annunziata, Lucignano =

Church in Lucignano, Italy

Coordinates: 43°19′52.4″N 11°43′31.6″E

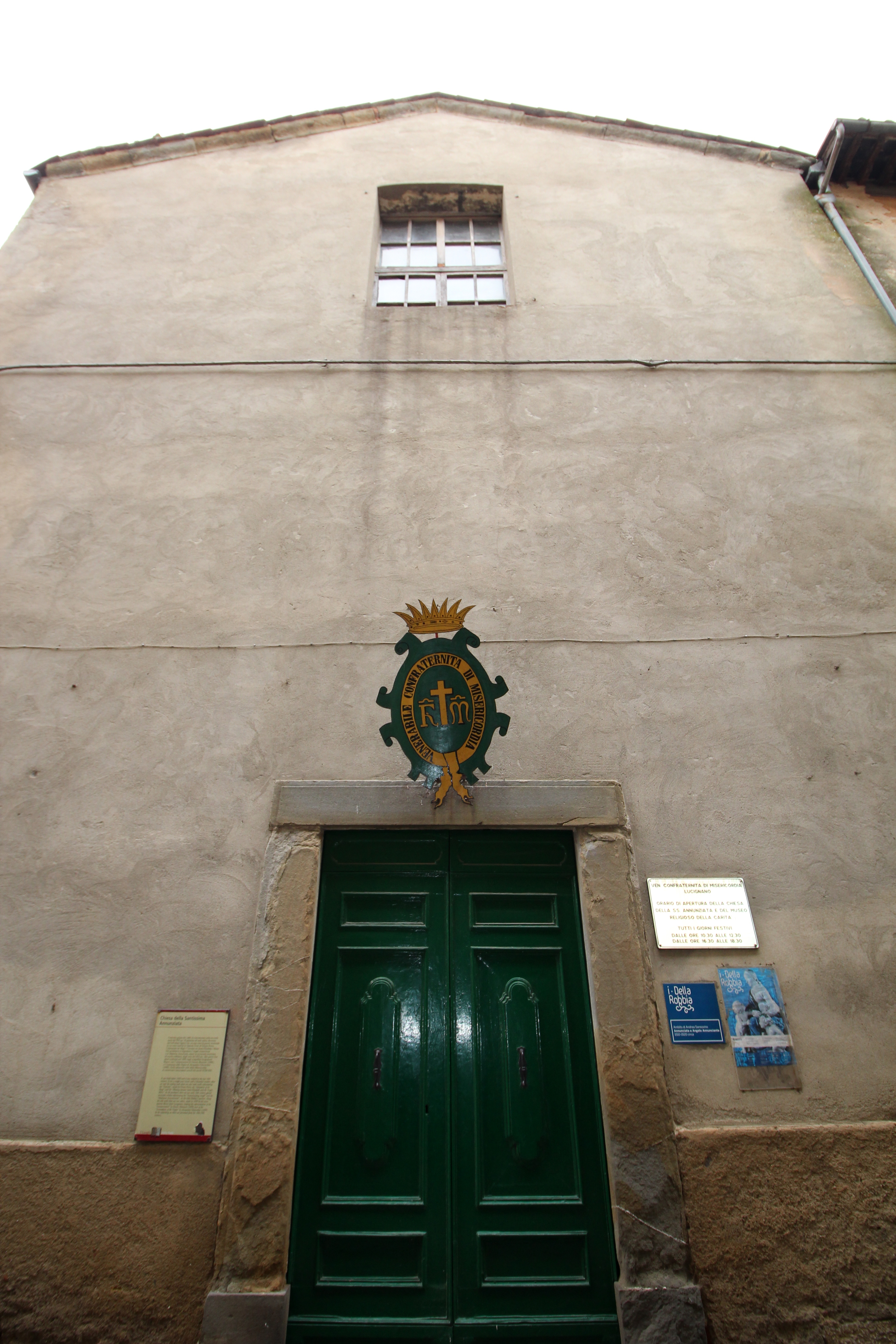
The facade of the church

The Chiesa della Santissima Annunziata, also once called the Chiesa della Misericordia, is a Renaissance-style Roman Catholic church located in the town of Lucignano, Province of Arezzo, region of Tuscany, Italy.

The church was built in 1468 as an oratory for the Company of the Battenti Neri, a fraternity of flagellants. That company was suppressed under the Granduke Leopold in the 1780s, and substituted by the Compagnia di Carità, then by the present Venerabile Arciconfraternita di Misericordia, whose coat of arms is on the portal.

The unpolished stone facade is simple. The gilded main altar dates from 1583. Inside there are a number of works of art of the following two centuries, including a Nativity attributed to Orazio Porta, and terra-cotta reliefs of the Annunciation by the studio of Andrea della Robbia. In addition there is an altarpiece depicting the Annunciation by Onorio Marinari, and the Glory of the Virgin by Alessandro Gherardini.
