= San Biagio, Lucignano =

Church in Pieve Vecchia, Italy

Coordinates: 43°16′27.56″N 11°45′56.89″E

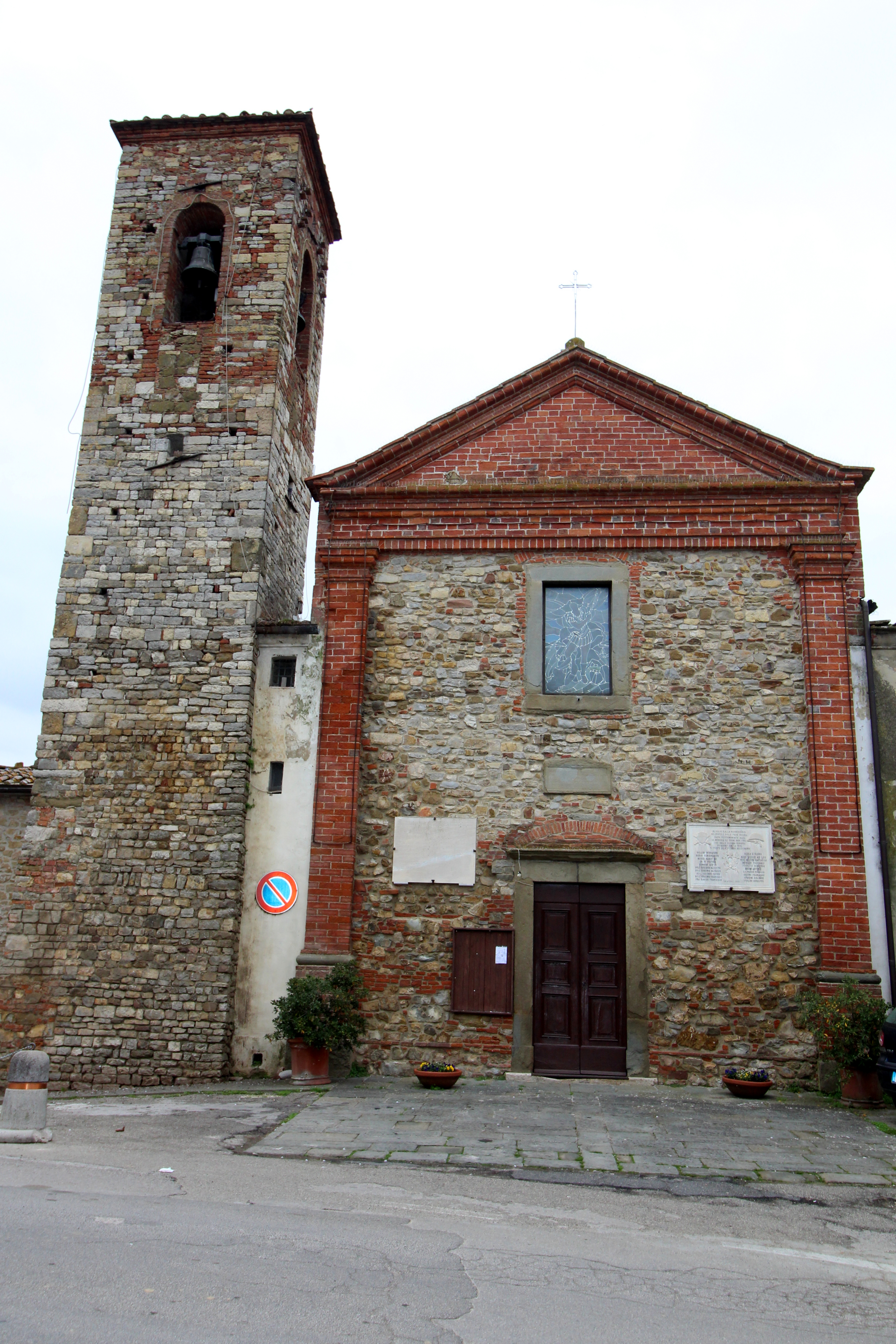
Facade and bell-tower

San Biagio is a Roman Catholic church located in Pieve Vecchia, hamlet of Lucignano, region of Tuscany, Italy. It stands near by the church of the Misericordia in town.

== History ==
The church was initially the parish church of Lucignano, dedicated to San Felice, and erected in 1016. Of this building, only the bell-tower remains. It was rebuilt in 1468, and again in the 16th century. The main altar is made of wood and contains decorations depicting the Nativity, the Adoration of the Magi, and the Visitation of Elizabeth and Mary by Orazio Porta. In the presbytery is a terracotta depicting the Annunciation of a design attributed to Andrea Sansovino. Along the walls are altars with stucco work (1694) by the Bracci family, and an Annunciation (1699) by Onorio Marinari and an Assumption of the Virgin (1699) by Alessandro Gherardini.
