= Collegiata di San Michele Arcangelo, Lucignano =

Roman Catholic church in Tuscany, Italy

Coordinates: 43°16′27″N 11°44′44″E

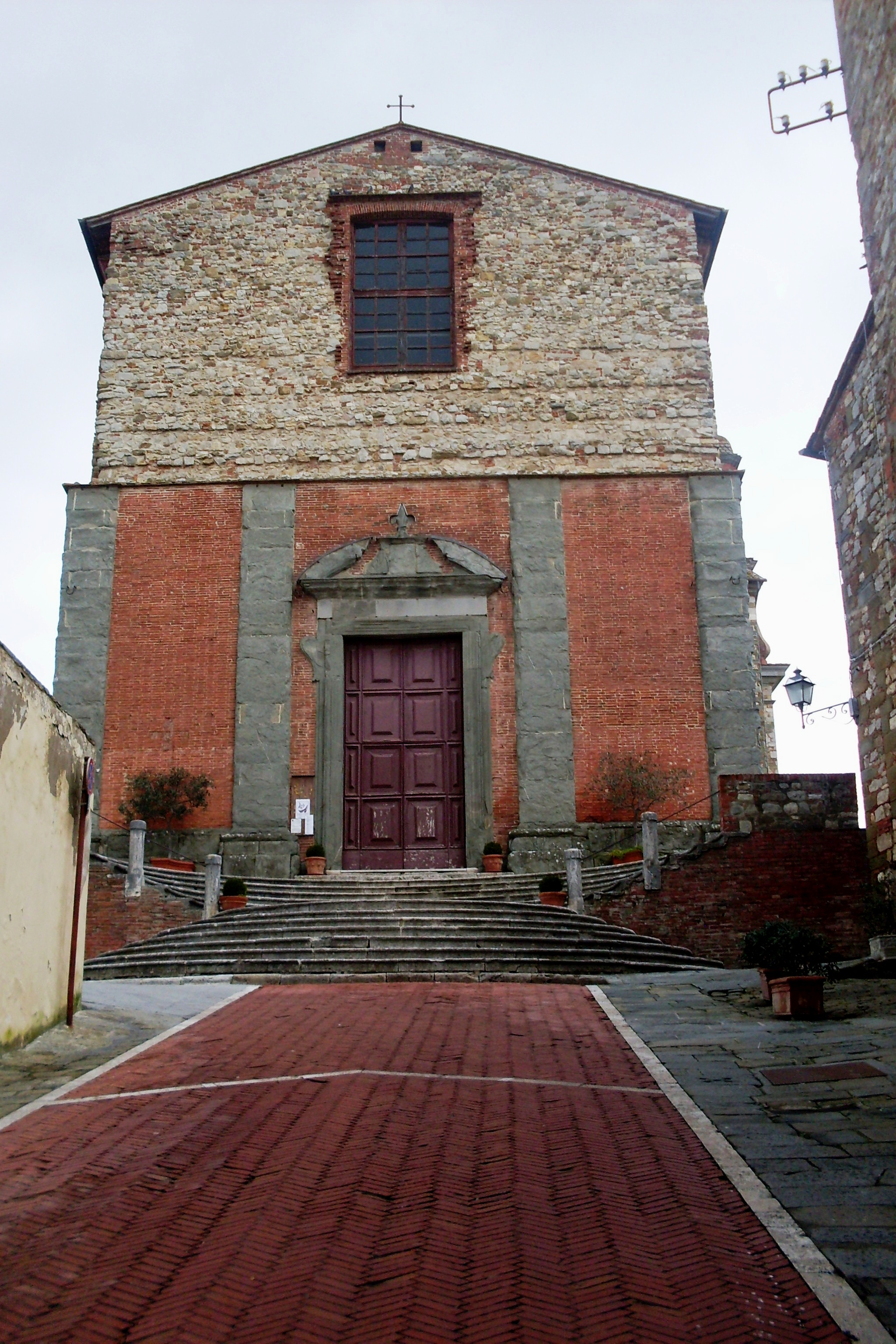
Facade and entrance stairs

The Collegiata di San Michele Arcangelo is Renaissance-style Roman Catholic church located on Via San Giuseppe #1, at one end of the Piazza del Tribunale, in the town of Lucignano, Province of Arezzo, region of Tuscany, Italy.

== History ==
This collegiate church was designed by Orazio Porta, and built at the site of an ancient castle destroyed during the Florentine-Sienese conflict of 1556. Attached to the castle had been an oratory dedicated to St Michael Archangel. The ruins of the fortress were used to construct this church. The scenographic, baroque, travertine marble stairs, with convex followed by concave levels were designed in 1712 by the Jesuit architect and painter Andrea Pozzo. Only the lower half of the facade was partially complete with brick. Nearly all the stone except for the portal (1715), in pietra serena, remains rough.

The interior houses main altar dedicated to Saints Peter and Paul by Andrea Pozzo. It holds two altarpieces: a Visitation (1631) by Matteo Rosselli and a Glory of St Joseph (1668-1670) by Onorio Marinari. Other works include a St Carlo Borromeo visits those afflicted with plague (1661) and a Martyrdom of St Lucy (1665) by Giacinto Gimignani; a Martyrdom of St Lawrence (1650) by Carpoforo Tencalla (1650); a Last Supper (1615) attributed to Rutilio Manetti; and an Adoration of the Magi (1812) by Luigi Ademollo. The Chapel of the Holy Sacrament has a putatively miraculous 14th-century crucifix, once found in the church of Santa Margherita. This chapel was refurbished by Luigi Ademollo.
