= Italian union of thermal-fluid dynamics =

UIT
- Italian Union of Thermal-Fluid Dynamics
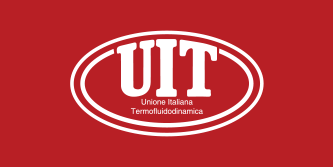
- Formation: 1 December 1984
- Type: Nonprofit organization
- Purpose: Research promotion in the field of thermal-fluid dynamics
- Headquarters: Parma (Italy)
- President: Sara Rainieri
- Website: https://www.uitonline.it/

The Italian Union of Thermal-fluid Dynamics (acronym UIT) is a nonprofit scientific association of persons or entities interested in research and technological applications in the field of thermal-fluid dynamics; the main objective of the association is the promotion of the scientific and technological research in this field.

== History ==
Between 1982 and 1983, on the initiative of Prof. Enrico Lorenzini, a group of university professors founded an association dedicated to the advanced study of the fundamentals and applications of heat transfer. The Association, initially called ATA - Associazione Termotecnica Avanzata (Advanced Thermotechnical Association), held its first Congress in Trieste (Italy) in June 1983. The name was later changed to Unione Italiana di Termofluidodinamica (Italian Union of Thermal-Fluid Dynamics) and the next Congress, in Bologna (Italy) in 1984, was the first under the name UIT.

UIT was formally founded on December 1, 1984, in Bologna; the founding members were Gaetano Alfano, Vittorio Betta, Maurizio Cumo, Giovanni De Comelli, Giovanni Del Tin, Sergio Faggiani, Enrico Lorenzini, Elio Oliveri, Claudio Pisoni, Sandro Salvigni and Giorgio Sotgia. The first president was Enrico Lorenzini.

== Organization ==
The main constitutional bodies of the UIT are the members' assembly, the steering committee, the president, the auditors, and the secretary. The members' assembly meets at least once a year, normally during the annual congress. The steering committee, consisting of seven members elected by the assembly, elects one of its members as president and, upon the president's proposal, appoints the vice-president and secretary. The steering committee holds office for three years and its members may be re-elected without limitation; the president, vice-president and secretary can not serve more than two consecutive terms. The board of auditors, also elected by the assembly, consists of three members who hold office for three years and may be re-elected.

== Honorary and distinguished members ==
According to Art. 4 of the statute, honorary members are "those eminent persons in the field of thermal-fluid dynamics to whom the association pays special tribute. Appointment as Honorary Members must be approved by the Executive Committee on its own initiative or on the proposal of at least 1/3 of the members and must be ratified by the Assembly". The honorary members of the UIT are: Arthur E. Bergles, Michael W. Collins, Marino Di Marzo, Frank P. Incropera, Antonio C.M. Sousa.

Distinguished members are the founding members and "those members who, on the proposal of at least five members, are proclaimed as such by the Assembly for their significant contribution to the development of the Union". The UIT's distinguished members are: Maurizio Cumo, Giovanni del Tin, Sergio Faggiani, Enrico Lorenzini, Elio Oliveri, Claudio Pisoni, Sandro Salvigni, Giorgio Sotgia, who were joined by Gian Piero Celata (2013), Vincenzo Naso (2023) and Giovanni Sebastiano Barozzi (2024).

== Activities ==
UIT promotes the advancement of knowledge in the field of thermal-fluid dynamics by organizing congresses, seminars and schools, publishing scientific material and awarding prizes.

=== Congresses and Seminars ===
The organization of the international heat transfer congress is one of the UIT's main activities. The congress is held annually, usually in the second half of June, and takes place at a different Italian university venue each year

In addition to collaborating with other institutions in organizing congresses in the field, UIT also organizes seminars on specific topics, often aimed at non-specialists. Examples of topics include recent developments in refrigerants and heat pipes.

=== UIT Summer School ===
Since 1997, UIT has organized the Summer School of Thermal-fluid Dynamics, biannually from 1997 to 2005 and then annually from 2006 to 2018. Because of the difficulties due to the COVID-19 pandemic, the cadence returned to biannual from 2022. The School is mainly aimed at PhD students and post-docs, is residential in nature and lasts one week. The lecturers are experts in the field from Italy and abroad. All UIT Summer Schools have been held at the Certosa di Pontignano, near Siena (Italy). Examples of topics covered in recent Schools are the theoretical and experimental study of turbulence, experimental techniques in heat transfer and multiphase flows.

=== Publications ===
Since 1983, UIT has published the Proceedings of its annual congresses. Starting with the 2013 congress, a large selection of the papers presented is published online open access in the Journal of Physics: Conference Series of IOP Publishing.

The UIT Bulletin, sent to all Members, was published between 1994 (November, 'issue 0') and 2010 (April) with varying periodicity. Editor-in-Chief of the Bulletin was Gian Piero Celata.

=== Awards ===
The UIT prizes, awarded by special committees appointed by the Members' Assembly, consist of a plaque, a sum of money and UIT membership for one year. They are traditionally presented during the opening ceremony of the annual congress.

==== UIT Prize for the best master's thesis in the field of thermal-fluid dynamics ====
Every year since 1996, UIT has awarded this prize reserved for master's theses discussed at an Italian university in the previous year.

==== UIT Prize for the best PhD's thesis in the field of thermal-fluid dynamics ====
Since 2001, every two years, UIT has awarded this prize reserved for doctoral theses discussed at an Italian university in the previous two years.

== International relations ==
UIT is linked and collaborates with major international organisations in the field, in particular:

- EUROTHERM, European Committee for the Advancement of Thermal Sciences and Heat Transfer
- IMechE, Institution of Mechanical Engineers
- ASME, American Society of Mechanical Engineers
- ASTFE, American Society of Thermal and Fluids Engineers
- ICHMT, International Centre for Heat and Mass Transfer
- JSMF, Japanese Society for Multiphase Flow.

== List of Presidents ==
Name	Affiliation	From	To
Enrico Lorenzini	University of Bologna	1983	1989
Sergio Faggiani	University of Pisa	1990	1998
Claudio Pisoni	University of Genova	1999	2004
Gian Piero Celata	ENEA	2005	2010
Vincenzo Naso	University of Napoli "Federico II"	2011	2016
Alfonso Niro	Polytechnic University of Milano	2017	2022
Sara Rainieri	University of Parma	2023	2028

== See also ==
- American Society of Mechanical Engineers
