= Marciano della Chiana =

- Comune
- Comune di Marciano della Chiana
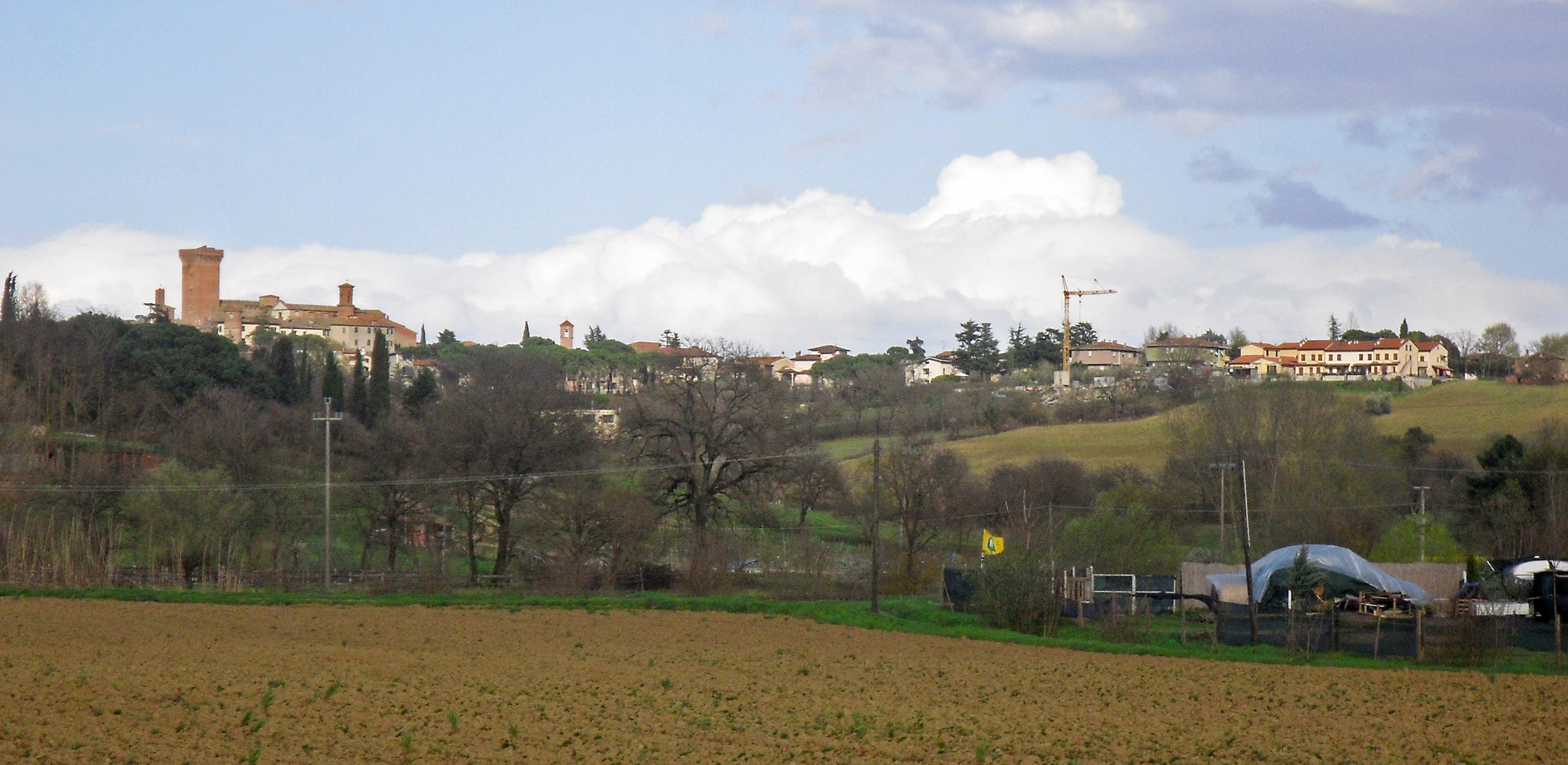
- View of Marciano della Chiana

- Coat of arms

- Location within Italy Location within Tuscany
- Coordinates: 43°18′N 11°47′E
- Country: Italy
- Region: Tuscany
- Province: Arezzo (AR)
- Frazioni: Badicorte, Cesa, San Giovanni dei Mori

Government
  - Mayor: Marco Barbagli

Area
  - Total: 23.7 km^{2} (9.2 sq mi)
- Elevation: 320 m (1,050 ft)

Population (30 September 2017)
  - Total: 3,430
  - Density: 145/km^{2} (375/sq mi)
- Demonym: Marcianesi
- Time zone: UTC+1 (CET)
  - Summer (DST): UTC+2 (CEST)
- Postal code: 52047
- Dialing code: 0575
- Website: Official website

Marciano della Chiana is a comune (municipality) in the Province of Arezzo in the Italian region Tuscany, located about 70 kilometres (43 mi) southeast of Florence and about 20 kilometres (12 mi) southwest of Arezzo.

Marciano della Chiana borders the following municipalities: Arezzo, Castiglion Fiorentino, Foiano della Chiana, Lucignano, Monte San Savino.

The town is of medieval origins, dating to the Lombard domination in Tuscany; later it was acquired by the commune of Arezzo and then by the Republic of Siena. In 1554 it was the seat of the Battle of Marciano (or Scannagallo).
