= San Pietro a Varlungo, Florence =

Church building in Florence, Italy

Church of San Pietro a Varlungo
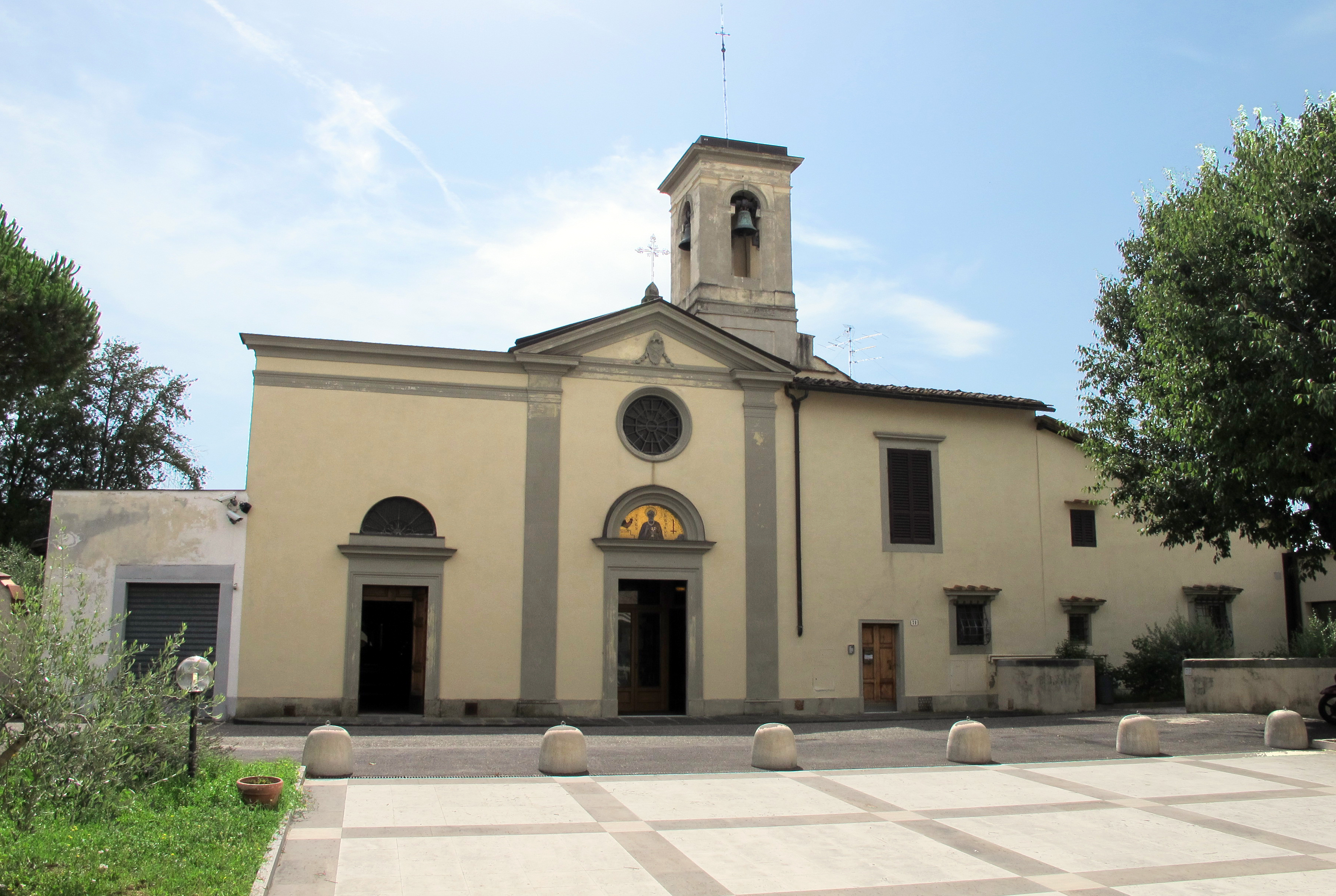
- Facade of the church

Religion
- Affiliation: Roman Catholic
- Province: Florence
- Rite: Roman Rite

Location
- Location: Florence, Tuscany, Italy
- Interactive map of Church of San Pietro a Varlungo
- Coordinates: 43°46′00.8″N 11°17′58.9″E

Architecture
- Type: Church
- Style: Baroque style
- Groundbreaking: 1107
- Completed: 19th Century

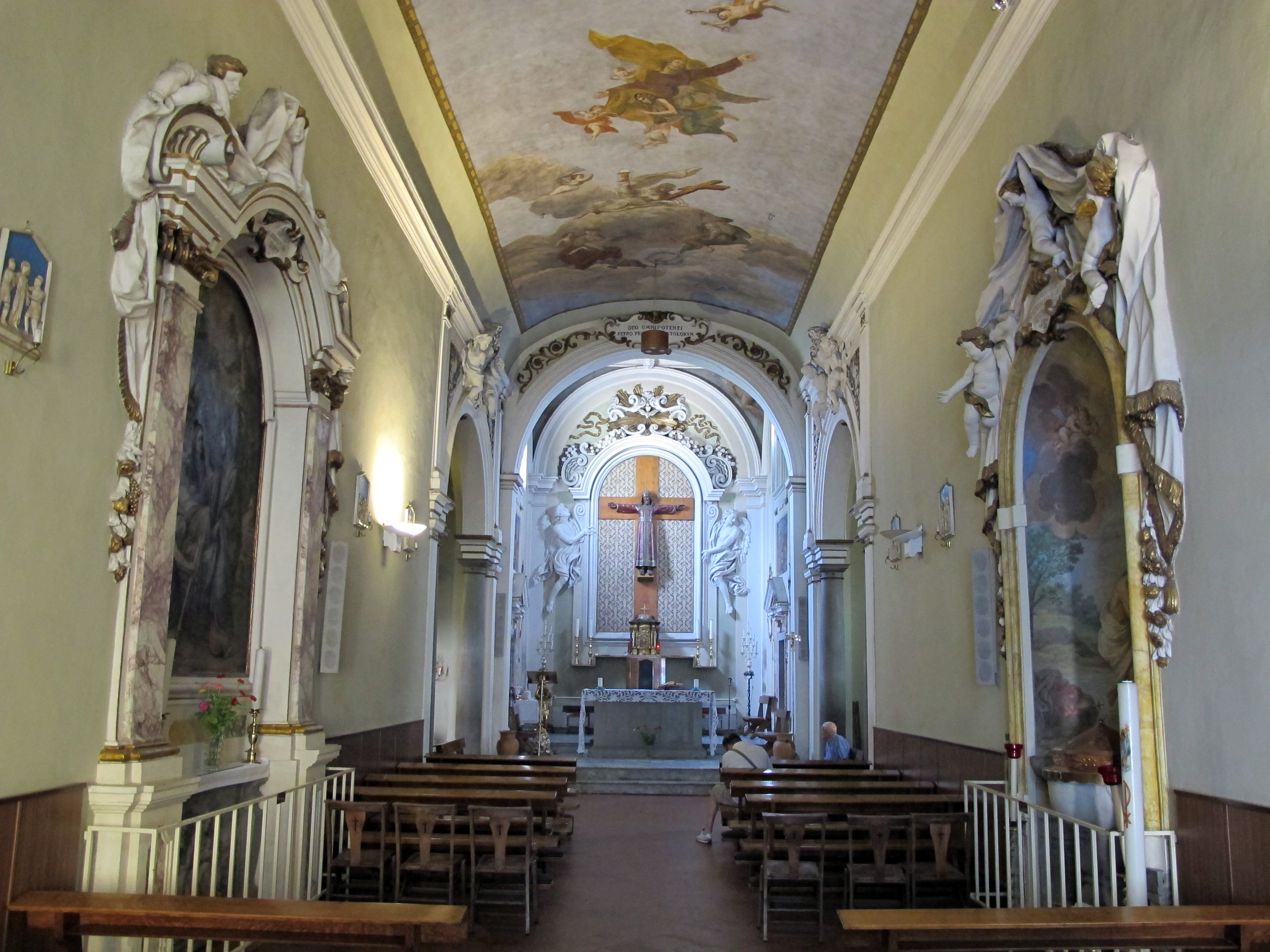
Interior

San Pietro a Varlungo (Italian: Chiesa di San Pietro a Varlungo) is Roman Catholic church located on via di Varlungo in Florence, Italy. It was located outside of the former late-medieval walls of Florence.

== History ==
A church at the site has a long history, and tradition holds that Charlemagne stayed at this site. Documents from the beginning of the 12th-century document the church. The early patronage of the structure was by the Bonciani family, but in the 17th century it underwent reconstruction. In the 19th century, the belltower was erected and the facade portico was eliminated.

During the Second World War, the parish arranged sanctuary to persecuted Jews from Florence. The parish leaders, Leto Casini and Giovanni Simioni are recognized as meriting the honorific title of Righteous Among the Nations by Yad Vashem.

== Interior ==
The narrow interior nave contains notable works of art dating to the 17th century refurbishment, including a fresco (1699) by Alessandro Gherardini; a Glory of St Jospth and a Baptism of Christ by Onorio Marinari; and a barrel-vaulted ceiling fresco depicts St Peter in Glory with Faith, Hope, and Charity by Baldassarre Franceschini called il Volterrano. The ciborium, made of pietra serena, was sculpted in the 15th century.

In the transept is housed a 13th-century tempera on wood painting depicting the Madonna and Child by the artist called the Master of Varlungo, a putative pupil of Cimabue. The adjacent oratory has a venerated wooden crucifix and in the canonry there is a tabernacle by Guarlone. On the street is a tabernacle from the school of Ghirlandaio depicting the Virgin and St John the Evangelist.

== Notes and Bibliography ==
- Francesco Lumachi Firenze - Nuova guida illustrata storica-artistica-aneddotica della città e dintorni, Firenze, Società Editrice Fiorentina, 1929
- Entry in "Luoghi della Fede", Regione Toscana.
