= Battle of Marciano =

1554 battle in the Italian Wars

Battle of Marciano or Battle of Scannagallo
- Part of the Italian War of 1551
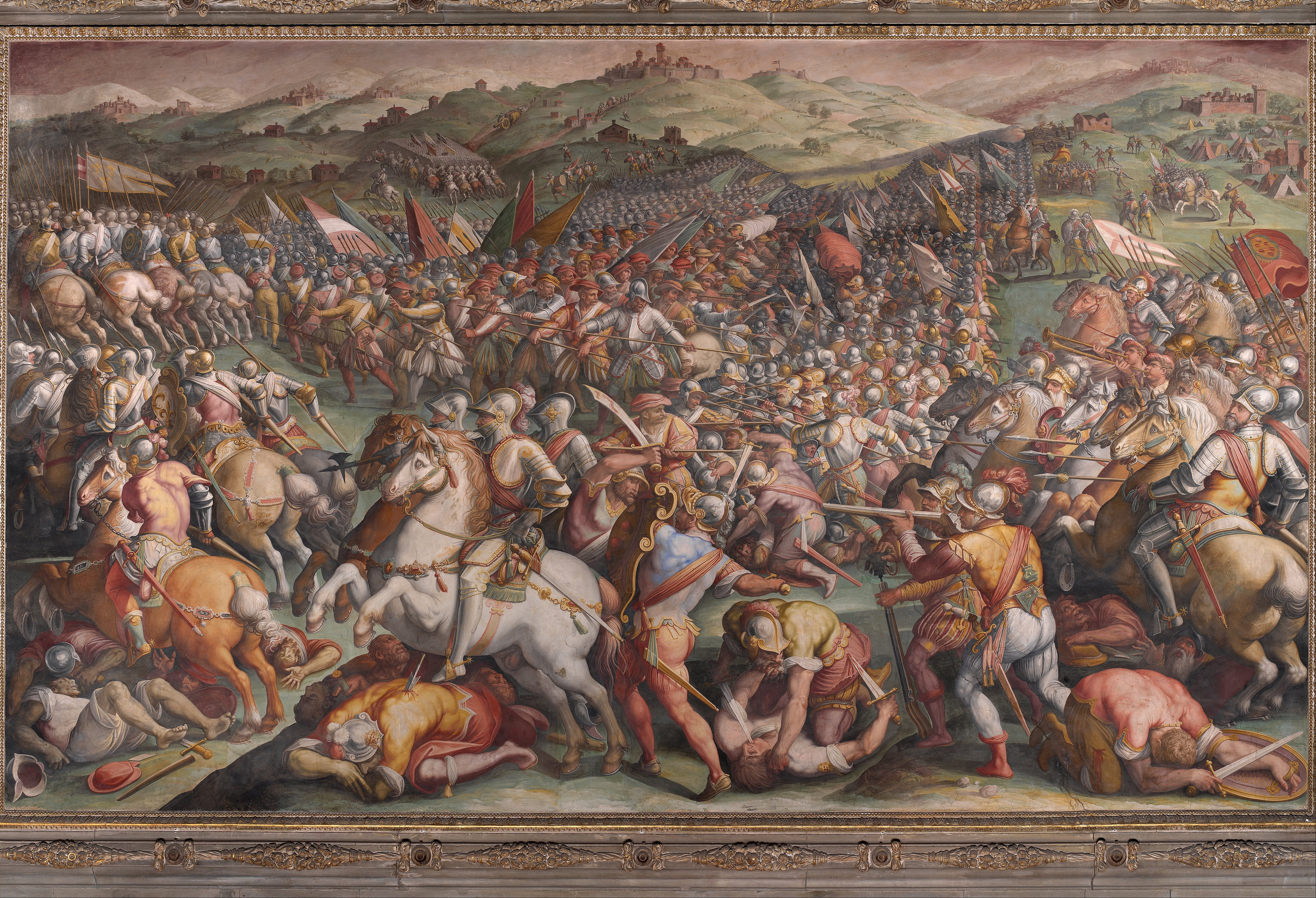
- The Battle of Scannagallo by Giorgio Vasari, in the Palazzo Vecchio of Florence.
Date	August 2, 1554
Location	Marciano della Chiana, Italy
Result	Florentine-Imperial victory

Belligerents
Duchy of Florence; Holy Roman Empire; Spain	Republic of Siena; France

Commanders and leaders
(Holy Roman Empire) (Spain) Gian Giacomo Medici	France Piero Strozzi

Strength
~17,000 infantry ~1,500 cavalry	~14,000 infantry ~1,000 cavalry 5 guns

Casualties and losses
~200 killed	~4,000 killed ~4,000 captured

The Battle of Marciano (also known as the Battle of Scannagallo) occurred in the countryside of Marciano della Chiana, near Arezzo, Tuscany, on August 2, 1554, during the Italian War of 1551. The battle pitted an army of the Duchy of Florence and the Empire of Charles V, commanded by Gian Giacomo Medici, and an army of the Republic of Siena and France, led by Piero Strozzi. The Imperial-Florentine army inflicted a crushing victory, marking the defeat of the Republic of Siena and leading to its absorption into the Duchy of Florence.

== Prelude ==
In 1554, Cosimo I de' Medici, with the support of King of Spain and Holy Roman Emperor Charles V, launched a grand campaign to conquer Florence's last remaining rival in Tuscany, the Republic of Siena. His army was under the command of Imperial condottiero Gian Giacomo Medici, Marquis of Marignano, best known as "Medeghino" ("Small Medici"). The Florentine-Imperial troops were divided into three corps: Federico Barbolani di Montauto, with 800 men, landed in southern Tuscany to conquer the area of Grosseto; Rodolfo Baglioni, with 3,000 men, invaded the Val di Chiana to conquer Chiusi, Pienza, and Montalcino; and the main corps under Medeghino himself, consisting of 4,500 infantry, 20 cannons, and 1,200 sappers, was deployed at Poggibonsi for the main attack against Siena.

The Sienese entrusted the defence to condottiero Piero Strozzi, a fierce rival of the Medici family and a general in French service. French troops, as well as some Florentine exiled by the Medici, took part in the war under the Sienese aegis. In response, the Florentine troops approached Siena on the night of January 26, 1554. After an initial failed assault, the Marquis of Marignano laid siege to the city, although his men were not numerous enough to totally cut it off from the countryside. Both Baglioni and Montauto failed to capture Pienza and Grosseto. French ships harassed the Florentine resupply lines at Piombino. In response, Cosimo replied by hiring Ascanio della Corgna with 6,000 infantry and 300 cavalry, and waiting for further Imperial reinforcements. Baglioni was killed and Corgna captured in a heavy setback in Chiusi in March, but Marignano maintained the siege.

On June 11, Strozzi attempted a sally to relieve the pressure on Siena, leaving some French units in the city. He moved towards Pontedera, forcing Medeghino to raise the siege to follow him. This did not prevent Strozzi from joining with a French contingent with 3,500 infantry, 700 horse, and 4 cannons in the territory of Lucca. On June 21, Strozzi conquered Montecatini, but did not feel confident enough to join in a pitched battle against Medeghino, waiting instead for further French reinforcements which were to arrive at Viareggio. He had, in total, 9,500 infantry and perhaps 1,200 cavalry, while Medici had 2,000 Spanish, 3,000 German, and 6,000 Italian infantry, as well as 600 cavalry, not to mention further troops from Spain and Corsica which had recently landed at Bocca d'Arno. His brother, Leone Strozzi, had been killed by an arquebus ball in the course of the struggle for Grosseto.

Strozzi therefore marched back to Siena, where the supply situation had become desperate. In July, he failed to capture Piombino, in southern Tuscany, the only port from which the French supplies could reach Siena. On July 17, conscious that only a victory in a pitched battle could save the city, he tried a third sally in the Val di Chiana, in the direction of Arezzo, leaving 1,000 infantry and 200 cavalry as a garrison under Blaise de Montluc. His field army included 14,000 infantry, about 1,000 cavalry, and five guns. His force easily overwhelmed the small Florentine garrisons on his way, although the attempt, on July 20, to conquer Arezzo failed. He managed to capture Lucignano, Marciano della Chiana, Foiano, and other centres in the following days. After some days of inactivity, Medeghino raised the siege of Siena and moved to meet Strozzi.

== Previous movements ==
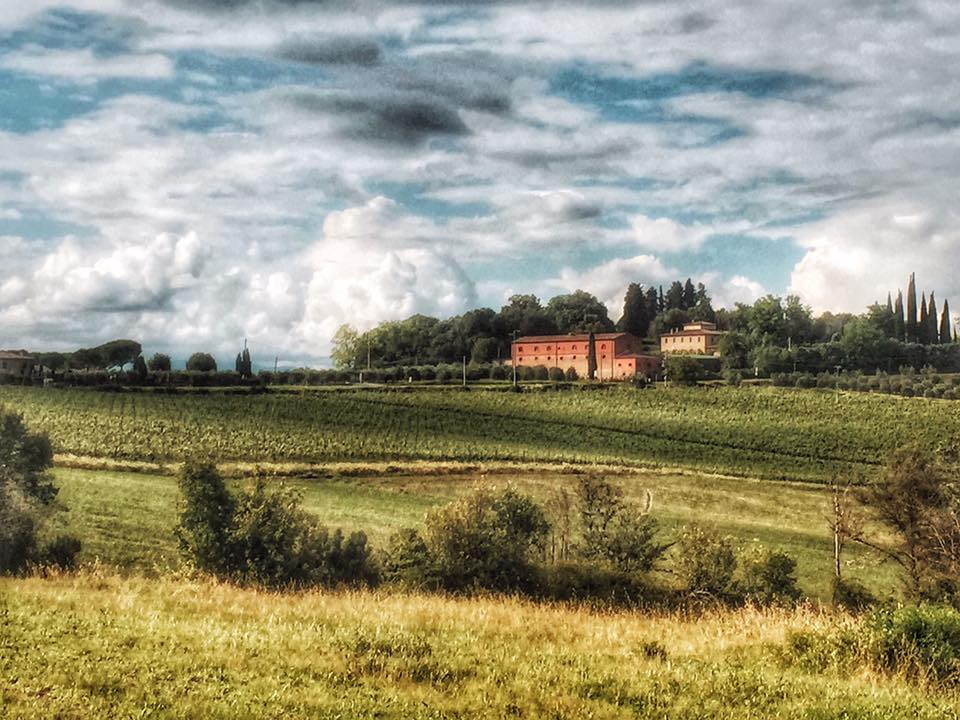
View of the Scannagallo battlefield from Santa Luce hill to Poggio delle Donne, after the battle name Santa Vittoria (the holy victory). The battlefield is still probably as 500 years ago surrounded by fields, olive trees and vineyards and with a small river in the place of the old one.

The two armies camped at both sides of the dry riverbed Scannagallo, near the hills of Marciano. After judging his position unfavorable, and faced with increasing difficulties to supply his army, Strozzi decided to retreat to higher terrain towards Lucignano, performing a quick withdrawal on the night of August 1 with the hope of not letting Medeghino react in time. However, the move failed, as Medeghino discovered him and saw a chance to catch his enemy off guard. Medici immediately ordered his Spanish and Italian arquebusiers to attack Strozzi, while ordering his cavalry to prepare in Chiana for an immenent launch. With his rear guard peppered by the Imperial skirmishers, Strozzi realized his mistake and reversed his march, managing to drive them back and occupy the slight slope of a hill that descended towards the Scannagallo creek. The two armies formed on both sides of the Scannagallo.

== Order of battle ==
Strozzi placed 1,000 Franco-Sienese cavalry under Ludovico Pico della Mirandola on a right wing. At the center he arranged three squads of infantry, with the right squad being 3,000 German landsknechts under Georg Reckenrot, the center squad being 5,000 French and Grison pikemen under Marc-Antoine Viarron de Velleron and Raimond de Fourquevaux, and the left 4,000 Italian infantry under Paolo Orsini. He had no artillery available.

For his part, Medici placed his cavalry on a left wing under Sforza de Santa Fiora and Marcantonio Colonna. He arranged his infantry in four squads and a shorter and more dense line, with the 2,000 men of the Tercio of Corsica under Lorenzo Juárez de Figueroa in the left squad, 2,000 of the Tercios of Naples and Sicily under Francisco de Haro at the left-center squad, 4,000 German landsknechts under Nicolò Madruzzo at the right-center, and 5,000 Spanish and Tuscan soldiers under Giuseppe Cantelmo and Juan Manrique de Lara at the right. His artillery was placed on higher terrain behind them, and a reserve included a company of arquebusiers from Spain and Naples under Camillo Colonna, both on foot and on horse.

== Battle ==
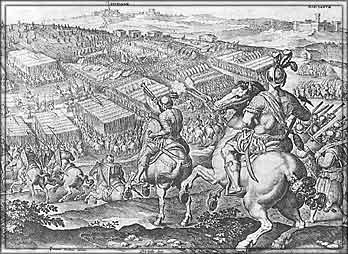
The Battle of Marciano in an early print.

The battle began with the attack of the Medeghino's cavalry wing, whose impetus easily routed its French-Sienese counterpart, which fled towards Foiano. It would be later rumored that Medici had bribed one of the French ensigns into fleeing the battle, paying him with twelve tin flasks filled with golden coins.

To counter this first setback, Strozzi decided to launch down from the hill with the German infantry in his center. A chaotic melee ensued, but soon the momentum of the attack began to wane under the fire of the Imperial artillery, which also disorganized the Swiss attempting to relieve the first line. Francisco de Haro directed a maneuver during the battle to extend the line and prevent Strozzi's longer line from enveloping them. When Medeghino ordered his center to press and advance, the German and Swiss began to panic and were forced to fall back.

The retreat of the Franco-Sienese cavalry finished the battle. Colonna and Santa Fiora, who had pursued for a while the French-Sienese cavalry, returned and performed a pincer movement on the Germans fighting across the Scannagallo, attacking them from behind. Strozzi's army collapsed, with only his French infantry on the right wing, surrounded on every side, maintaining its battle order and defending desperately until the end. Strozzi himself was wounded three times and was carried away by his guards. His lieutenant Clemente della Cervara was then wounded himself and died shortly after the battle.

The battle lasted for only two hours, from 11 a.m to 1 p.m. The Franco-Sienese army suffered 4,000 dead and 4,000 wounded or prisoners, while the Florentine-Imperial army only suffered around 400 dead. 103 green standards sent by Henry II were captured. Strozzi managed to escape and take refuge in Lucignano. Fourquevaux was also captured and was mistakenly believed dead in France, due to which his wife reportedly died of grief.

== Aftermath ==
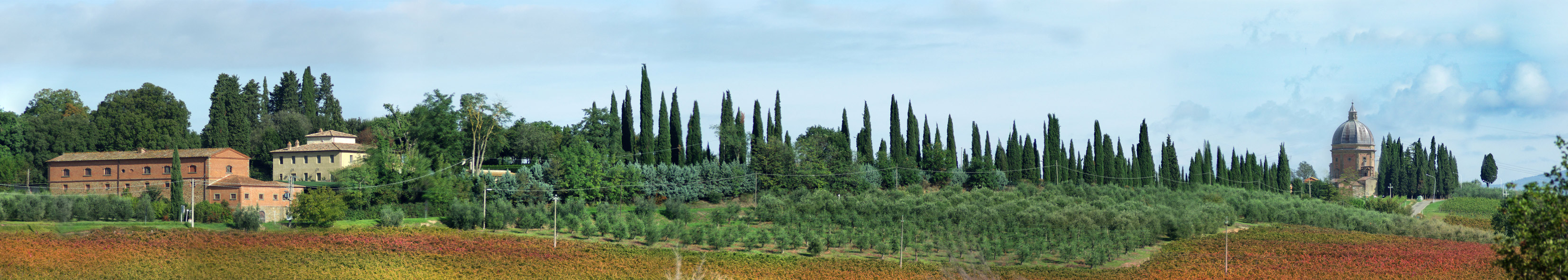
Santo Stefano alla Vittoria temple by Giorgio Vasari, built to celebrate the battle.

The battle was received with great joy in Florence. From the windows of the Palazzo Vecchio, Duke Cosimo ordered to throw coins to the crowd and proclaimed three days of celebrations, accompanied by the ringing of bells and waving of conquered flags. People sung palle, palle, duca, duca / Piero Strozzi in una buca ("bullets, bullets, the duke, the duke / Piero Strozzi in a hole"). A stage was erected in the square, in which many prisoners captured in the battle were beheaded.

Il Medeghino easily subdued the neighbouring castles in the days following the battle, and was subsequently able to lay a tighter siege to Siena. Cruel measures were adopted to prevent the peasants taking supplies into the city. In March 1555 he destroyed a corps of 1,300 mercenaries trying to escape to collect food. Unable to receive substantial supplies and reinforcements from the French, the city surrendered on April 17, 1555 while the remaining Sienese forces withdrew to Montalcino.

The Republic of Siena finally disappeared in 1559 and was thenceforth incorporated into the Duchy of Florence. The Duke ordered that a large fortress be constructed as a precaution against the risk of further rebellion by the Sienese, and this has presided over the city, from its north (Florentine) side, since its completion in 1563.
