= Temple of Santo Stefano della Vittoria =

Church in Pozzo della Chiana, Italy

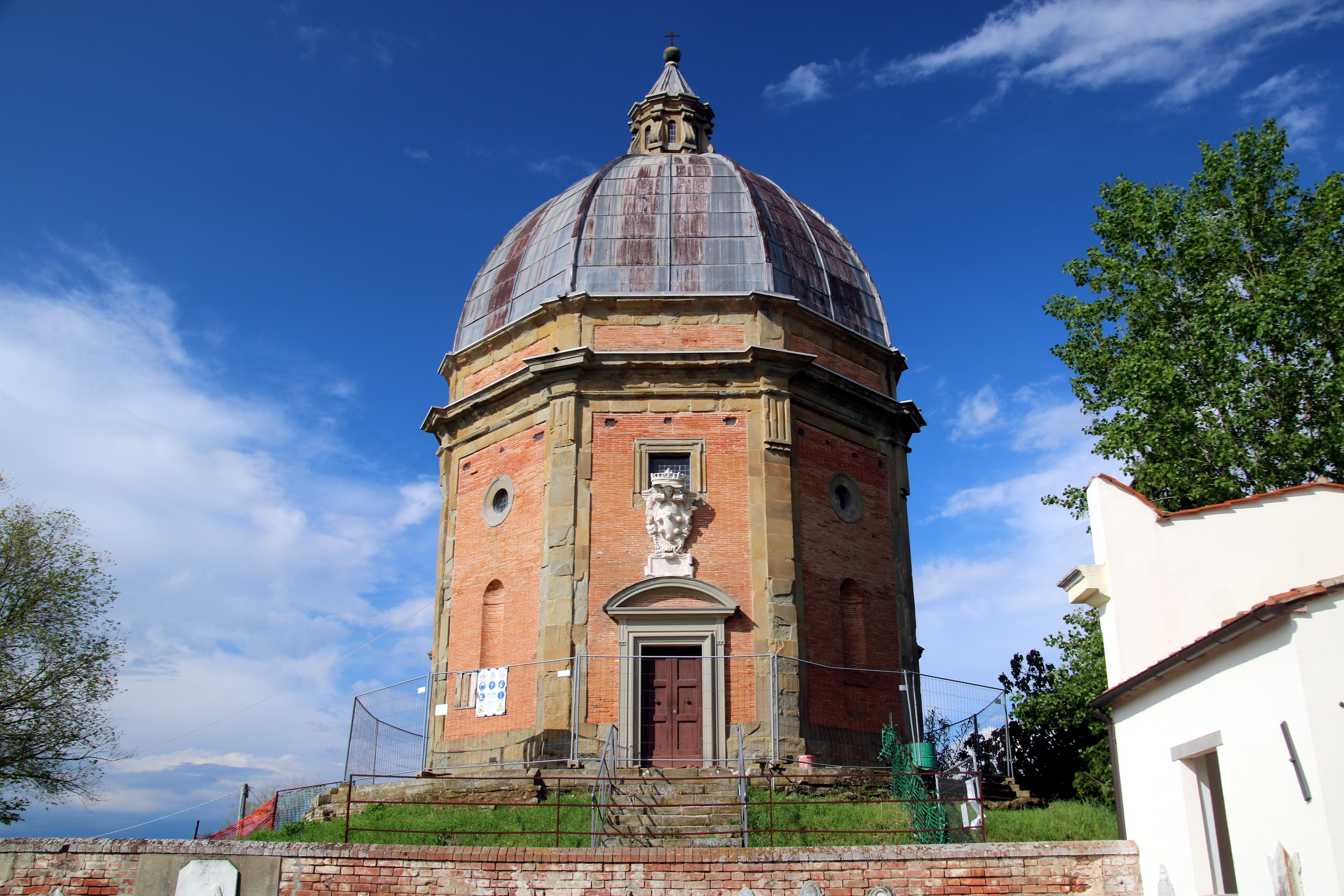
Tempio of San Stefano della Vittoria

The Temple of Santo Stefano della Vittoria (in Italian, Tempio di Santo Stefano della Vittoria) is a small chapel-church located in Pozzo della Chiana, a small hamlet near Foiano della Chiana in the province of Arezzo. The octagonal domed structure looms over the plain of Scannagallo, and was commissioned by Cosimo I de' Medici to commemorate his victory in 1554 over the forces of Siena.

== The temple ==
The temple was commissioned by Grand Duke Cosimo I de' Medici just above the plain of Scannagallo, where in 1554 the troops of the Imperial Coalition (both Florentine and Spanish manned or funded troops) decisively defeated the French-Senese troops in the Battle of Scannagallo, finalizing the conflicts between Florence and Siena. This outcome led to the surrender and cession of besieged Siena to Florence, and leading to its induction into the Grand-Duchy of Tuscany. The temple is dedicated to Saint Stephen of Hungary, whose patron day falls on the day of the battle. The small centralized plan recalls other votive churches, such as Santa Maria della Peste and the Tempietto by Bramante at San Pietro in Montorio. The structure resembles a domed tower, augmenting its visibility, and recalls the high dome of the Cathedral of Florence and the Cappella dei Principi.

The construction of the temple is traditionally attributed to the Italian architect and sculptor Bartolommeo Ammannati, but has recently been linked to the professional collaboration between two Italian artists, Ammannati himself and Giorgio Vasari. It was built in 1569-1570 as an octagon with a typically Florentine apse, and it also includes a series of ancient ornaments. The use of Doric order is in line with the latest European art style of Mannerism. It also articulates the exterior columns of the temple. The walls are made of brick and exterior columns in a pietra serena.

The pediment of the front facade contains the House of Medici coat of arms, and it also contains the Latin script of the new family title. Inside the temple, above the door, you can see the Gianfigliazzi family coat of arms. On the walls, there are two Latin epigraphs dedicated to the institution Ordine dei Cavalieri di Santo Stefano, founded in Pisa in 1561 by the Duke (already Grand Master), with the purpose of protecting the Tyrrhenian Sea from Barbary pirates, to whom the temple was previously donated. The order of Santo Stefano was also named after the date of this victory.

The church is now property of the commune. It received damage from a lightning strike in 1972, and was closed for many years. Plans to reopen the church were underway by 2020.
