= Master of Varlungo =

Italian painter

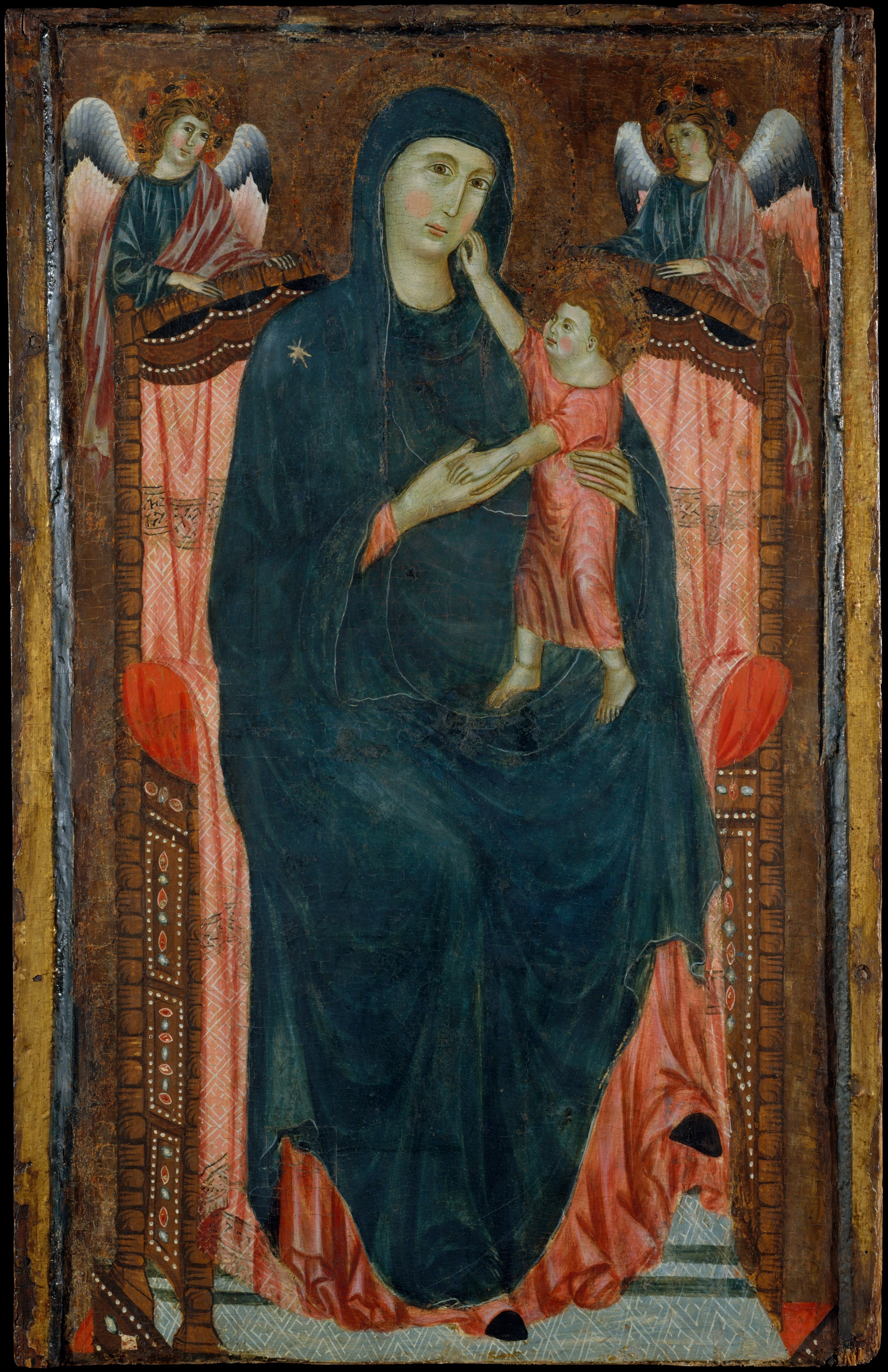
Madonna and Child Enthroned with Angels at Metropolitan Museum of Art, New York City.

The Master of Varlungo was an Italian painter active in a Gothic style around Florence between 1285 and 1310.

No documentation exists about the painter; his name is attached to pictures dating from the last two decades of the thirteenth century. His central work is a fragmentary Madonna and Child still located in the church of San Pietro a Varlungo, Florence. On a stylistic basis, he was assigned by Roberto Longhi in 1948 as a principal pupil of Cimabue, and as influenced by Giotto. A panel at the Metropolitan Museum of Art in New York, depicting a Madonna and Child Enthroned with Angels has been attributed to this painter.
