= Santuario della Madonna della Querce, Lucignano =

Church in Lucignano, Italy

Coordinates: 43.2789°N 11.7390°E

The Sanctuary of the Madonna of the Oak or Santuario della Madonna della Querce is a Renaissance-style, Roman Catholic church located about a kilometer from the center of the town of Lucignano, in the region of Tuscany, Italy. The church is in the Roman Catholic Diocese of Arezzo-Cortona-Sansepolcro.

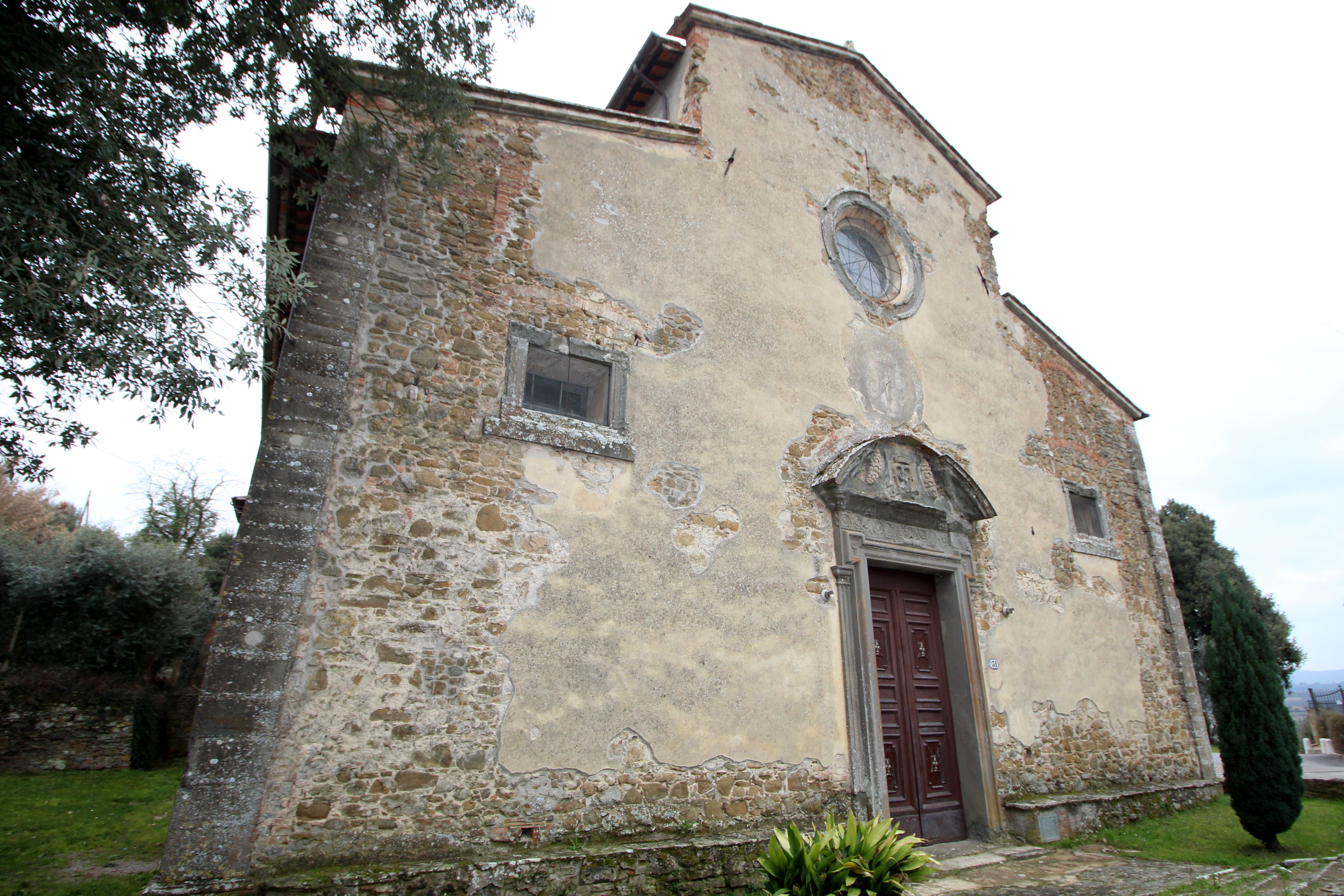
Exterior of the Sanctuary of the Madonna of the Oak

== History ==
The 16th-century church at the site of a large oak tree upon which an image of the Madonna had been painted. A tabernacle had been erected at the site in 1417. A spring was discovered during construction, leading to its attribution as a miracle. The depiction of the Madonna and child, a Maesta (1417) is attributed to Feliciano Batone, and is now encased in a baroque frame.

The design is attributed to Giorgio Vasari, and the church was erected in 1564. Circa 1585, the church was conceded by pope Gregory XIII to the Servite Order. The servites officiated the church until 1783.

Like the Santissima Annunziata, Florence, the church has a central nave and two aisles. The stucco sculpture work was completed by Ippolito Bracci, who also completed the central portal (1551). The church was consecrated in 1617. In 1697, Pope Innocent XI gave the church, designating the church as the Sanctuary of the Virgine Addolorata of Tuscany.

Among the altarpieces is a Saints Benedict, Apollonia, and Catherine of Siena (1625) by Matteo Rosselli.
