= Mario Reali =

Italian poet and writer (1939–2017)

Mario Lucrezio Reali (9 October 1939 – 7 December 2017) was an Italian poet and writer and a prominent expert in natural gas and oil. He received the highest Russian decoration of the energy industry: "Meritorious Worker of Gas Industry of Russian Federation", in 1999 and in 2005 from Gazprom.

Reali died on 7 December 2017, at the age of 77.

== Career ==
Reali graduated in chemistry at Moscow State University and at Università di Bologna. He spent many years in the Soviet Union as a leading officer for Italian chemical groups Montedison (1967–1981) and Eni (1981–1991). In 1991–1993 Reali was head of the Italo-Russian Chamber of Commerce; subsequently, he returned to ENI as consultant for the CIS area. In this position, Reali managed the construction of the Blue Stream pipeline of which he was one of the creators.

Reali has been one of the key participants in the deal regarding energy supplies from Russia to Italy; he took part in the construction of the Russian pipelines towards Europe, in particular the Urengoy–Pomary–Uzhhorod pipeline. He began cooperating with Kazakhstan in developing the Karachaganak and Kashagan oil and gas fields.

== Poetry ==
He published three poem collections with Sandro Teti Editore: "Tramonto in Europa", (Sunset in Europe, 2006), winning the Santa Marinella award: "L'anima corrotta"(The Corrupted Soul, 2007), which obtained the 2008 international Agape prize for Poetry, and "L'uomo a quanti" (The Quantum Man, 2008), presented at the Turin International Book Fair. In 2011 Reali published in the United States "A Tired Angel. Selected Poems", edited by Paolo Lagazzi and Irene Marchegiani, with Gradiva Publications.

=== Critical response ===
Paolo Lagazzi, literary critic, wrote about Reali's sense of modern life, calling it "the whipping up tsunami of chaos". About L'anima corrotta, Lagazzi wrote: "The voice of the poet points to the corruption of the soul as origin, before the modernity sin, but he reminds us that the amazement and the beauty will be able to opposite to it until the extreme". Introducing L'uomo a quanti, Lagazzi observed "an energy that can overthrow the common categories of thought". The poet and literary critic Giancarlo Baroni identified the theme of the book with "moving forward the horizon, taking it as a movable frontier, not a barrier; the needs – that cannot be renounced – to look elsewhere, to avert being enmeshed and caged, limited and compressed; the need to avert surrender".

When A Tired Angel was published in 2011, Lagazzi presented the book saying that "Mario Lucrezio Reali [...] with his harsh and energetic wisdom has soon become one of the most gifted among the new Italian poets [...] few contemporary authors know how to exploit so radically the ambiguity of language in order to dig into the old history of Western civilization".

== Press review ==
- Carlo Boffitto, L'atteggiamento delle imprese italiane in Russia (The Behavior of Italian enterprises in Russia), Istituto Nazionale per il Commercio Estero (Italian Institute for Foreign Trade, ICE), January 2001, page 12
- "Specchio", weekly magazine of the newspaper "La Stampa", 12 October 2005
- Bookshop Mondadori Venezia, presentation of Tramonto in Europa, 14 aprile 2007
- La via del gas (The Way of Gas), journalistic enquiry of the program "Report", Rai3, aired on 27 May 2007
- "Il Giornale", newspaper, 21 November 2006
- "Le Voci della Luna, Rivista Culturale" (The Voice of the Moon, Cultural Magazine), n.38, July 2007
- "Zapping", Rai Radio 1, poems aired on 2-11-18–26 March 2009
- "Poesia", Mensile Internazionale di Cultura Poetica (Poetry, Monthly Magazine of Poetic Culture), n.242, October 2009
