= Santa Maria della Peste, Viterbo =

Church building in Lazio, Italy

Santa Maria della Peste is a small, Renaissance-style, octagonal temple-chapel (tempietto) located on Piazza del Caduti in Viterbo, region of Lazio, Italy. It has now been converted into a chapel dedicated to those fallen (caduti) in the wars of the 20th century. Across the piazza and Via Filippo Ascenzi is the church of San Giovanni Battista degli Almadiani.

== History and description ==
The tempietto was built at the beginning of the 16th century to give thanks to the Virgin Mary for the ending of the epidemic of 1493–1494. The scourges for that year seem to consist of both syphilis and the bubonic plague. Epidemics recurrently affected towns in Europe over the centuries, with plague affecting Viterbo in 1363, 1374, 1400, 1463, 1476, 1522, 1566, and 1657. The architect is unknown, but the octagonal layout with a small domed roof recalls another contemporary Renaissance tempietto by Bramante at San Pietro in Montorio in Rome. In the last century, the chapel has been rededicated to those who died in wars.

== Notes ==
42.41897°N 12.10432°E
