= Bocca d'Arno =

Coordinates: 43°40′48″N 10°16′43″E

Bocca d'Arno (lit. 'mouth of the Arno'; also spelled as one word: Boccadarno) is the traditional denomination of the late course of the Arno river, in Tuscany, central Italy. It is located near Marina di Pisa.
