= Lucignano =

- Comune
- Comune di Lucignano
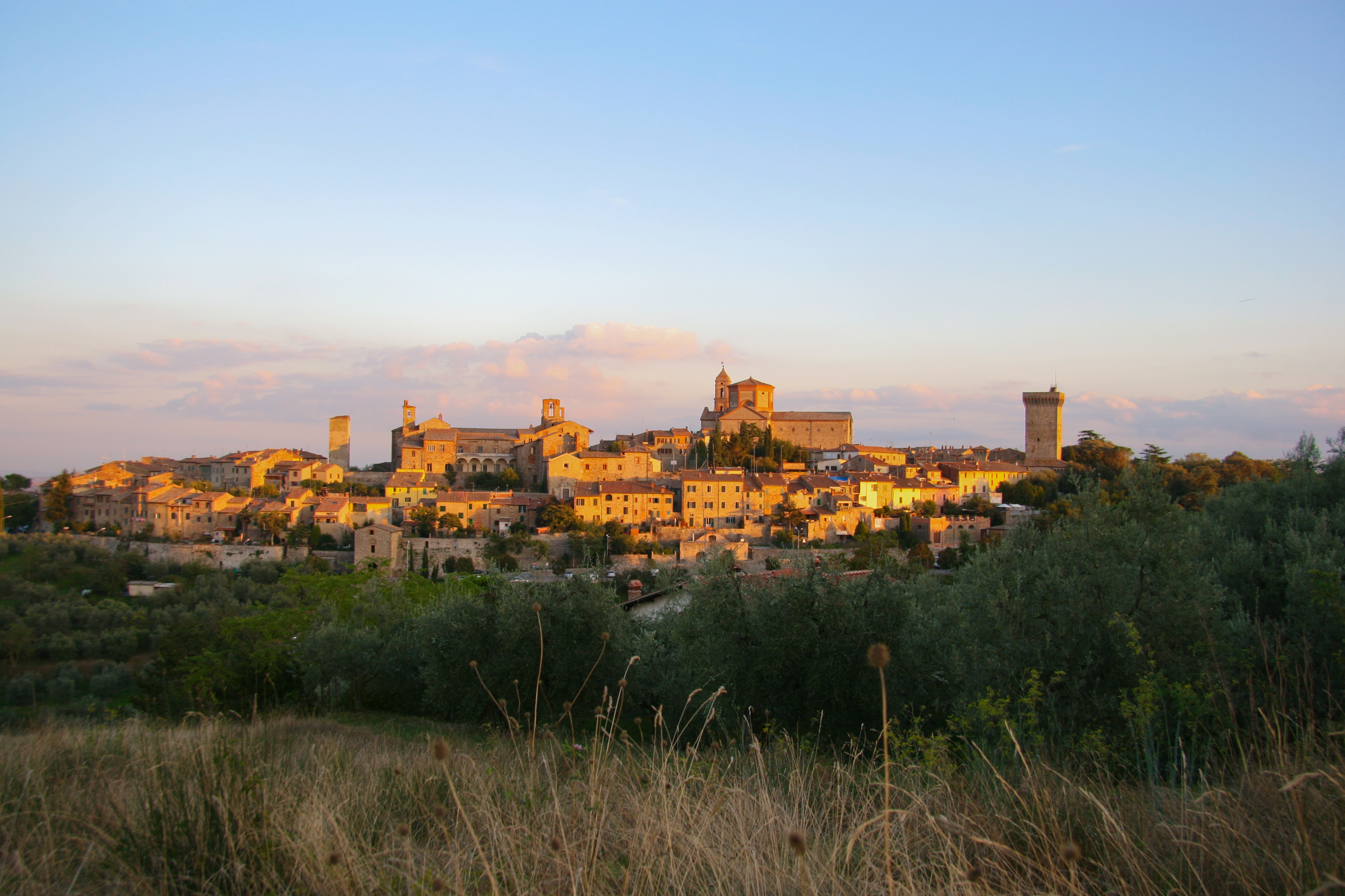
- Lucignano from the castle

- Location within Italy Location within Tuscany
- Coordinates: 43°16′N 11°45′E
- Country: Italy
- Region: Tuscany
- Province: Arezzo (AR)

Area
  - Total: 44.9 km^{2} (17.3 sq mi)
- Elevation: 400 m (1,300 ft)

Population (30 September 2017)
  - Total: 3,546
  - Density: 79.0/km^{2} (205/sq mi)
- Demonym: Lucignanesi
- Time zone: UTC+1 (CET)
  - Summer (DST): UTC+2 (CEST)
- Postal code: 52046
- Dialing code: 0575
- Website: Official website

Lucignano is a comune (municipality) in the Province of Arezzo in the Italian region Tuscany, located about 70 kilometres (43 mi) southeast of Florence and about 25 kilometres (16 mi) southwest of Arezzo.

Lucignano borders the following municipalities: Foiano della Chiana, Marciano della Chiana, Monte San Savino, Rapolano Terme, and Sinalunga. It is one of I Borghi più belli d'Italia ("The most beautiful villages of Italy").

== History ==
The name Lucignano probably derives from the Roman family of the consul Licinio. Known as the "pearl of Valdichiana", Lucignano is a remarkably conserved medieval walled hill-top village (400 meters above sea level), elliptical in shape. Its altitude and strategic position on the road between Siena and Arezzo meant that between 1200 and 1500 it was continually the subject of battles between these cities, involving also Florence and Perugia. Its walls, with three gates, were constructed by the Sienese in 1371. Once the town came under the rule of Florence, construction began of the fortress, attributed to Bernardo Puccini.

== Main sights ==
Sights include:

- Sanctuary of the Madonna della Querce (attributed to Giorgio Vasari), c. 1568
- Convent of the Cappuccini (c. 1580)
- Church of the Misericordia (1582)
- Collegiata di San Michele Arcangelo (1594)
- Church of San Francesco
- Church of San Biagio
- Church of Santissima Annunziata

Of note is the elaborate reliquary made for the church of San Francesco, which is now in the Museo Civico, on the ground floor of the 13th Century town hall (Italian: Palazzo Pretorio). Called the L’albero della vita (The Tree of Life; The Golden Tree or The Tree of Lucignano) the central stem is supported on a Gothic reliquary, from which spread out twelve branches, surmounted by a Crucifix and a pelican. On the branches there are sprigs of coral, representing the blood of Christ. The tree is gilded and bejeweled and is signed by two jewellers, Ugolino di Vieri in 1350 and Gabriello D'Antonio in 1471. Also in the museum are works by Luca Signorelli, the Sienese School, and a Crucifixion from Umbria.

== Cinema ==
The 2010 film Certified Copy directed by Abbas Kiarostami was set and filmed in Lucignano.

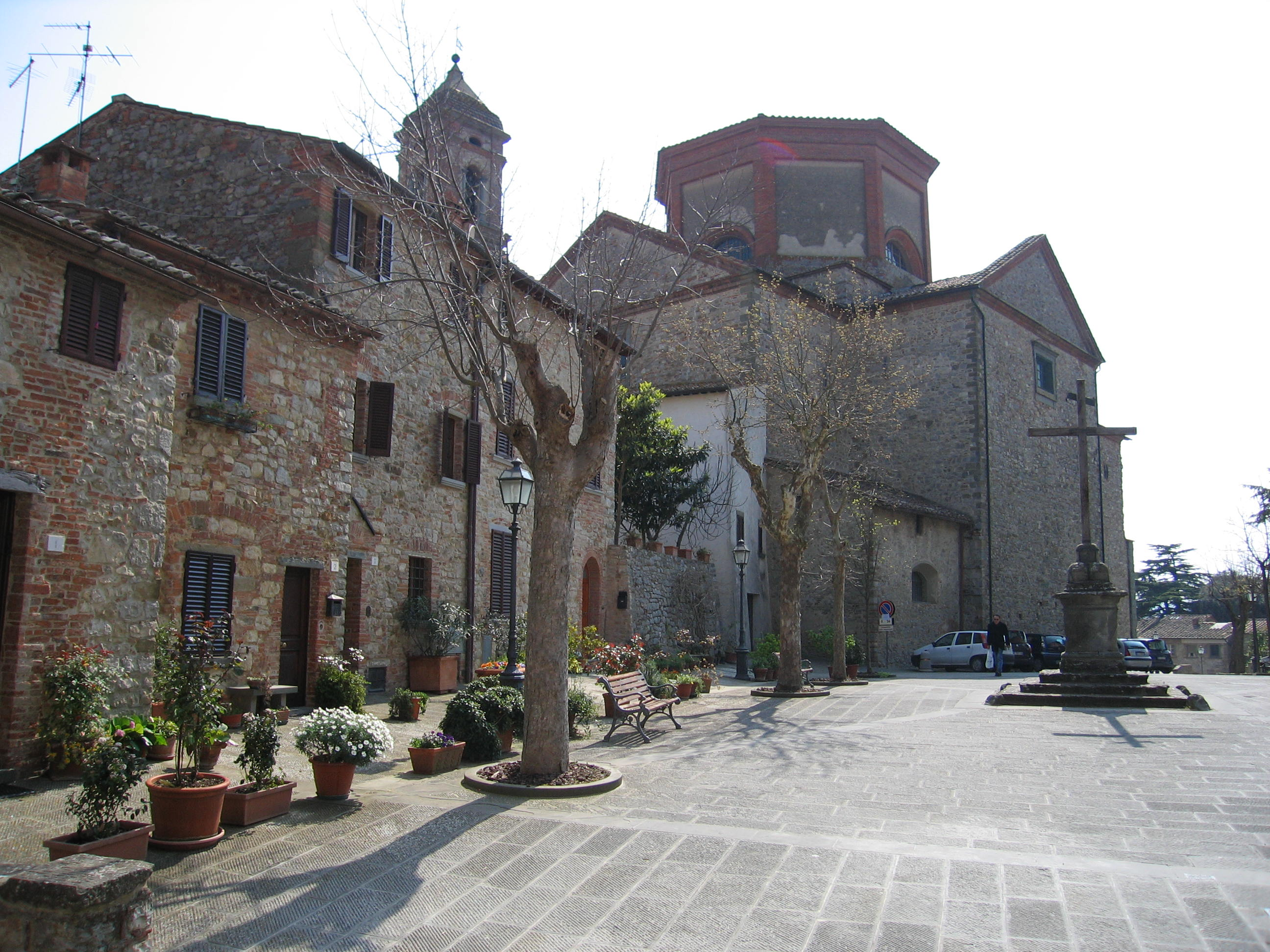
Piazza S. Francesco with the church of S. Francesco in the background.
