= Foiano della Chiana =

- Comune
- Comune di Foiano della Chiana
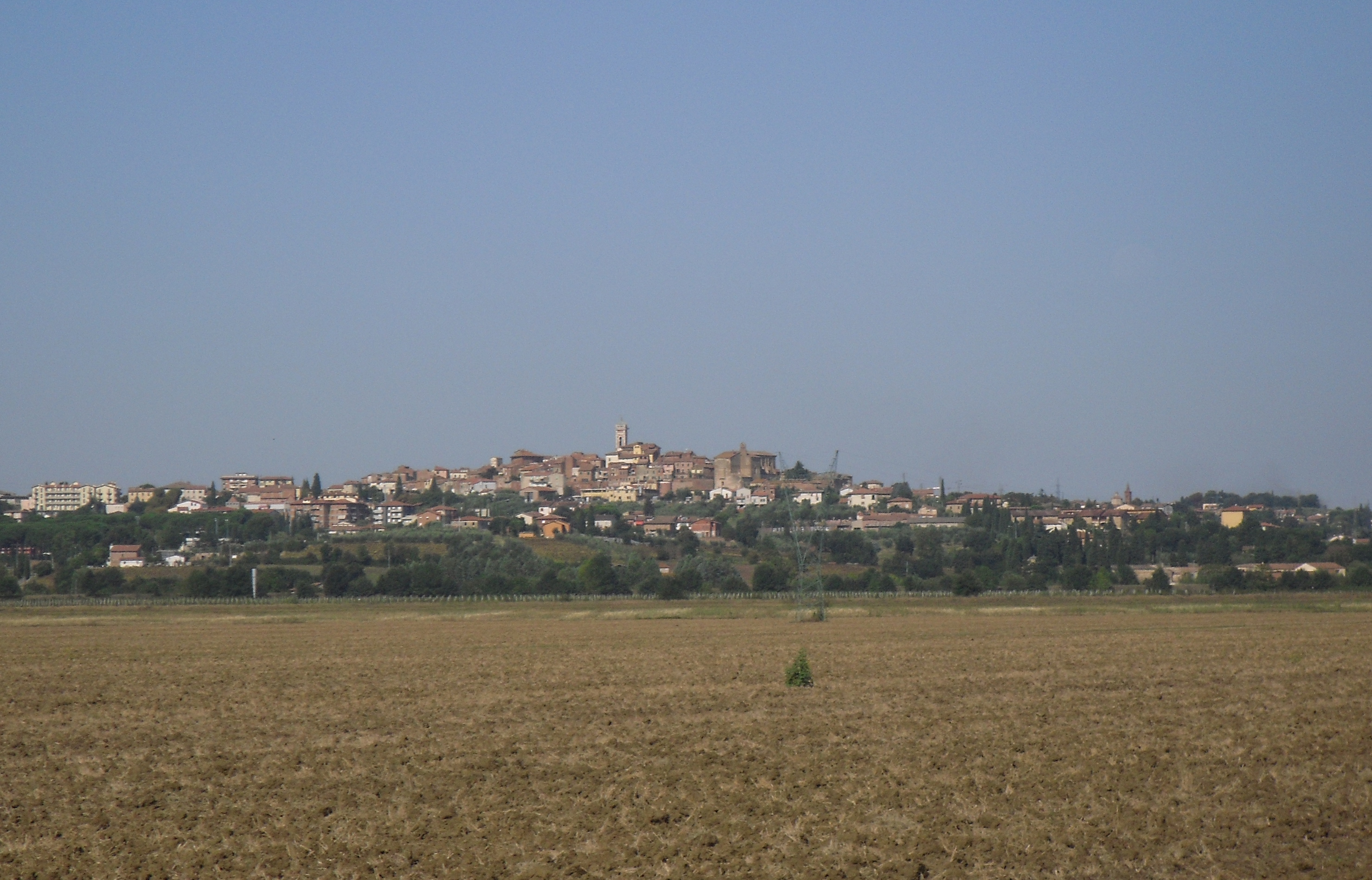
- View of Foiano della Chiana

- Coat of arms

- Location within Italy Location within Tuscany
- Coordinates: 43°15′N 11°49′E
- Country: Italy
- Region: Tuscany
- Province: Arezzo (AR)
- Frazioni: Case Nuove, La Pace, Ponte al Ramo, Pozzo della Chiana, Renzino, Santa Luce

Government
  - Mayor: Jacopo Franci

Area
  - Total: 40.77 km^{2} (15.74 sq mi)
- Elevation: 318 m (1,043 ft)

Population (31 August 2017)
  - Total: 9,471
  - Density: 232.3/km^{2} (601.7/sq mi)
- Demonym: Foianesi
- Time zone: UTC+1 (CET)
  - Summer (DST): UTC+2 (CEST)
- Postal code: 52045
- Dialing code: 0575
- Patron saint: St. Martin
- Saint day: 11 November
- Website: Official website

Foiano della Chiana is a small agricultural town in eastern Tuscany, in the province of Arezzo, between the cities of Sinalunga and Cortona. It is well known for its annual carnival.

== History ==
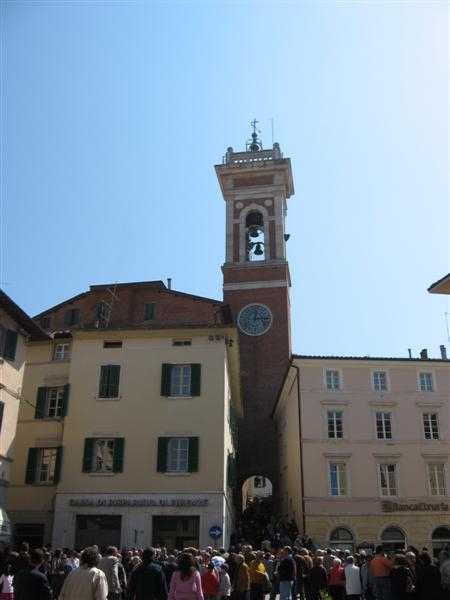
Foiano della Chiana

Foiano's name, according to a legend, derives from the god Janus who, when he went up the Tiber River and settled in the shadow of a hill, called it Flos Janus. Also, a parchment dating back to 842 CE was found in which Lothar I mentions the Roman Campus Fugianus.

In 1383, control of Foiano passed from Arezzo to Florence and the inhabitants built fortified walls around the town. In 1387 the city became a free commune and the first communal statute was drafted. After the siege of the Aragonese, Foiano fell back into Florentine control and the new "heart shaped" town walls were built in 1480.

Foiano was the best defense point in the Valdichiana because it used to be surrounded on three sides by marshland. In order to access the town, the inhabitants and visitors would have to arrive by boat where it was marshy, otherwise by land into the town. The marshland existed where the Chiana river now flows. The Castle of Foiano was built on the southern side of the city and changed hands many times according to who ruled the land. Leonardo da Vinci arrived in Foiano in 1502 and began to draw up plans for the draining of the Valdichiana and also the famous map of Valdichiana. In 1525, Foiano was the first commune to give up its marshlands to the Medici for draining. It took three centuries to drain the Val di Chiana, continuing during the Lorena rule. Only when, with the fall of Siena in 1554, all the territory passed under the dominion of the Medici, a coordinated and complete plan of reclamation could be prepared. Figures like Leonardo da Vinci, Antonio da Sangallo the Younger, Baldassarre Peruzzi and Vignola were involved in the work.

In 1789, Napoleon’s troops came through Tuscany, but the French Revolution had no influence on Foiano, which enjoyed their pre-existing protection under Florence. In 1862, Foiano took on the name Foiano della Chiana and it was one of the first municipalities to elect a town council by popular majority.

== Main sights ==
Inside the walled city, there are art and architectural works by Andrea della Robbia and other notable artists of the Renaissance.

Inside the church of San Michele Arcangelo, on the second south altar, a Madonna of the Rosary by Lorenzo Lippi and on the third north altar, and enameled terracotta of the Ascension by della Robbia and son Giovanni around 1495–1500.

The Corso Vittorio Emanuele leads to the Piazza della Collegiata where, inside the Collegiata itself, is the Madonna della Cintola done in 1502 by Andrea della Robbia, and Coronation of the Virgin by the Luca Signorelli school.

The church of Santa Maria della Fraternità houses four paintings by Giovanni Camillo Sagrestani and the statue of Madonna and Child by Andrea della Robbia (around 1460), based on a model by his uncle Luca.

Architectural works of Foiano include the 14th century Palazzo Pretorio along one side of Piazza Cavour, and the Palazzo delle Logge on the other, built between the 16th and 17th centuries. The Palazzo delle Logge was the residence of Ferdinando II de Medici and the Municipal Historic Archive and the Library are now housed inside, with some of the halls used for exhibitions. The Civic Tower has been recently restored, preserving its original proportions and façade. The Garibaldi Theatre which used to be called Monte Pio in 1570 and the Palazzo Neri-Serneri are also found within the old town. Also, the grain loggias bearing the Medici arms are a good example of Foiano’s long history. Close to the town is located the small octagonal temple of Santo Stefano della Vittoria, built by Giorgio Vasari for Duke Cosimo I and dedicated to Cosimo's victory in the battle of Scannagallo.

== Notable people ==
- Antonio Circignani (1560–1620) was an Italian painter of the late-Renaissance. His works include Trinity in Chiesa della Santissima Trinità, Foiano della Chiana
- Luigi Vannuccini (1828–1911), composer and singing teacher
- Mario Lucrezio Reali (born Foiano 1939) is an Italian poet and writer and a prominent expert in natural gas and oil.
- Alessandro Fei (born 1978) is an Italian men's volleyball player, a member of Italy men's national volleyball team. Lives in the town
- Luca Vanni (born 1985) is an Italian professional tennis player. He competes mainly on the ATP Challenger Tour and ITF Futures, both in singles and doubles. Lives in the town

== See also ==
- Carnival of Foiano della Chiana
