= Orazio Porta =

Italian painter

- Adoration of the Magi, oil on canvas, Sant'Agostino, Monte San Savino
- Born: c. 1540; Monte San Savino, Duchy of Florence
- Died: 1616; Monte San Savino, Grand Duchy of Tuscany
- Education: Giorgio Vasari
- Known for: Painting
- Movement: Renaissance; Mannerism

Orazio Porta (c. 1540–1616) was an Italian Mannerist painter and architect, primarily active in the Valdichiana.

== Biography ==
Orazio Porta was born in Monte San Savino, Arezzo, around 1540 into a family sufficiently wealthy to be inscribed in the catasto of the city. A pupil and assistant of Vasari, he worked extensively with his master on projects commissioned by the House of Medici. With Vasari, Porta decorated the panels on the ceiling of the Salone del Cinquecento and frescoed the vaults and walls of the courtyard of Palazzo Vecchio. In 1573, he moved to Rome, where he assisted Vasari for four months in the painting in the Sala Regia in the Apostolic Palace.

From 1573 onwards, Porta was primarily active in the Valdichiana, where he left numerous artistic works, including altars and canvases for the churches of Sant’Agostino and Sant’Antonio in his native Monte San Savino. He painted frescoes for the Certosa di Pontignano near Siena and for the left nave the Sanctuary of Santa Maria delle Vertighe, near Monte San Savino.

Orazio seems to have continued to collaborate with Vasari when he worked in the Valdichiana. Around 1569 he executed the altarpiece based on Vasari's design for the high altar of the Temple of Santo Stefano della Vittoria at Pozzo della Chiana, Arezzo. Porta died in Monte San Savino in 1616. His painting style is characterised by compositional balance and a refined use of colour, both typical traits of late Mannerist Tuscan painting. A large range of different types of drawings by Porta have survived in the Vasari Album now housed in the collection of Sir John Soane's Museum in London.

== Bibliography ==
- Bryan, Michael (1889). Walter Armstrong & Robert Edmund Graves (ed.). Dictionary of Painters and Engravers, Biographical and Critical. Vol. II L-Z. London: George Bell and Sons. p. 311.
- Fairbairn, Lynda (2001). "Orazio Porta circa 1540-1616. A new draughtsman in the circle of Giorgio Vasari". Publications de l'École française de Rome. 284: 609–644.
- "Porta, Orazio". Benezit Dictionary of Artists. Oxford: Oxford University Press. 2011. doi:10.1093/benz/9780199773787.article.B00144766.
