= Onorio Marinari =

Italian painter (1627–1715)

- Self-portrait (1709), oil on canvas, 72 x 58 cm, Florence, Uffizi
- Born: 31 October 1627; Florence, Grand Duchy of Tuscany
- Died: 5 January 1715 (aged 87); Florence, Grand Duchy of Tuscany
- Education: Carlo Dolci; Baldassare Franceschini
- Known for: Painting and Printmaking
- Movement: Baroque
- Patrons: House of Medici

Onorio Marinari (31 October 1627 – 5 January 1715) was an Italian painter and printmaker of the Baroque period, active mainly in Florence. He was deeply influenced by his cousin, Carlo Dolci, under whom he trained, and by the work of Florentine Baroque painters Simone Pignoni and Francesco Furini.

== Biography ==
=== Early life and education ===
Onorio Marinari was born in Florence on 31 October 1627 to the painter Sigismondo di Pietro Marinari and his wife Maddalena Guinterini. Following an initial apprenticeship in his father's workshop, he entered the studio of his cousin, Carlo Dolci, the most important artist in seventeenth-century Florence. Marinari's period in Dolci's studio left some remarkable and indelible traces in his artistic formation. Francesco Saverio Baldinucci in his Vite declares that Marinari became ‘a very able imitator of the delicate manner of Dolci’. According to Pellegrino Antonio Orlandi and Niccolò Gabburri, Marinari later studied under Baldassare Franceschini, called Il Volterrano. After absorbing Dolci's meticulous, refined style, Marinari's studies with Franceschini introduced him to a Baroque dynamism, softer chiaroscuro, and fresco techniques. His artistic training was followed by a period of travels to Rome and in northern Italy which gave him the opportunity to familiarise himself with the works of Raphael, Correggio and Titian.

Marinari's first independent work, Christ Crowned with Thorns (1648; Florence, Oratory of San Niccolò del Ceppo) was heavily influenced by Dolci's style and was attributed to Dolci until the early 20th century. In the late 1640s, Marinari created a pair of oval paintings: St. Francis and its pendant St. Jerome. These works display the stylistic traits typical of contemporary Florentine devotional painting, particularly that of Dolci, Francesco Curradi, and Lorenzo Lippi.

=== Mature work ===
in 1648, Marinari became a member of the Accademia delle Arti del Disegno. He held significant positions within the Academy, being elected consul and councillor on several occasions. In 1679, he was granted the title of 'academician', a privilege reserved for well-known and highly regarded artists.

Mater Dolorosa (1670s), oil on canvas, 53,3 × 39,4 cm, Sarasota, John and Mable Ringling Museum of Art

The most notable of his early religious commissions is the altarpiece depicting the Flight into Egypt, created for the Church of Santi Michele and Leopoldo at Tinaia, near Florence (1660). While inevitably reflecting the influence of Dolci, the altarpiece is executed with chromatic skill and refined attention to form. It also reveals clear affinities with Correggio's work, which was highly regarded in Florence at the time, as well as strong echoes of Franceschini's style. The altarpiece depicting St. Maurus Healing the Crippled (1663–1666; Badia Fiorentina), Marinari’s first major public commission in Florence, demonstrates a clear desire to break with Dolci's influence. Its noble, classicising compositional structure, likely derived from familiarity with the paintings of Vincenzo Dandini, is complemented by the soft, nuanced rendering of the figures' flesh tones.

The altarpiece depicting the Transitus of St. Joseph, created for the Church of San Michele Arcangelo in Lucignano, dates to between 1668 and 1670. Through an ideal synthesis of the earthly and the divine, the figures appear to be enveloped in celestial light and are depicted in sacred, expressive poses. Dating to 1674 is the canvas depicting the Vision of St. Maria Maddalena de' Pazzi (Florence, Santa Maria Maggiore), which shows a clear influence of Simone Pignoni's use of heavy chiaroscuro and sfumato effects. In contrast to the canvas in Santa Maria Maggiore, the altarpiece of the Madonna of the Rosary with St. Dominic and St. Catherine of Siena (Florence, Santa Maria del Fiore a Lapo) is characterised by a more didactic and vivid style. Marinari's large religious canvases were met with great success, and his fame began to spread beyond his native Tuscany. In 1674, he was commissioned a portrait of St. Mary Magdalene de' Pazzi by a Neapolitan patron. The work is now lost, but according to Baldinucci, the painting 'captures the saint's likeness perfectly and is finished with such refinement that it brought extraordinary satisfaction to the commissioner'.

=== Later career ===
In later life, Marinari recurred to the compact technique and the enamelled images of his first master Dolci. This revived interest in his first master, testified in the 1680s, was undoubtedly dictated by the wish to become heir to the style of his cousin who had progressively quit painting four years before his death in 1683. To this neo-Dolcian period of Marinari belong some very high quality works of art, such as the St. Catherine of Bolsena destroying the Idols in the Modestini collection in New York and the St. Catherine in the Residenzgalerie of Salzburg.

Onorio Marinari and Andrea Scacciati, St. Agatha Emerging from a Floral Garland (1689), oil on canvas, 111 x 81,5 cm, Villa di Poggio a Caiano

In the mid-1680s, Marinari began an intensive period of work for the Medici court, especially following the death of Dolci in 1686. As Dolci's heir and direct follower, Marinari produced numerous works for the Medici family. The most notable of these are a pair of canvases depicting St. Agatha, framed by garlands of flowers, created in 1689 for the Grand Duchess of Tuscany, Vittoria della Rovere (Florence, Uffizi). Enriched by splendid floral motifs by Andrea Scacciati, these canvases demonstrate a complete adherence to Dolci's style. This is evident in the analytical precision applied to every detail, as well as in the intense spirituality of the figures, which radiate a sense of piety and devotion.

At the beginning of the eighteenth century, Marinari was primarily engaged in executing frescoes at Palazzo Capponi in Florence – a major decorative project involving leading Tuscan painters of both the older and younger generations. Commissioned by Marchese Alessandro Capponi, the nearly eighty-year-old Marinari painted a large room ceiling depicting Day and Night. The composition featured Phoebus in a golden chariot pulled by four horses plunging into the sea, contrasted with Night rising alongside the Hours, Twilights, and Dawn. In February 1707, Marinari realized a preparatory model intended for the frescoes of the "prima Galleria" on the piano nobile of the Palazzo. Shortly after receiving an initial deposit of roughly 20 scudi, Marinari interrupted his work on the gallery, likely due to his advanced age. The decoration of the gallery was later completed in the 1720s by Matteo Bonechi, who worked extensively throughout the palace.

After painting his self-portrait for the Medici collections in Florence (Florence, Uffizi) in 1709 and the portrait of the sculptor Giuseppe Salvetti (Ferrara, Fondazione Cavallini Sgarbi), Marinari began his final major public commission in 1714: an altarpiece depicting the Vision of St. Philip Neri during the Celebration of Mass for the Oratorian Complex of San Firenze. However, due to failing health, Marinari was forced to abandon the work, which was completed in 1715 by his pupil, Rendelli. Marinari died in Florence on 4 January 1716, aged 87. A man of diverse interests, Marinari devoted himself to the study of music and astronomy. In 1674, he published Fabbrica et Uso Dell'Annulo Astronomico, a treatise on gnomonics dedicated to Cardinal Leopoldo de' Medici, a prominent art collector and scholar. Marinari had several pupils, the most notable of whom was Bartolomeo Bimbi.

== Selected Works ==
St. Cecilia Playing the Organ, oil on canvas, 82×64 cm, Nationalmuseum, Stockholm_{;}

- Salome with the Head of the Baptist, Museum of Fine Arts, Budapest;
- Judith with the Head of Holofernes, Museum of Fine Arts, Budapest;
- Penitent Magdalene, 1640s, Galleria Nazionale di Parma;
- Veiled Madonna, 1650, Palazzo Corsini, Rome;
- St. Catherine of Alexandria reading, c. 1670, Wallace Collection, London;
- Mater Dolorosa, 1670s, John and Mable Ringling Museum of Art, Sarasota;
- Salome with the head of John the Baptist, 1680, Minneapolis Institute of Art;
- St. Cecilia, c. 1686, National Gallery of Denmark, Copenhagen;
- Mary Magdalene, 1699, Florence, Palazzo Martelli;
- St. Cecilia Playing the Organ, Nationalmuseum, Stockholm;
- St. Agatha, Framed by Garlands of Flowers, 1689, Villa di Poggio a Caiano;
- Self-portrait, 1709, Palazzo Pitti, Florence;
- Diana the Huntress, Uffizi, Florence;
- Flight into Egypt, Alte Pinakothek, Munich;
- Queen Artemisia, Bavarian State Painting Collections, Munich;
- David and Goliath, Museo Nazionale di Palazzo Mansi, Lucca.
Mary Magdalene (1699), oil on canvas, 51.3 x 38.7 cm, Florence, Palazzo Martelli

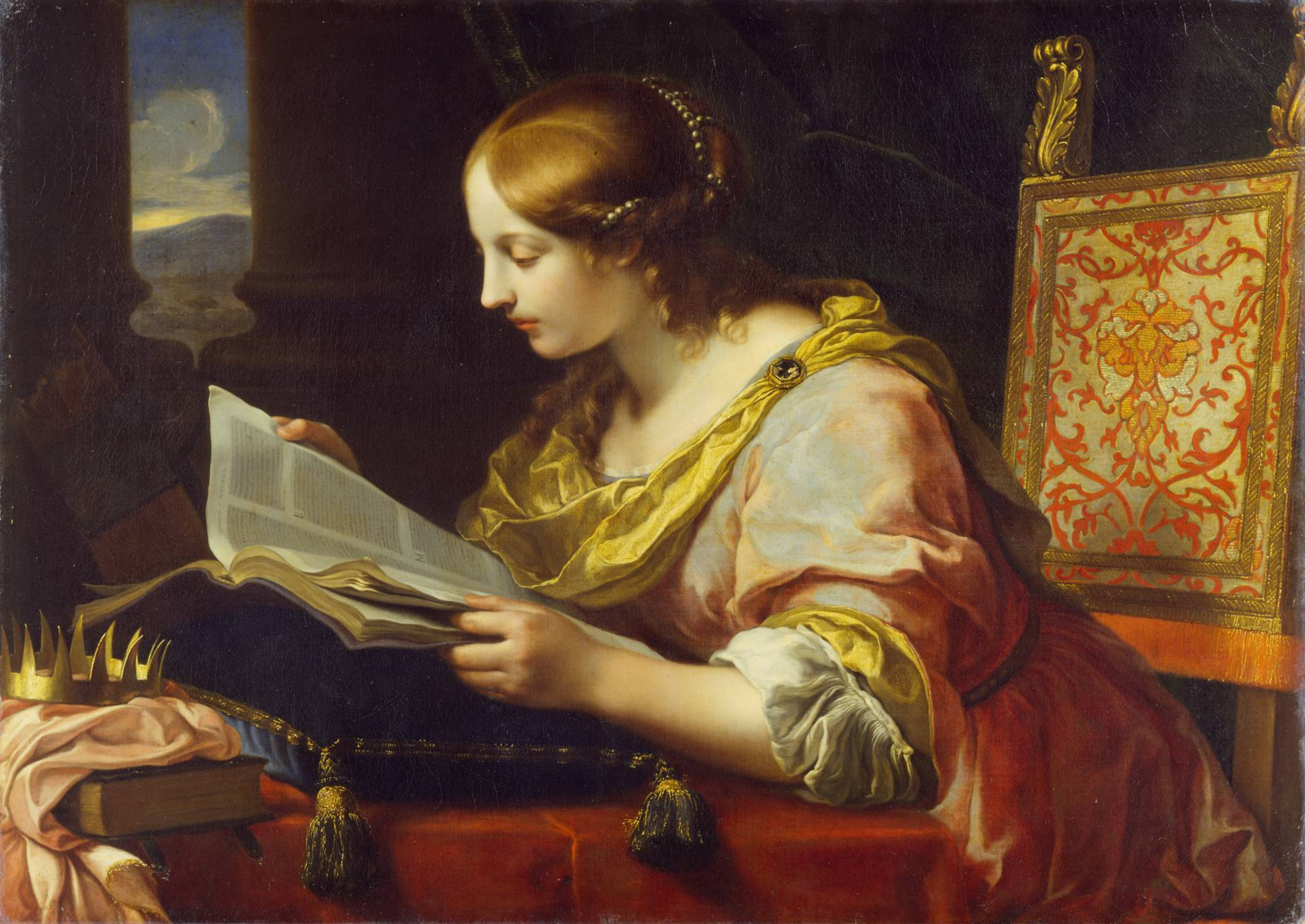
St. Catherine of Alexandria reading (c. 1670), oil on canvas, 775.2 x 106.4 cm, London, Wallace Collection

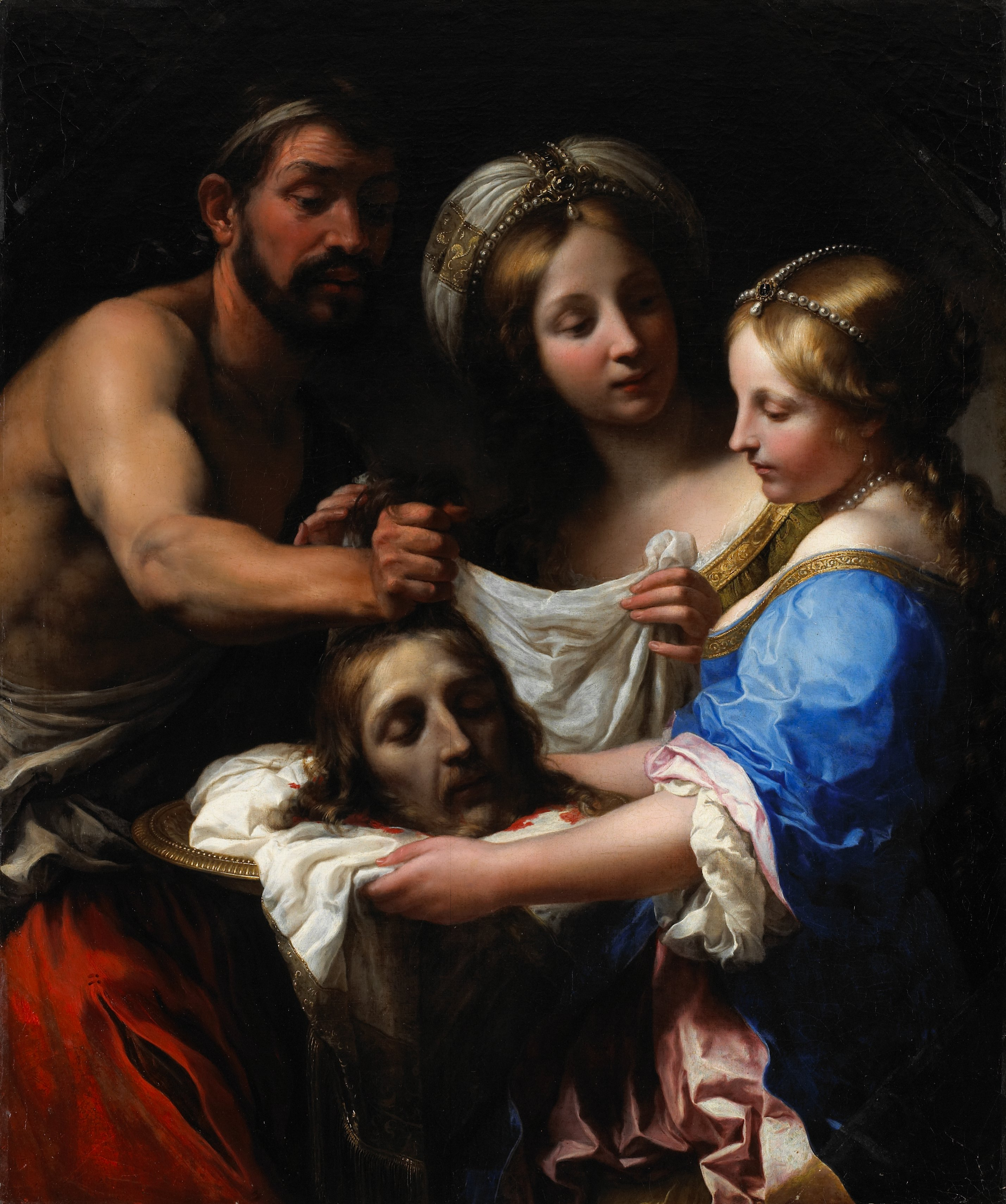
Salome with the head of John the Baptist (1680), oil on canvas, 142.2 x 127 cm, Minneapolis Institute of Art

St. Cecilia (c. 1686), oil on canvas, 75.4 x 57.5 cm, Copenhagen, National Gallery of Denmark

Penitent Magdalene (1640s), oil on canvas, 88 x 73,9 cm, Galleria nazionale di Parma

Apollo with His Lyre, oil on canvas, 88 x 74,5 cm, priv. col.

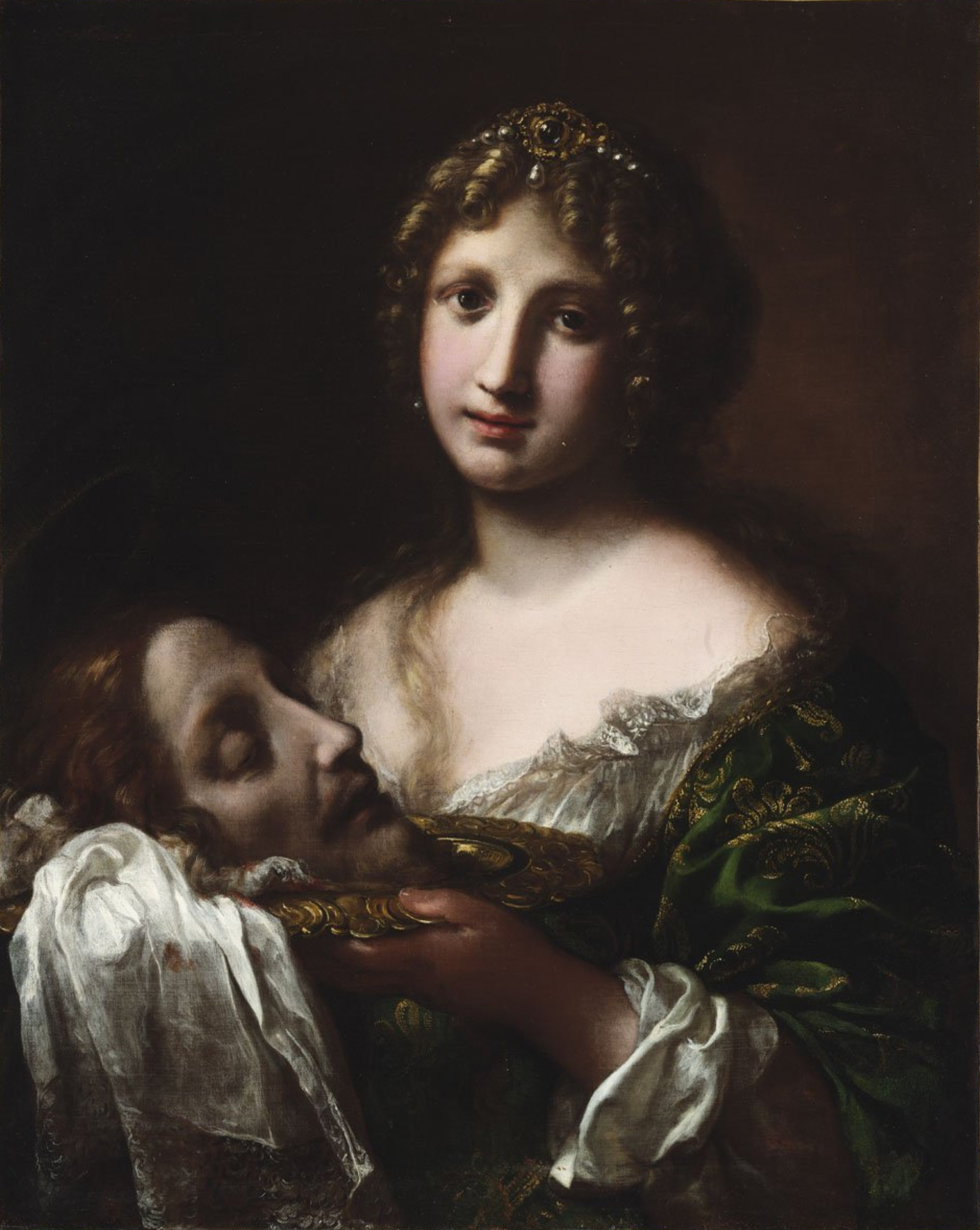
Salome with the Head of the Baptist, oil on canvas, 72 x 57 cm, Budapest, Museum of Fine Arts

Virgin and Child, oil on canvas, 92.3 x 74.2 cm, priv. col.

== Bibliography ==
- Baldinucci, Francesco Saverio (1975). Anna Matteoli (ed.). Vite di artisti dei secoli XVII. Rome: De Luca.
- Bruscoli, Paola (1986). Il Seicento fiorentino. Arte a Firenze da Ferdinando I a Cosimo III. Vol. 3. Florence: Cantini Edizioni d'Arte.
- Benassai, Silvia (2011). Onorio Marinari pittore nella Firenze degli Ultimi Medici. Florence: Mandragora. ISBN 978-88-7461-144-7.
- Bellesi, Sandro (2008). "MARINARI, Onorio". Dizionario Biografico degli Italiani (in Italian). Vol. 70: Marcora–Marsilio. Rome: Institute of the Italian Encyclopaedia. ISBN 978-88-12-00032-6.
- "MARINARI, Onorio". Web Gallery of Art.
