= Siege of Kanizsa =

Siege of Kanizsa may refer to:

- Siege of Kanizsa (1600)
- Siege of Kanizsa (1601)
- Siege of Kanizsa (1664)
- Siege of Kanizsa (1690)
