= Monterchi =

- Comune
- Comune di Monterchi
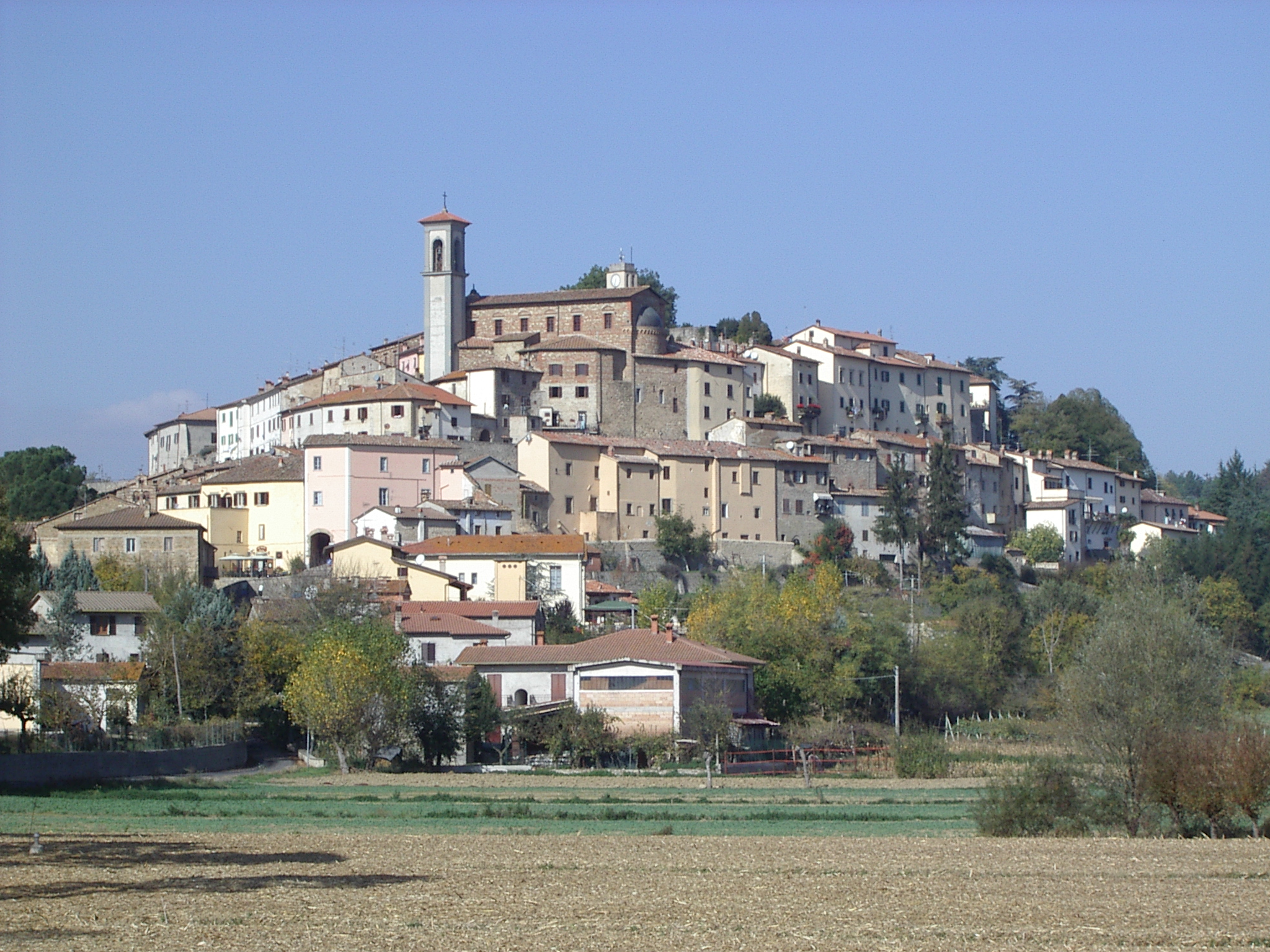
- View of Monterchi

- Coat of arms

- Location within Italy Location within Tuscany
- Coordinates: 43°29′N 12°6′E
- Country: Italy
- Region: Tuscany
- Province: Arezzo (AR)
- Frazioni: Borgacciano, Le Ville, Padonchia, Pianezze, Pocaia, Ripoli, Fonaco

Government
  - Mayor: Alfredo Romanelli

Area
  - Total: 28.7 km^{2} (11.1 sq mi)
- Elevation: 356 m (1,168 ft)

Population (2017)
  - Total: 1,742
  - Density: 60.7/km^{2} (157/sq mi)
- Demonym: Monterchiesi
- Time zone: UTC+1 (CET)
  - Summer (DST): UTC+2 (CEST)
- Postal code: 53035
- Dialing code: 0575
- ISTAT code: 051024
- Saint day: October 8

Monterchi is a Comune (Municipality) in the Province of Arezzo in the Italian region of Tuscany, located about 80 kilometres (50 mi) southeast of Florence and about 20 kilometres (12 mi) east of Arezzo. It sits in the northern part of Valtiberina (Tiber Valley), the valley where the Tiber river runs going from Emilia-Romagna (where it originates from the Mount Fumaiolo) towards Rome. The valley runs through Romagna, Tuscany and Umbria, parallel to the Casentino Valley.

According to census data updated on Jan. 2017, the city's population was 1,742 while the Comune covers an area of 28.7 square kilometres (11.1 mi^{2}).

Monterchi borders with Anghiari, Arezzo, Citerna, Città di Castello, Monte Santa Maria Tiberina.

== Toponyny ==
The name Monterchi (Mons Herculis - "Mount of Hercules"), seems to originate from a legend stating that the half-god Hercules founded Monterchi after beating the Hydra, a mythological monster with several heads. The history is still depicted in the coat of arms of the city's banner.

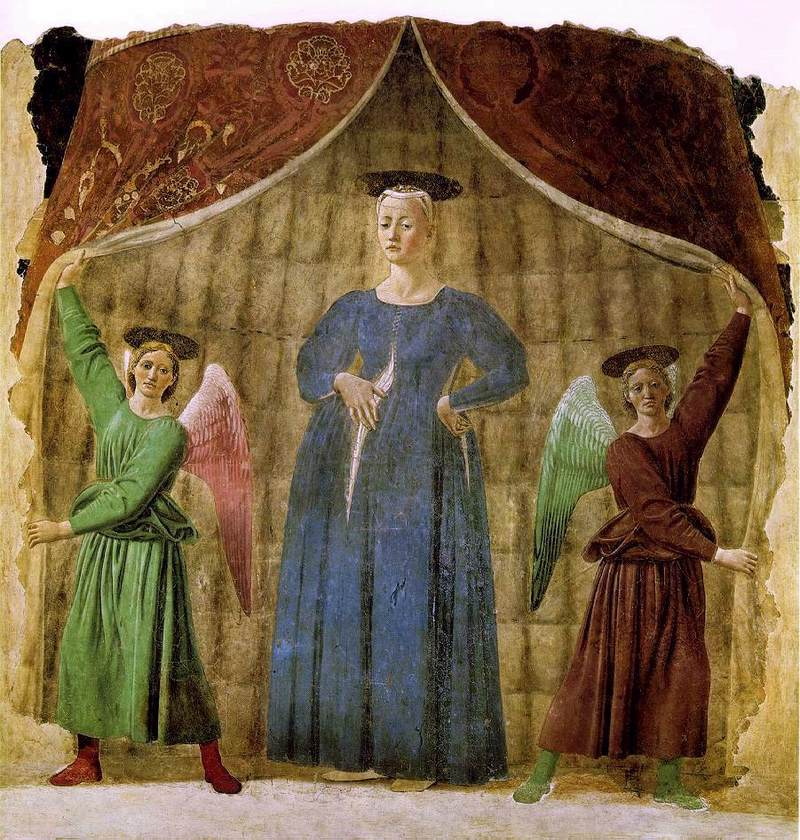
Piero della Francesca's Madonna del Parto. Museo della Madonna del Parto, Monterchi.

The most famous cultural attraction of Monterchi is the fresco of the Madonna del Parto by Piero della Francesca, painted between 1450 and 1465 in honour of the painter's mother, Romana di Perino da Monterchi, who was born in town and is in the Museo della Madonna del Parto di Piero della Francesca.

== History ==
Monterchi was originally a medieval town, perched on a hill overlooking the beautiful Tuscan countryside which spreads around in every direction. What remains of the great walls once surrounding the small village, traditionally built to protect inhabitants and assets from invasions and attacks by ravagers, let Monterchi maintain part of the suggestive appearance of a fortified town. Also some of the characteristics alleys typical of the towns built in the Middle ages are still visible, and they now provide shade from the hot Tuscan sun, while they used to be safer to guard and protect than larger ones in case of attacks.

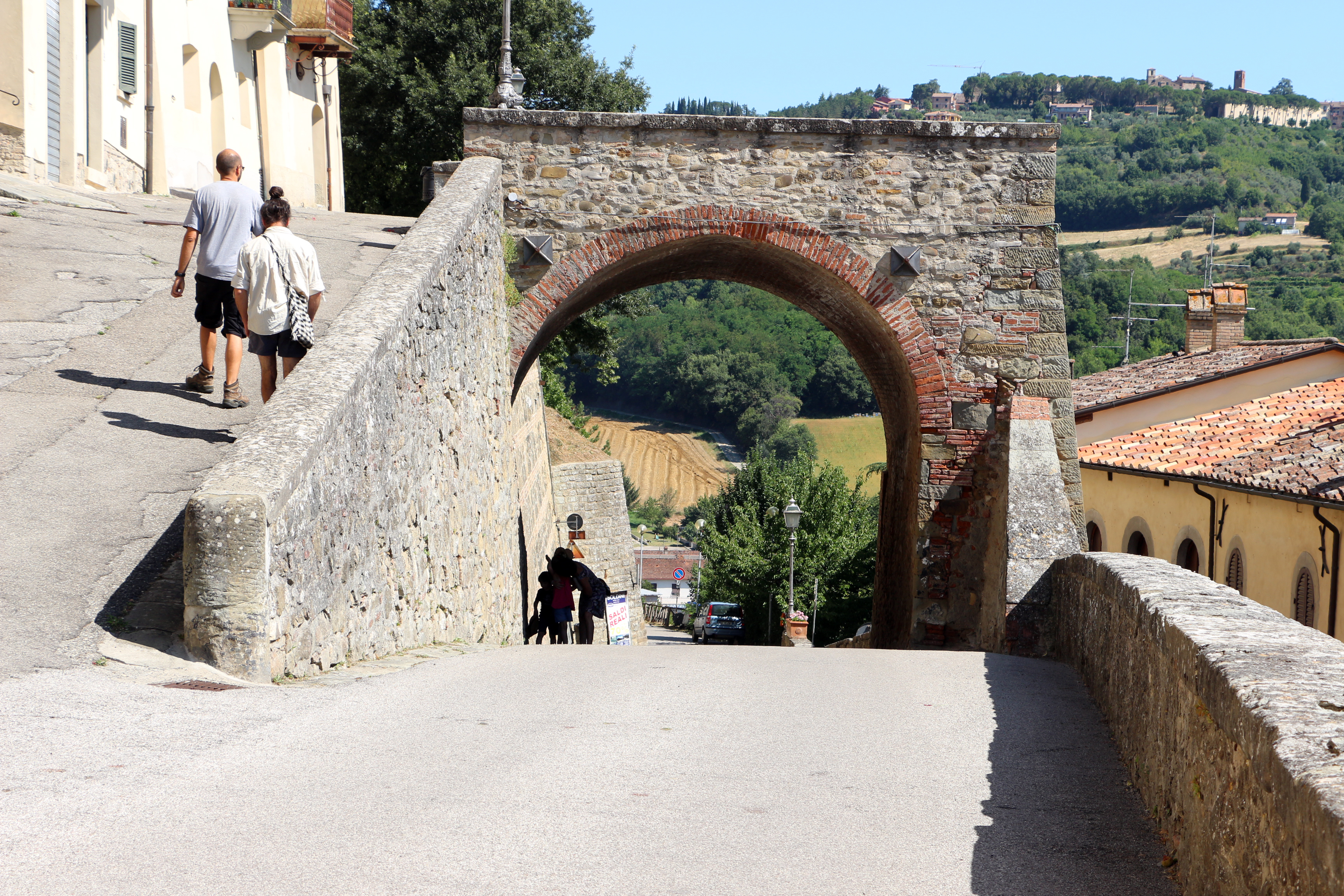
A view of the remains of the ancient walls and doors to the city.

Unfortunately, some violent earthquakes significantly destroyed the original structure of the town, among them, the most violent ones were the one in 1352 (measuring 6 on the Richter scale) and the last one, on April 26, 1917. This is the reason why the medieval structure of the town only partially remains today and most of the buildings were built after 1917, like the town hall by Giovanni Michelucci, in the main square of the town.

The new town has developed at foot of the hill, where the main street to go either to Arezzo or to Sansepolcro and Umbria runs.

Also at foot of the hill, the Cerfone is a stream along which cultural and gastronomic festivals are held during the summer, like the Polenta Fest, which takes place in September.

== Demographics ==
Historical population

Year	Pop.	±%
1861	2,798	—
1871	3,046	+8.9%
1881	3,137	+3.0%
1901	3,283	+4.7%
1911	3,282	−0.0%

Year	Pop.	±%
1921	3,413	+4.0%
1931	3,320	−2.7%
1936	3,374	+1.6%
1951	3,389	+0.4%
1961	2,823	−16.7%

Year	Pop.	±%
1971	2,022	−28.4%
1981	1,919	−5.1%
1991	1,913	−0.3%
2001	1,880	−1.7%

Source: Data from ISTAT

== Main sights ==
The panoramic terrace of the Rocca, located in the historic center of Monterchi, provides an expansive view of the surrounding countryside, which is characterized by sunflower field and tobacco cultivation.

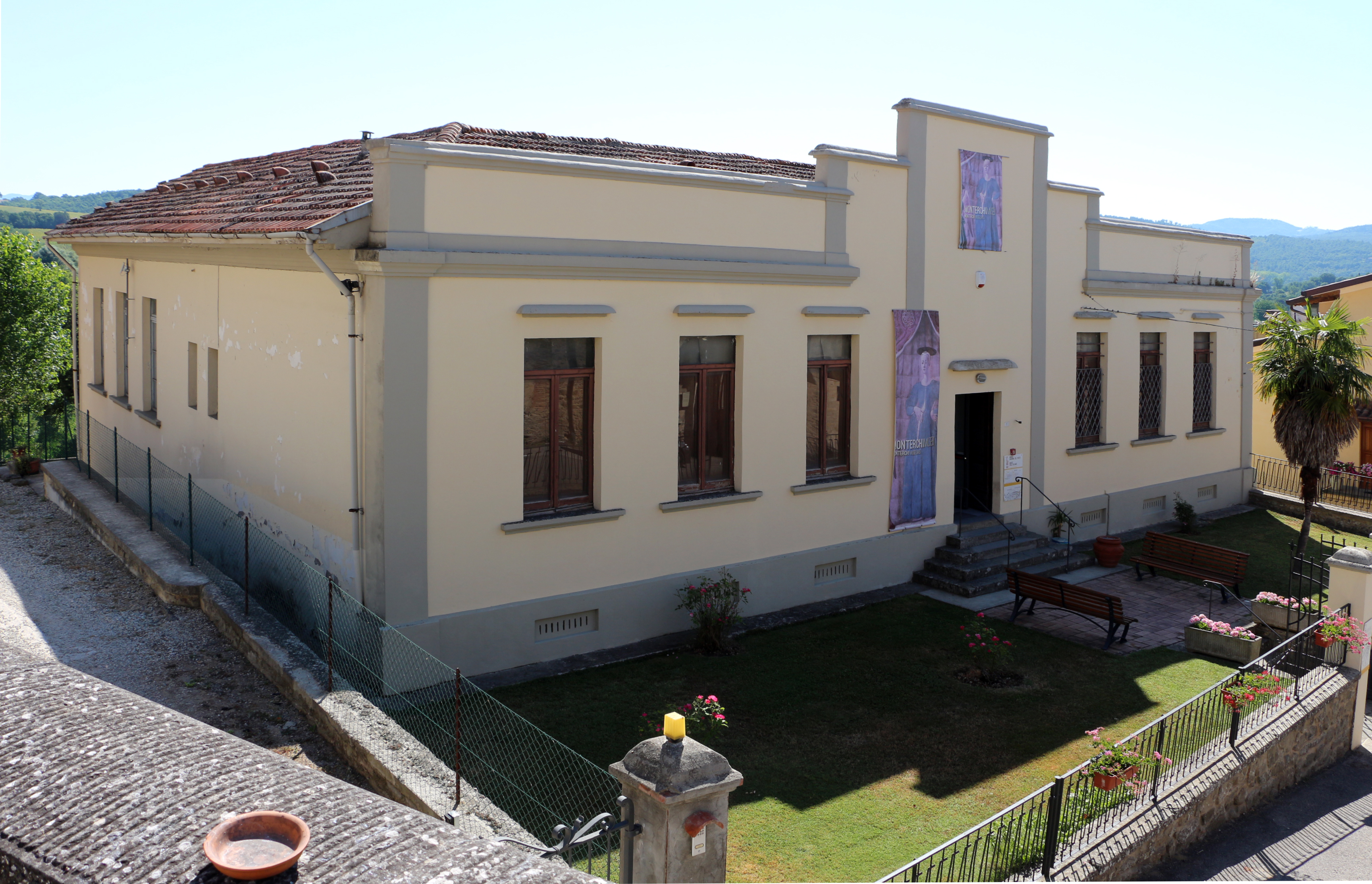
The Museo della Madonna del Parto, where the famous fresco by Piero della Francesca can be seen.

The main attraction of the town is the Museo della Madonna del Parto di Piero della Francesca where the Madonna del Parto fresco by Piero della Francesca is displayed after being taken down from the wall of the Chapel of Santa Maria di Momentana by the local cemetery.

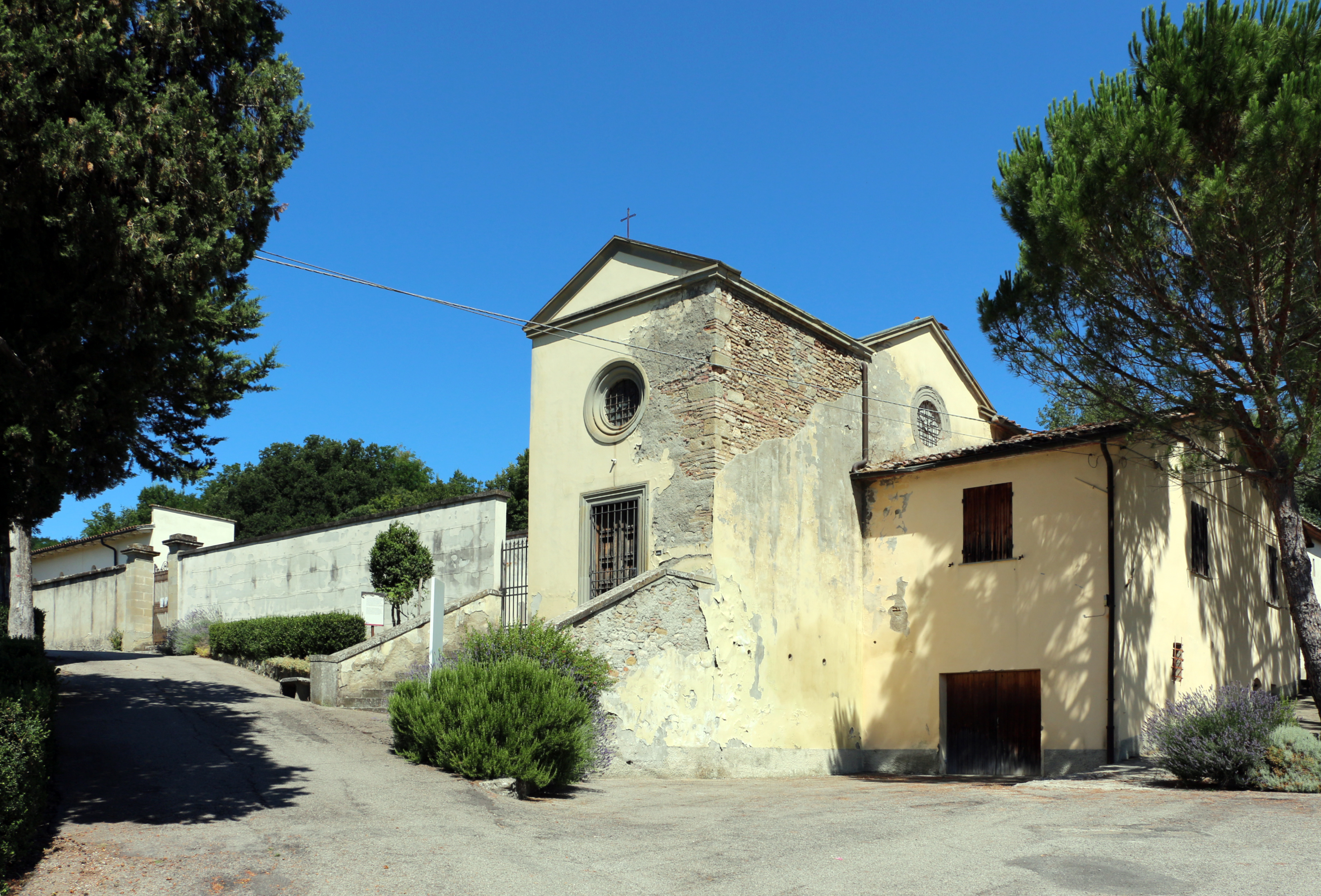
The Church of Santa Maria a Momentana, Monterchi. This is the original chapel Piero della Francesca painted his famous fresco for.

Interesting is also The Scales Museum, house of one of the most important collections of scales and weights in Europe.

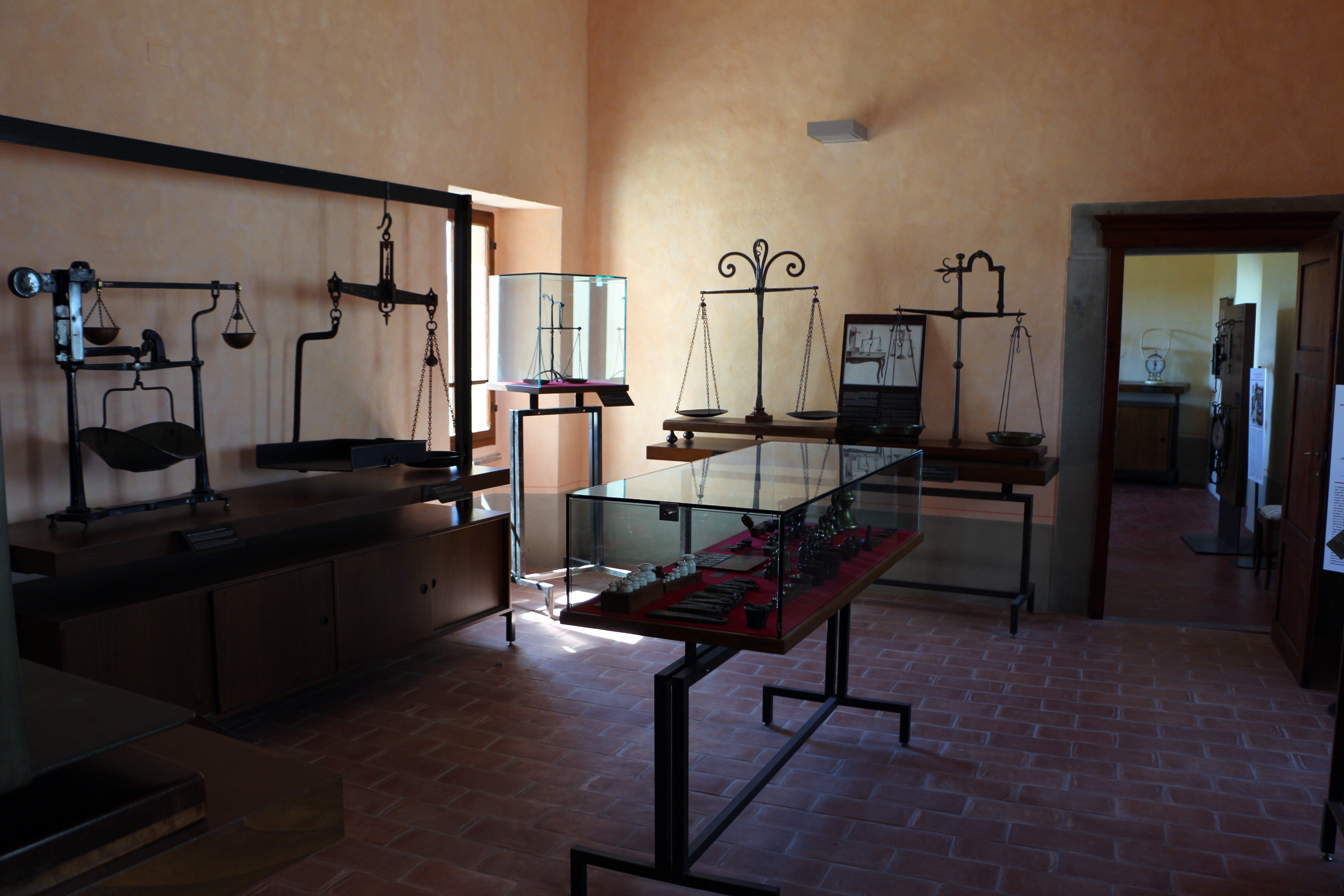
The Scales museum, Monterchi

Many are the churches worth a visit.

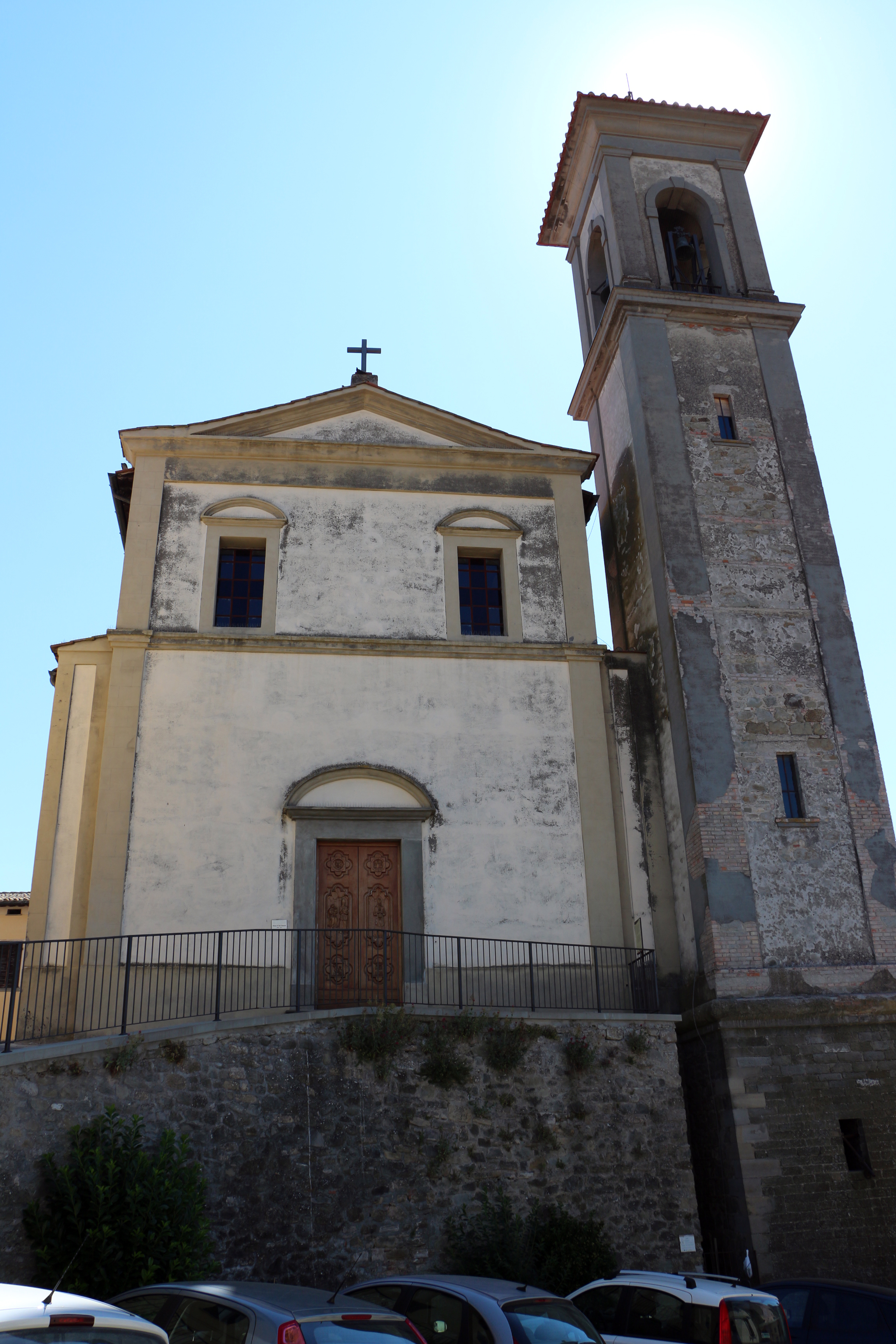
The Church of San Simeone, Monterchi

Church of San Simeone, dating back to the Middle Ages. In 1830 it has been completely demolished and rebuilt and it was subsequently seriously damaged by the earthquake in 1917. It hosts a wooden crucifix and a ciborium in polychrome terracotta from the 15th century and a stone pulpit depicting Hercules killing the Hydra from the 16th century.

Church of San Michele Arcangelo (St. Michael the Archangel) is a little outside the center of town, in the hamlet of Padonchia. It hosts many paintings depicting various saints such as St. Christopher and St. Sebastian, a noteworthy work depicting che Archangel Michael battling against the devil and ancient architectural elements such as four figured corbels sustaining the vault of the Presbitery. A Madonna and Child from the first half of the 1400s is also worth the visit.

Church dedicated to St. Michael the Archangel can be found in the nearby hamlet of Pianezze. Built in romanesque style, the Church has a wooden ceiling and a terracotta floor. The main attraction is the fresco painting depicting the "Madonna della Misericordia" (Holy Virgin of Mercy) from the 16th century and a "Pietà" in polychrome terracotta.

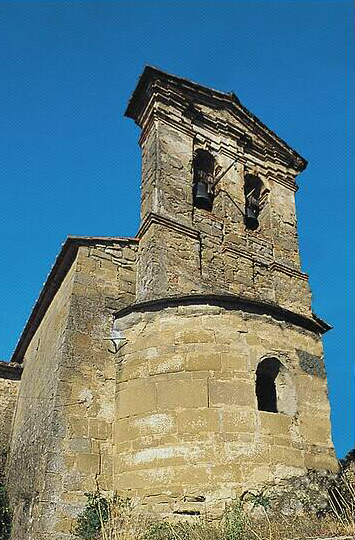
The Church of St. Apollinare in Monterchi

The romanic church of St. Apollinare dates back to the 7th/8th centuries and it holds the typical romanic structure: a nave, a semi-circular apse and a gable. The latter has then been decorated in the Seventeenth century.

Church of St. Mary in Scandolaia, another hamlet near Monterchi, lies near the ruins of the Montagutello castle, on the slopes of Mount Felcino. It's maybe the oldest Church in the area, dating back to the 12th century. The wooden sculpture of the Madonna and Child which originally decorated the Church has now been moved to the Church of Le Ville.

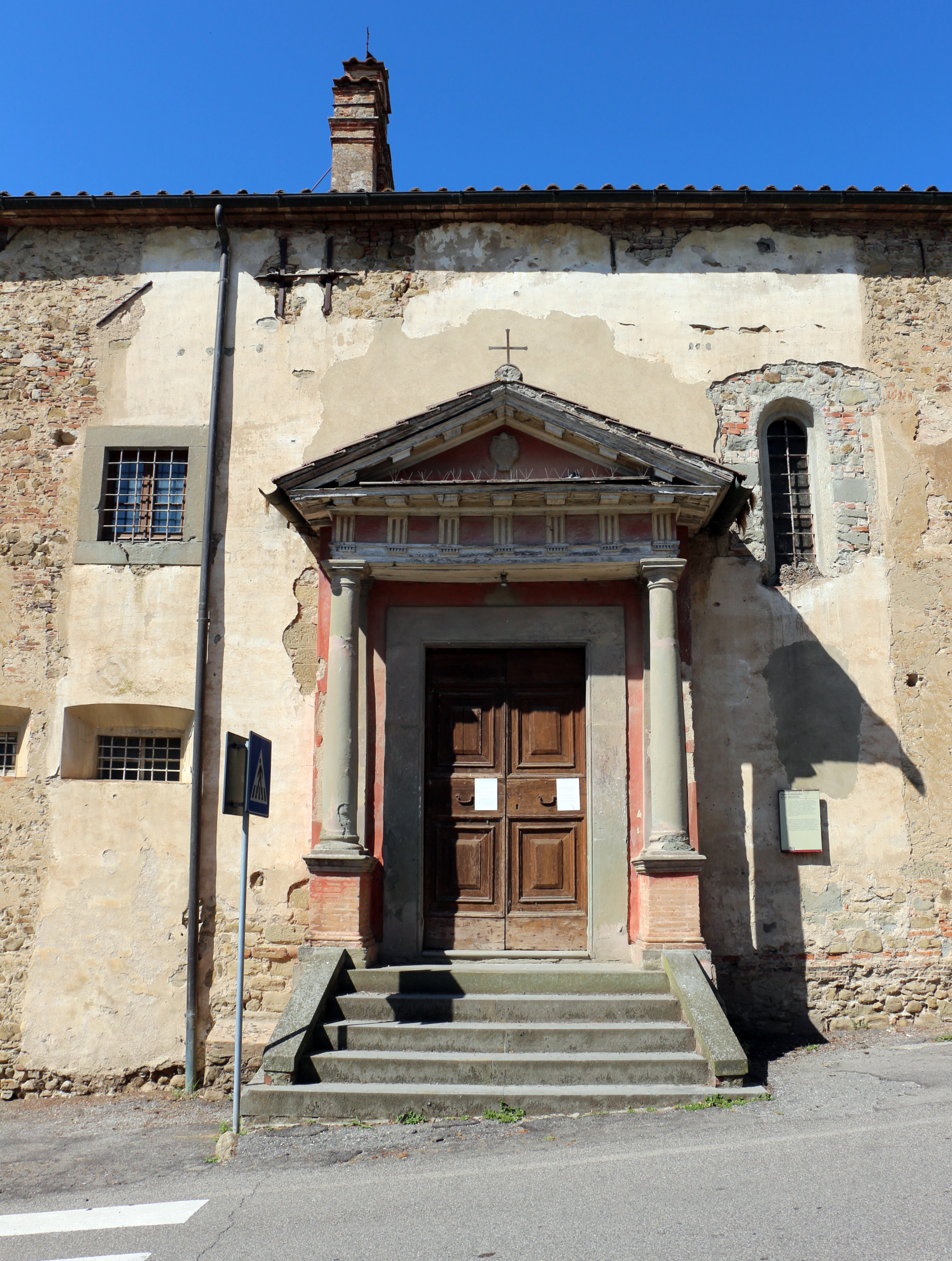
The monastery of San Benedetto in Monterchi

Church of San Benedetto is part of a monastery that is said to have been built on the foundations of a preexisting hospital for wayfarers and sick men. The Church was completely renewed in the 16th century after the monastery had been destroyed during a local war. In 1840 the Church was renewed again by adding the columns at the entrance and the decorations on the facade, the plaster decoration of the interior and the marble altar.

Church of the Madonna Bella (Beautiful Virgin Mary) is in Pocaia, and was originally built around the first half of the 16th century to be an oratory dedicated to the Holy Virgin. It hosts a beautiful terracotta in the style of Andrea Della Robbia which is believed to protect from car accidents.

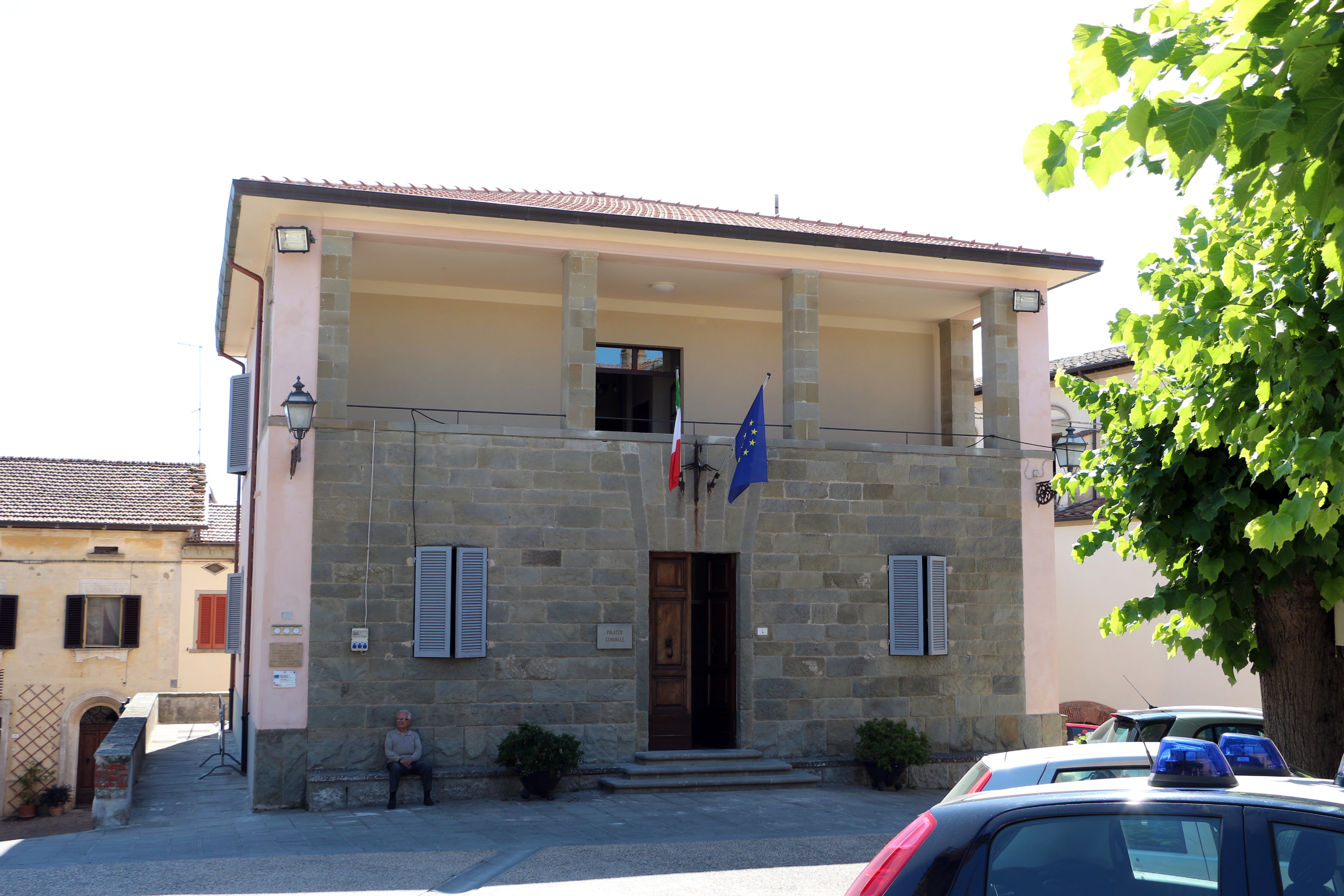
The Town Hall in Monterchi

Coming to more recent works, a significant palace within Monterchi is certainly the Town Hall, a project by the famous Florentine architect Giovanni Michelucci which has long been forgotten to be his creature, probably even by himself. Built right before World War II, the paternity of the building has only recently made known to the public at large.

=== Churches ===
- Chapel of Santa Maria di Momentana
- Church of Sant'Apollinare
- Church of San Simeone
- Church of San Benedetto
- Church of San Michele Arcangelo (St. Michael the Archangel) in Padonchia
- Church of San Michele Arcangelo (St. Michael the Archangel) in Pianezze
- Church of the Madonna Bella (Beautiful Virgin Mary)
- Church of Santa Maria in Scandolaia

=== Museums ===
- Museo della Madonna del Parto di Piero della Francesca
- The Scales Museum

=== Theaters ===
- Community Theater

=== Buildings ===
- Town Hall
