= Battle of Zsarnóca =

1664 battle between Austria and the Ottoman Empire

Coordinates: 48.580°N 18.860°E

- Part of the Austro-Turkish War (1663–1664)
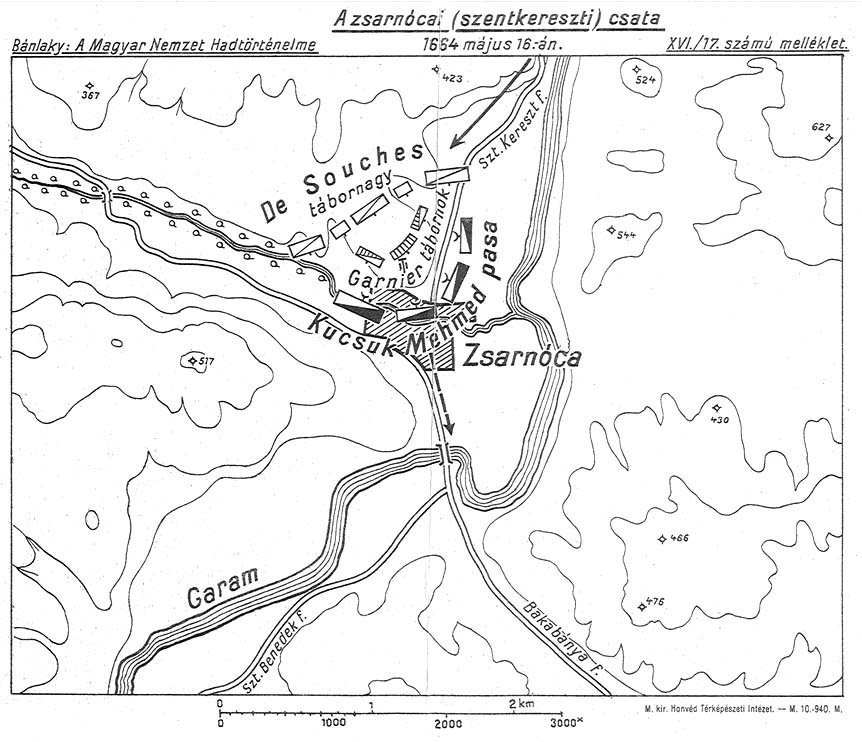
- The battle of Zsarnóca, by Bánlaky
Date	May 16, 1664
Location	Žiar nad Hronom (now Slovakia)
Result	Habsburg victory

Belligerents
Habsburg Monarchy	Ottoman Empire

Commanders and leaders
Jean-Louis Raduit de Souches	Kücsük Mehmed Pasha †

Strength
11,000	15,000

Casualties and losses
Unknown	Heavy

The Battle of Zsarnóca took place on May 16, 1664, between an Austrian division commanded by General Jean-Louis Raduit de Souches with 11,000 troops and an Ottoman division commanded by Kücsük Mehmed Pasha with 15,000 troops. The battle ended in an Austrian victory and death of Kücsük Mehmed Pasha who fell in battle.

== Background ==
While the main Habsburg Imperial army was getting ready for the siege of Kanizsa castle in the south, the troops of Count Jean-Louis Raduit de Souches tried to block the advancing Ottoman army. Following the instructions of Palatine Ferenc Wesselényi, Jean-Louis Raduit de Souches occupied the city of Nitra on May 3 after a siege of more than two weeks. The Austrian army set out towards the town of Léva, crossing the Hron River on May 9. However, the Austrian plan failed due to a downpour that caused flooding, the Austrians had to turn back. While the Habsburg troops were preparing to cross the Hron River, a Turkish detachment under the command of Kücsük Mehmed Pasha arrived with some 15,000 troops, while the army led by Jean-Louis Raduit de Souches was smaller at 11,000 troops.

Jean-Louis Raduit de Souches decided to encircle Zsarnóca in order to reach Pukanec. Kücsük Mehmed Pasha set off toward the Austrians in an attempt to encircle them, and on May 16 when the two armies faced each other a battle ensued.

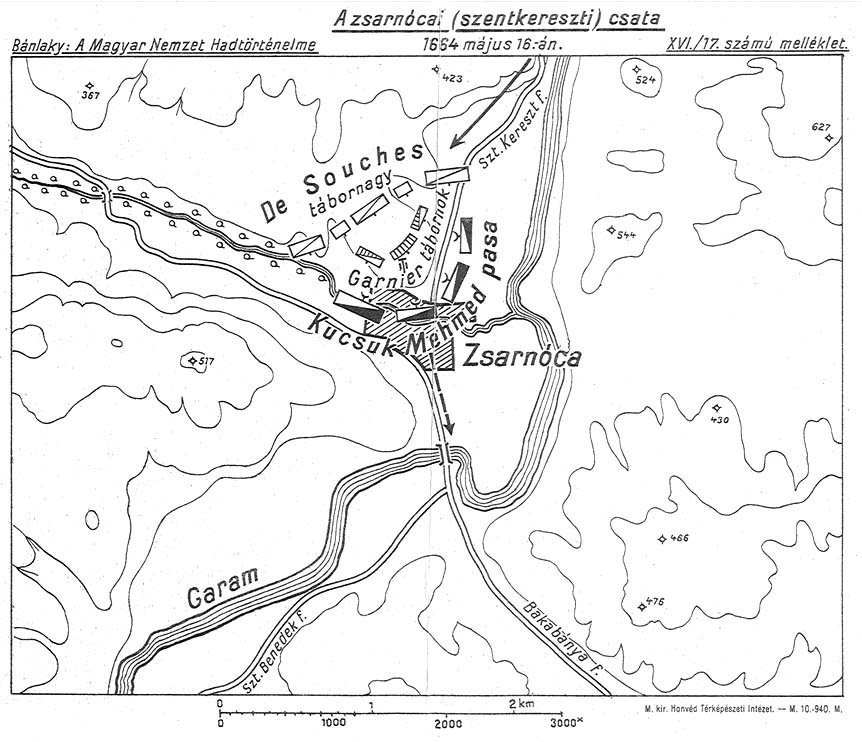
Battle of Zsarnoca

== Battle ==
De Souches deployed his main force, some 8,500 men, in a convenient position on a hill and repelled the Ottoman attacks one by one. In the last attack, Kücsük Mehmed Pasha was killed and the Turkish troops tried to retreat. De Souches seized the opportunity and went on the offensive, pushing the Turks back to the Hron River.

== Aftermath ==
The victory allowed de Souches to go on the offensive again. After the battle, De Souches took Léva castle and burned the bridge of the Danube at Esztergom. Then, he defeated the Pasha of Buda at Garamszentbenedek in a bloody fight.

While the Pasha of Várad was away from home, the Hungarian troops of Upper Hungary attacked Várad castle. It was the fight where Count László Rákóczi lost his life at the end of May.

== See also ==
- Jean-Louis Raduit de Souches
- Austro-Turkish War (1663-1664)
- Ottoman-Habsburg wars
- Siege of Kanizsa (1664)
