= Fighille =

- Frazione
- Location within Italy
- Coordinates: 43°31′10″N 12°06′30″E
- Country: Italy
- Region: Umbria
- Province: Perugia
- Comune: Citerna
- Elevation: 321 m (1,053 ft)

Population (2001)
  - Total: 421
- Time zone: UTC+1 (CET)
  - Summer (DST): UTC+2 (CEST)
- Postcode: 06010
- Area code: 075

Fighille is a frazione of the comune of Citerna in the Province of Perugia, Umbria, central Italy. It stands at an elevation of 321 metres above sea level. At the time of the Istat census of 2001 it had 421 inhabitants.

The name of the village is from Figulus potter's land (terra del vasaio, see figulus) because the village is located above a thick layer of clay and the extraction of clay is one of the main activities in the site.

Fighille placed in the Etruscan area, historically became the border in between the Papal State (Stato Pontificio) and the Grand Duchy Of Tuscany (Gran Ducato Di Toscana) and for a period of time the custom was located in the centre of the small village, and used to collect import taxes. The building of the custom has been renovated by the local council by removing and destroying the most beautiful part of the building.

Famous for the annual festival of the Ciaccia Fritta (fried bread dough) has a long tradition of contemporary art developed alongside the festival and is one of the major attraction of the village. The Piccolo Museo (43.520156°N 12.1044638°E) has interesting modern art painting from famous modern Italian artists.
