= Pistrino =

- Frazione
- Location within Italy
- Coordinates: 43°30′34″N 12°08′50″E
- Country: Italy
- Region: Umbria
- Province: Perugia
- Comune: Citerna
- Elevation: 295 m (968 ft)

Population (2001)
  - Total: 1,460
- Time zone: UTC+1 (CET)
  - Summer (DST): UTC+2 (CEST)
- Postcode: 06010
- Area code: 075

Pistrino is a frazione of the comune of Citerna in the Province of Perugia, Umbria, central Italy. It stands at an elevation of 295 metres above sea level. At the time of the Istat census of 2001 it had 1460 inhabitants.
