= Madonna del Parto =

Religious depictions of the Virgin Mary

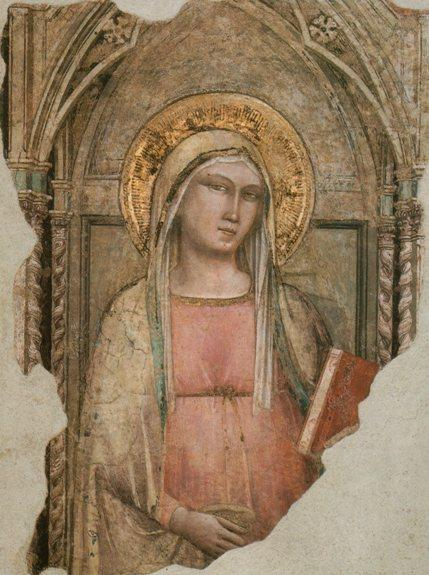
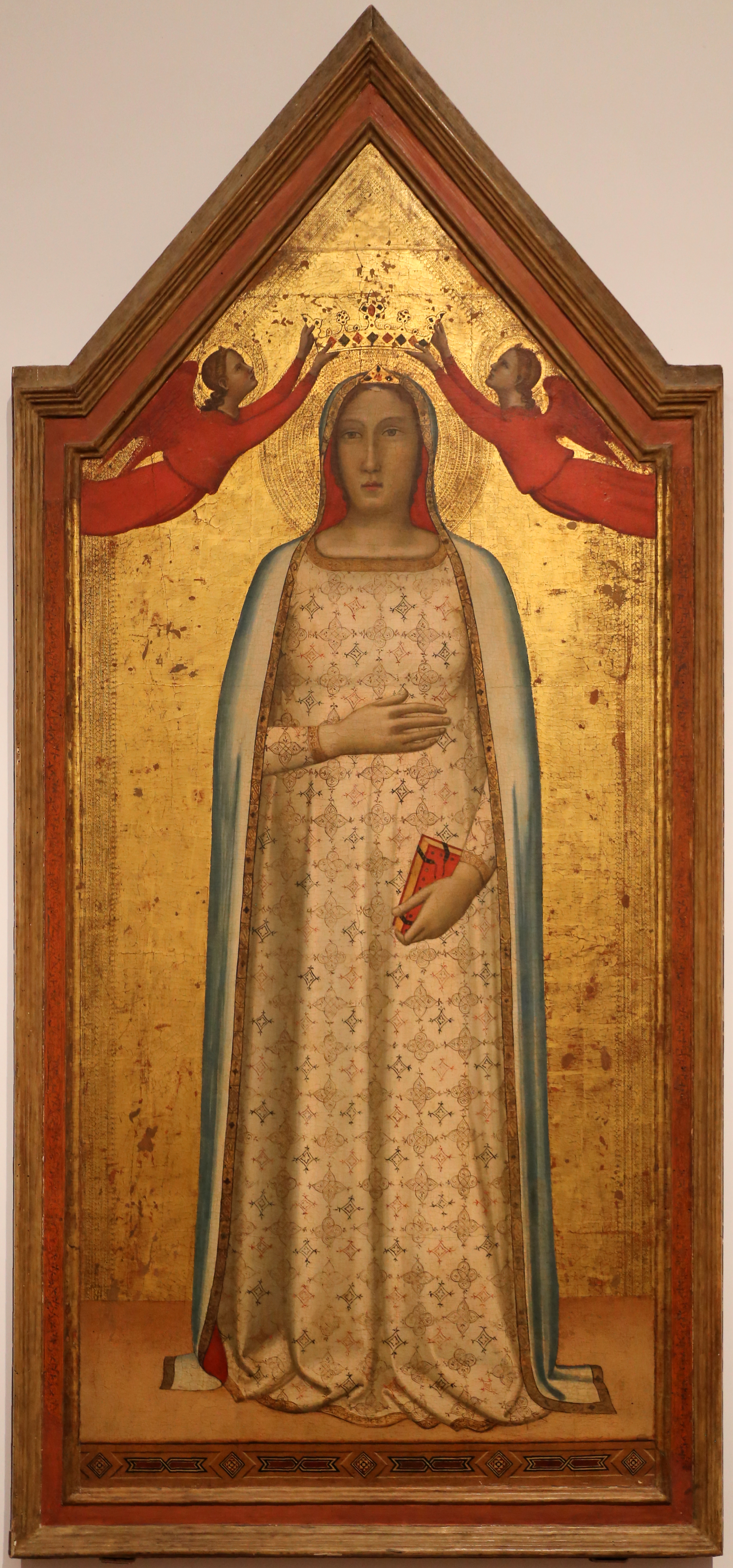
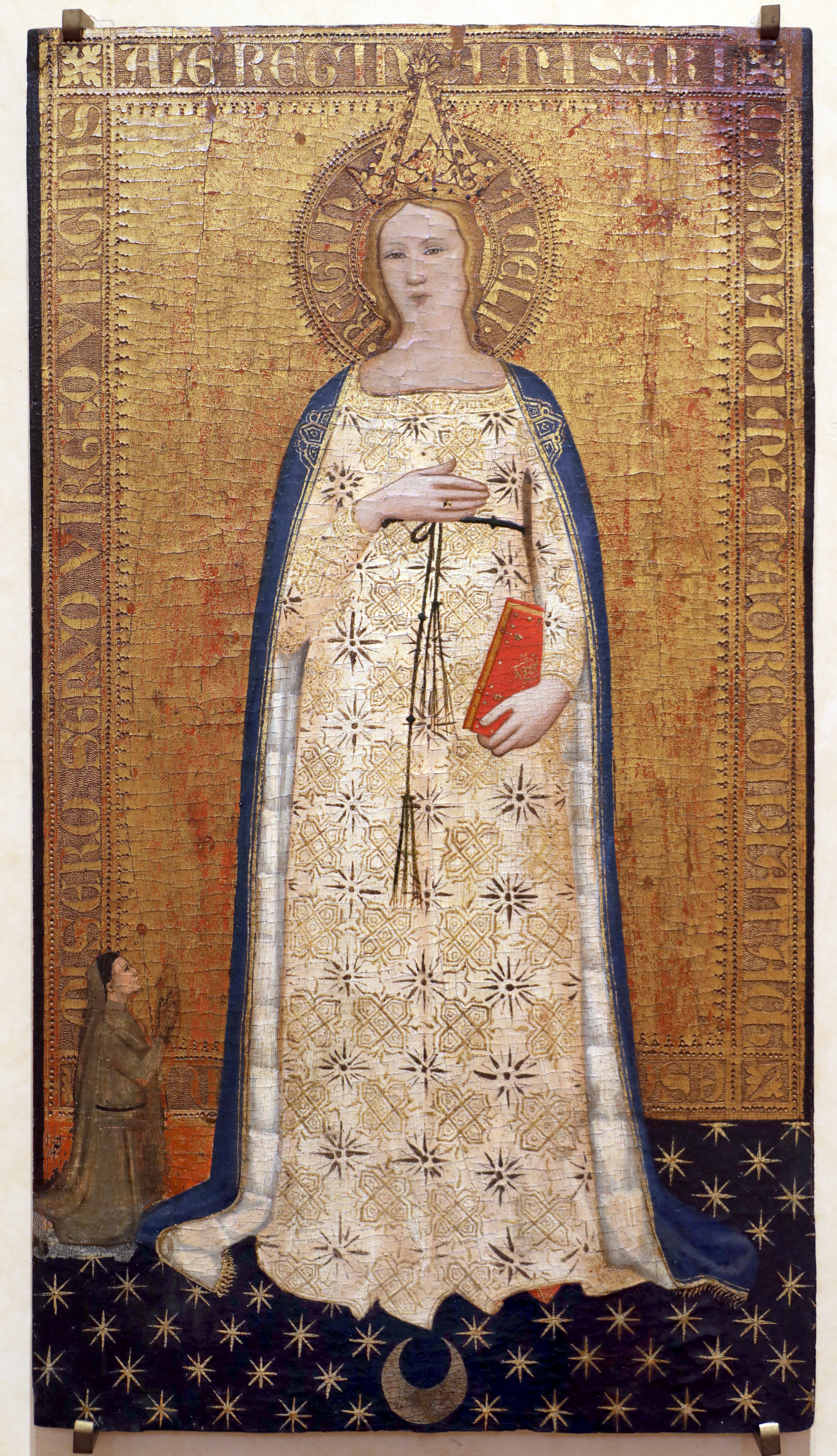
Madonna del Parto portrayed by Roman artisans Taddeo Gaddi, Bernardo Daddi and Nardo di Cione.

The image of La Madonna del Parto (English: Our Lady of Parturition) is a religious depiction of the Blessed Virgin Mary as pregnant which was popularised in Tuscany, Italy during the 14th—century.

Notable examples include works by Taddeo Gaddi, Bernardo Daddi and Nardo di Cione, but the fresco by Piero della Francesca in the Museum of Monterchi, in the province of Arezzo, is considered the most famous one. The Madonna was portrayed standing, alone, often with a closed book on her stomach, an allusion to the Incarnate Word. These works were associated with the devotions of pregnant women, praying for a safe delivery.

Sometimes, as with a statue by Sansovino in the Basilica of Sant'Agostino in Rome, the depiction is of a Virgin and Child, which was however known as a Madonna del Parto, because it was especially associated with devotions related to pregnancy.

Herein the Virgin Mary wears the Girdle of Thomas, a belt of knotted cloth cord that was a relic held in Prato Cathedral, which many versions show her wearing.

== Piero della Francesca ==
Madonna del Parto
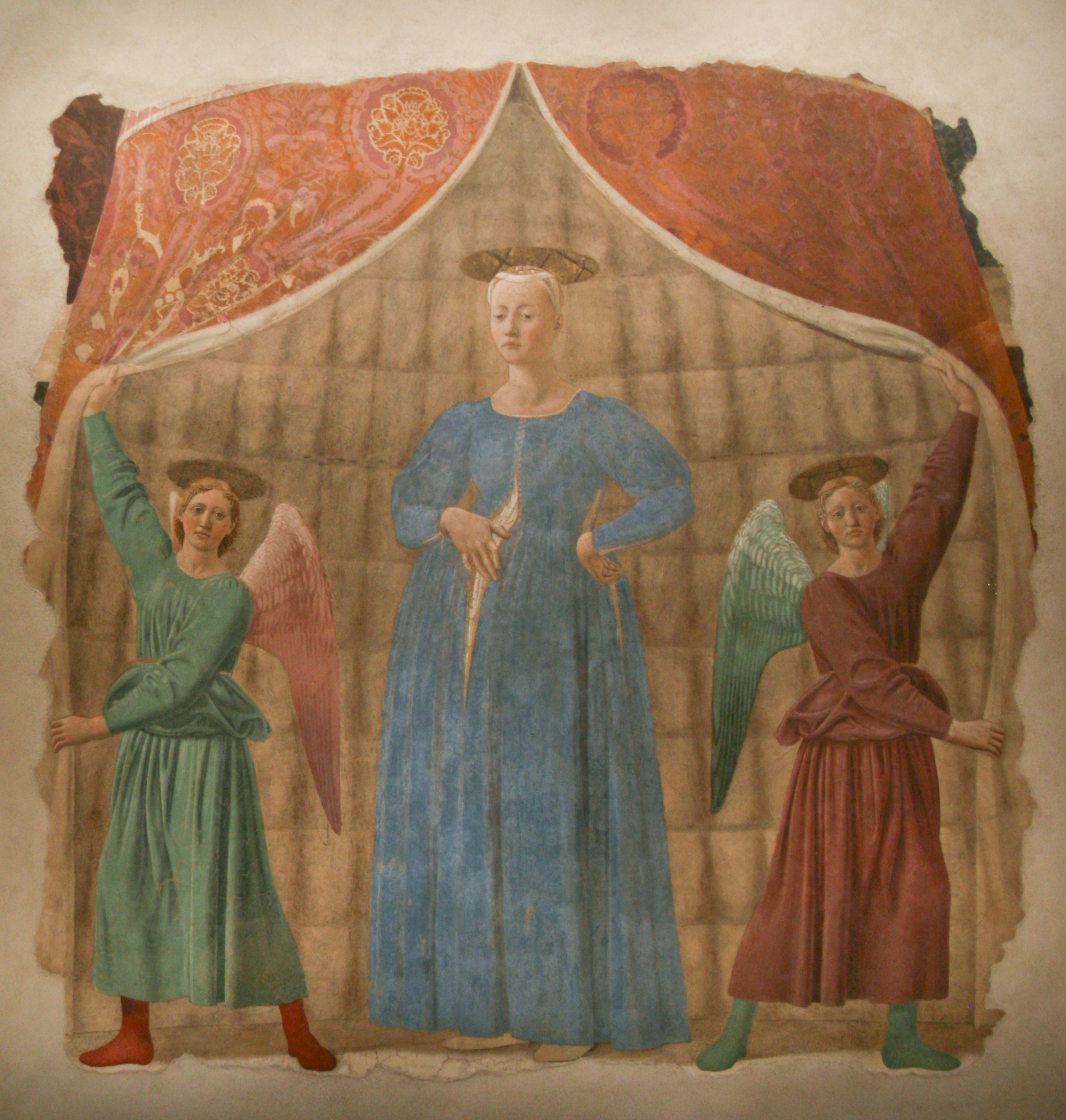
- Artist: Piero della Francesca
- Year: after 1457
- Type: detached fresco
- Dimensions: 260 cm × 203 cm (100 in × 80 in)
- Location: Musei Civici Madonna del Parto, Monterchi

The most famous work showing this subject is a fresco painting by the Italian Renaissance master Piero della Francesca, finished around 1460. It is housed in the Museo della Madonna del Parto of Monterchi, Tuscany, Italy.

Piero della Francesca finished it in seven days, using high quality colors, including a large quantity of blu oltremare obtained using lapis lazuli imported from Afghanistan by the Republic of Venice.

The fresco was at one time located in Santa Maria di Momentana, (formerly Santa Maria in Silvis), an old country church in the hill town of Monterchi. That building was destroyed in 1785 by an earthquake and this work was detached from the walls and placed over the high altar of a new cemetery chapel; in 1992 it was moved to the Museo della Madonna del Parto in Monterchi. It was only in 1889 that the work was attributed to Piero della Francesca. Its dating has been the subject of debate, with estimates ranging from 1450 to 1475. The 16th century artist and writer Giorgio Vasari wrote that it was completed in 1459, when Piero della Francesca was in Sansepolcro because of his mother's death.

The fresco also plays an important role in Richard Hayer's novel Visus, in Andrei Tarkovsky's 1983 film Nostalghia, and in the poem "San Sepolcro" by Jorie Graham. Gérard Grisey wrote a musical piece L'Icône paradoxale as a tribute to Piero della Francesca and this work, borrowing the title from an essay by Yves Bonnefoy on the same subject.

Piero della Francesca's Madonna has neither books nor royal attributes as in most previous versions of the image, nor does she wear the girdle. She is portrayed with a hand against her side to support her prominent belly. She is flanked by two angels, who are holding open the curtains of a pavilion decorated with pomegranates, a symbol of Christ's Passion. The upper part of the painting has been lost. The two angels are specular, as they were executed by the artist using the same perforated cartoons to copy them.

The theological symbolism behind the representation is complex. Maurizio Calvesi has suggested that the tent represents the Ark of the Covenant. Mary would be thus the new Ark of Alliance in her role as Mother of Christ. For other scholars the tent is a symbol of the Catholic Church, and the Madonna would symbolize the tabernacle, as she is portrayed containing Jesus' body.

== See also ==
- Pregnancy in art
