= Siege of Kanizsa (1690) =

Hapsburg siege of Ottoman castle

- Part of the Great Turkish War
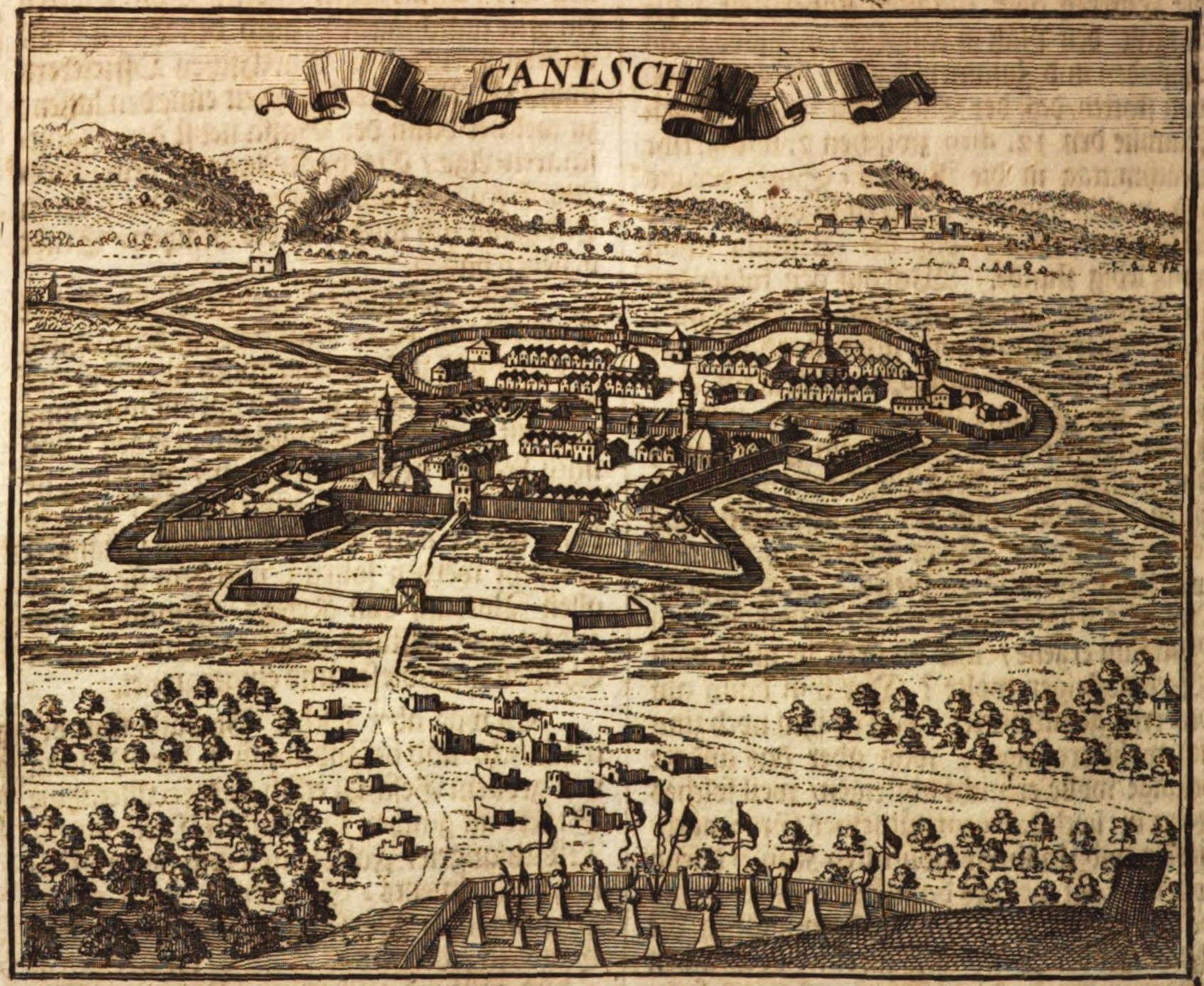
- Kanizsa during the siege (1700 German engraving)
Date	April 13, 1690
Location	Nagykanizsa, Ottoman Hungary (now Hungary)
Result	Habsburg-Hungarian victory

Belligerents
Habsburg Monarchy; Kingdom of Hungary	Ottoman Empire

Commanders and leaders
Adam II. Batthyány; Donat John	Bekri Mustafa Pasha

Strength
60,000	Unknown

Casualties and losses
Unknown	Unknown

The siege of Kanizsa took place during the Habsburg offensive in Hungary after the Battle of Vienna. The 60,000-strong Habsburg–Hungarian army captured the castle on April 13, and the defenders were assured a safe retreat.

== Background ==
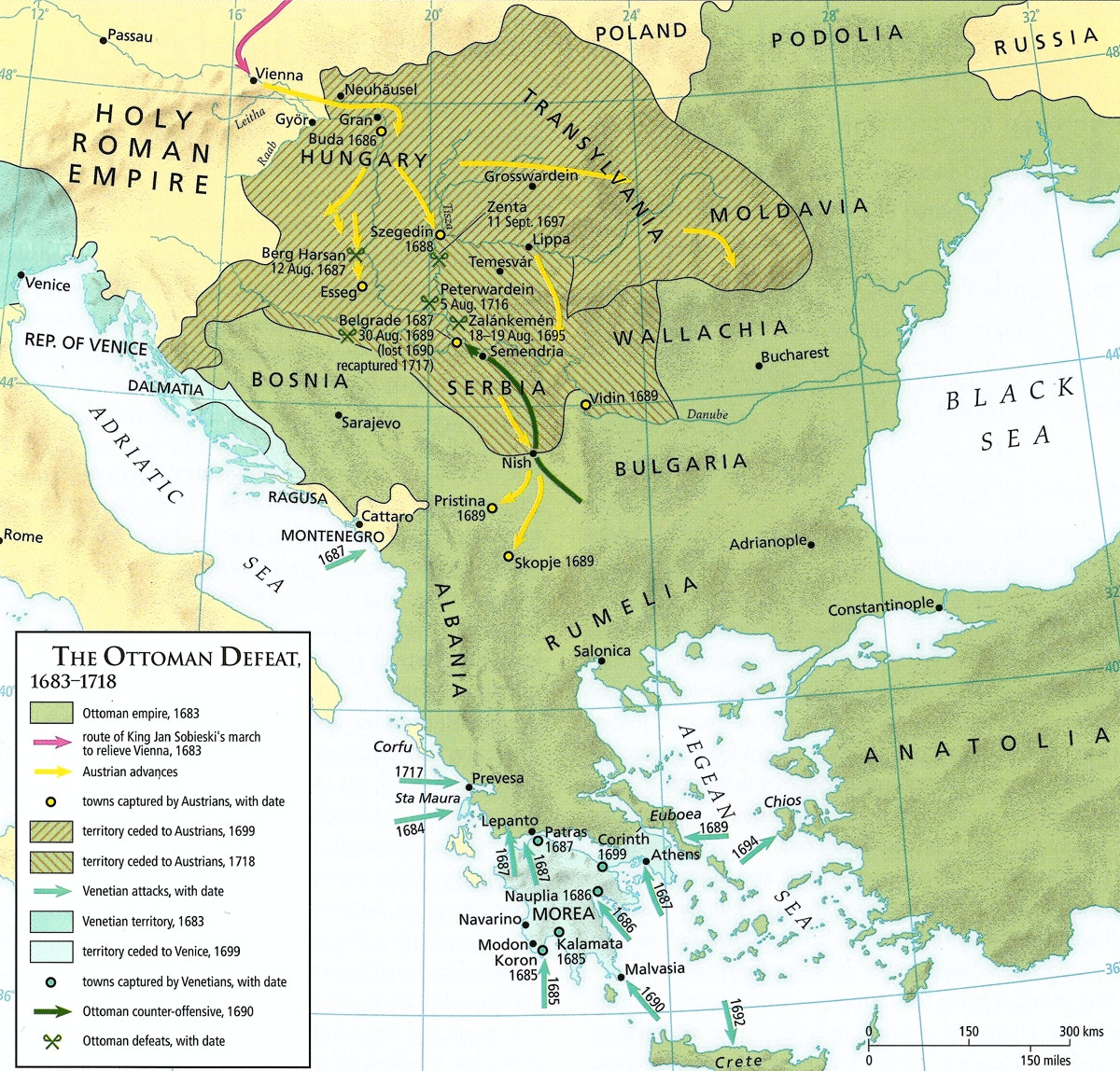
Reconquest of Hungary

Kanizsa Castle was a very important place during the Ottoman-Habsburg wars because it was located on the borders of the Southern Trans-Danubian region. The castle was captured during the Long Turkish War by the Turks after which it was made the center of a vilayet. Kanizsa served as a rallying point for raids and armed forays into Habsburg territories These raids were part of the Ottoman tactic of conquest first destroying the local infrastructure and then conquering the weakened territory.

During the Austro-Turkish war of 1663–1664, Austrian troops tried unsuccessfully to retake the fortress, but through poor supplies and lack of help from the Emperor, the Christian forces under Miklos Zrinyi had to retreat. The Viennese Military Council began to discuss the retaking of Kanizsa after 1689. They did not want to lose many soldiers so they decided to starve the castle out. The Emperor sent General Donat John and Ádám Batthyány, Chief Captain of the Trans Danubian Region, along with Colonel István Zichy and Colonel János Inkey against Kanizsa in January 1690. They had about 60,000 men under their command. They took the smaller fortifications around Kanizsa, then the blockade began.

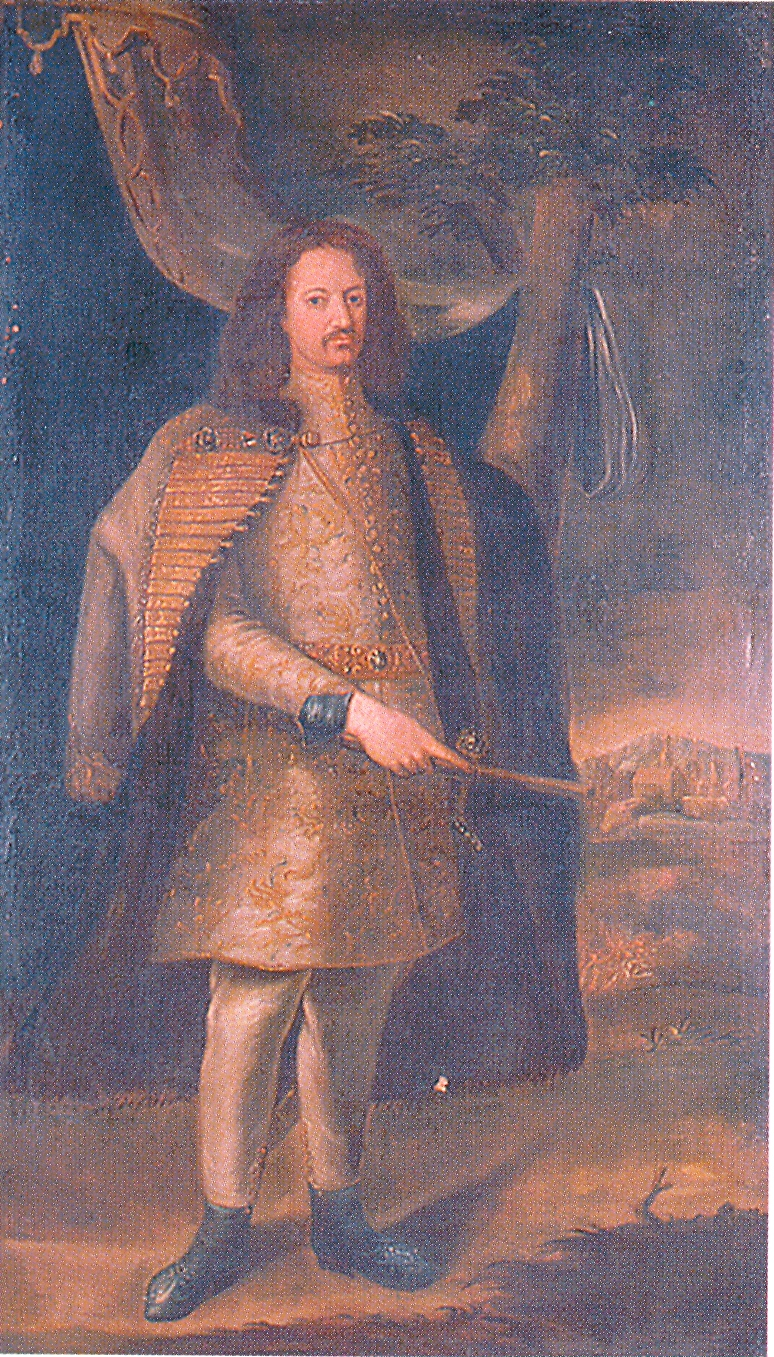
Ádám II Batthyány

== Siege ==
Soon after the blockade was established, the Ottoman garrison began to starve, so they sent envoys to the Pasha of Bosnia Gazi Topal Husein Pasha who was supposed to provide them with reinforcements, however, the Christian forces intercepted them which gave them a better idea of the situation in the Ottoman ranks. Batthyany wrote a letter to the Turks in which he described the numerical superiority of the forces besieging the castle and offered them surrender.

Yet the Turks did not agree to the given terms and responded to the Austrians with artillery fire. However, the situation of the Turks was hopeless, as the Austrians found out shortly afterwards when another messenger named Hussein was tried to be sent from Kanizsa with a request for reinforcements, he was also intercepted, in the letter the Turks announced that Kanizsa without military support would fall before Easter, Hussein, however, remained faithful and did not reveal any details for which he paid with his life. Hussein's head was cut off and impaled on a stake with the following script on it:

“You, Agha of Kanizsa had sent me out to bring help to this besieged castle. As I could not find any help on this Earth, I left for the other world to seek it.”

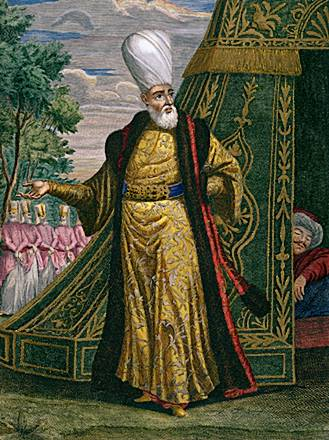
Agha of the Janissaries

The Turks noticed Hussein's head and realized that sending more envoys no longer made sense, also the situation in the besieged city became increasingly severe due to food shortages which forced the Turks to release most of the Christian hostages who were given safe passage to the camp. When the hostages reached the camp, they informed the Austrians about the hopeless situation of the besieged garrison, which only confirmed their belief in the helplessness of the Turks. The Austrians decided to once again propose surrender terms to the garrison, but they were rejected again and the Turks began another and final artillery bombardment.

Then, Bekri Mustafa Pasha had no choice left, and he began negotiating the terms of surrender. He sent two Agha officers to Donat John's camp on 20 March, they had a letter with 10 conditions in it to cede the castle. The talks lasted for several days. The next day, Mustafa released the remaining 72 Christian prisoners.

Mustafa finally set out to Vienna on 26 March with two Agha officers to sign the document with the members of the Viennese Military Council. In this document, the defenders were allowed to go away freely. Emperor Leopold approved the terms, and the pasha returned to Kanizsa on 8 April. To help the process, Donat John placed German and Hungarian soldiers at the gate of the castle. Then, Pasha Mustafa and his family moved to the outer town called Rácváros on 12 April.

== Aftermath ==
The Military Council had the fort mended and placed 1,200 Hungarian soldiers in it, they were under the command of Adam Batthyány. Later, they were replaced by German troops. Battyány protested against the order but it was in vain. He got upset and resigned. Emperor Leopold ordered the demolishing of the castle in 1702 in fear of a possible Hungarian uprising. Colonel Schenkendorff forced 1,500 Hungarian peasants with their wagons who had to do the job. The Colonel had orders to pull down the defenses of Egerszeg, and Körmend as well. He sent all the military equipment from these castles to Buda. By the time the anti-Habsburg Revolution of Prince Ferenc Rákóczi reached Kanizsa during the winter of 1704, Kanizsa castle had ceased to exist.

== See also ==
- Great Turkish War
- Ádám Batthyány
- Bekri Mustafa Pasha
- Donat John
- Ottoman-Habsburg wars
