= Citerna =

- Comune
- Comune di Citerna
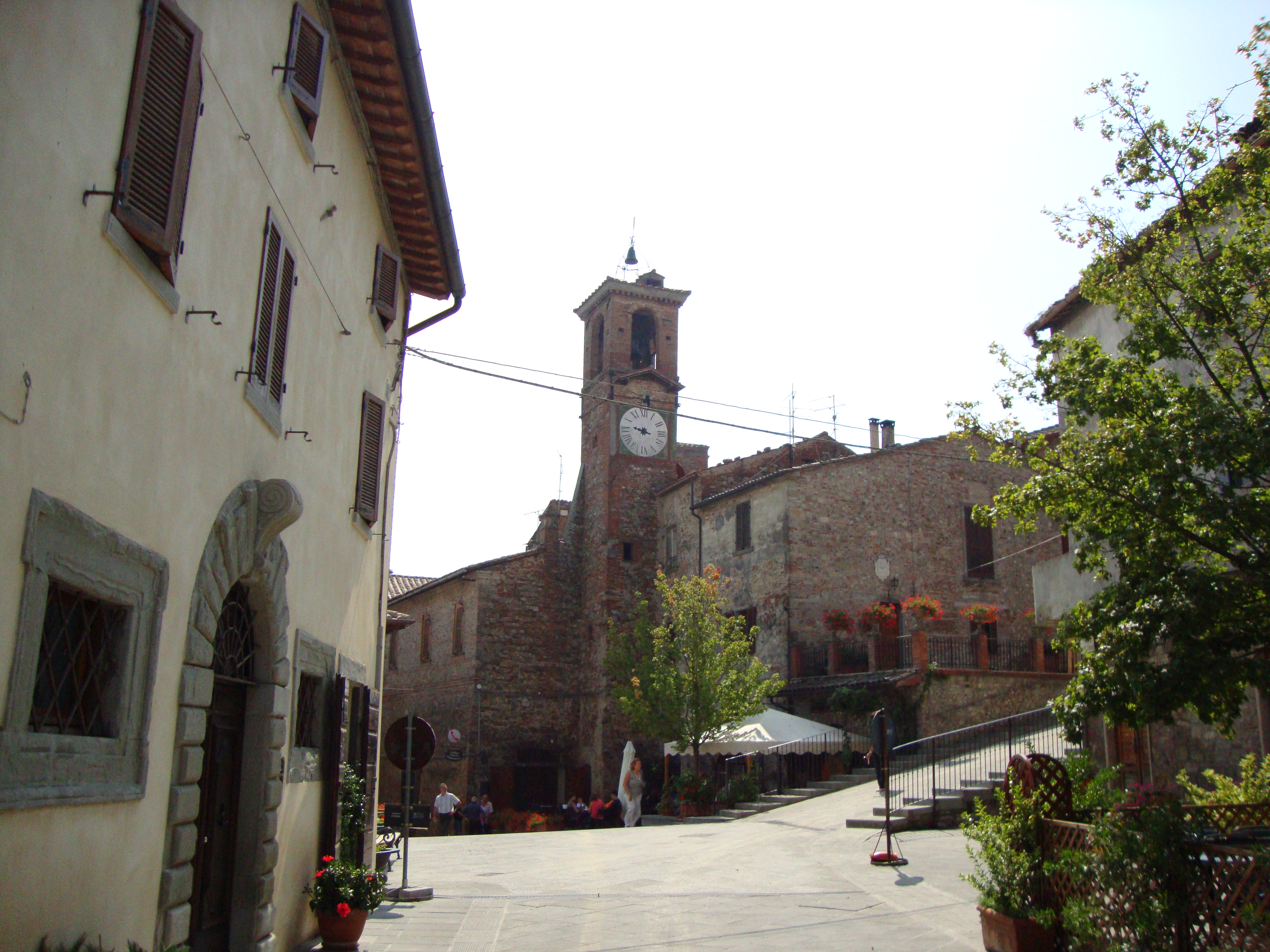
- View of Citerna

- Coat of arms

- Location within Italy Location within Umbria
- Coordinates: 43.498136°N 12.116458°E
- Country: Italy
- Region: Umbria
- Province: Perugia

Government
  - Mayor: Giuliana Falaschi

Area
  - Total: 24.20 km^{2} (9.34 sq mi)
- Elevation: 480 m (1,570 ft)

Population (1 January 2025)
  - Total: 3,400
  - Density: 140/km^{2} (360/sq mi)
- Demonym: Citernesi
- Time zone: UTC+1 (CET)
  - Summer (DST): UTC+2 (CEST)
- Postal code: 06010
- Dialing code: 075
- Patron saint: Archangel Michael
- Saint day: May 8
- Website: Official website

Citerna is a comune (municipality) in the Province of Perugia in the Italian region Umbria, located about 50 km northwest of Perugia.

It is one of I Borghi più belli d'Italia ("The most beautiful villages of Italy").

== History ==
According to local tradition, the present settlement was founded by populations fleeing their enemies. Having first settled near the river Sovara, they later chose a higher position, which they called Civitas Sobarie.

The castle of Citerna is recorded in the 11th–12th century, when it was held by the Marquises del Colle, later known as the Marquises of Monte Santa Maria, among whom were Guidone and Uguccione da Citerna, lords of numerous fiefs and castles in the territory of Perugia.

From 1215 it was repeatedly compelled to submit to Città di Castello and became involved in ongoing military struggles. In the early 13th century it was seized by the forces of Monteauto. Control later passed, in the late 13th and early 14th centuries, to the Tarlati di Pietramala of Arezzo.

During the early 15th century rule shifted to the Malatesta family of Rimini. By 1447 it was under Sigismondo Malatesta, former commander of the papal army. In the mid-15th century Sigismondo relinquished it, and the territory was incorporated into the Papal State. From 1464 it was subject to the Governor of Città di Castello through a commissioner.

The Vitelli family took control in 1482 after their exile from Città di Castello. In 1519 Pope Leo X granted the territory to the Vitelli as a marquisate, and their rule continued until 1584. A papal privilege of 1543 confirmed the judicial authority of the local commissioner. In the late 16th century the community statutes were revised and updated on the basis of a 1518 model; these statutes received formal approval from Pope Clement VIII on 6 February 1603.

The First War of Castro (1643–1644) caused severe damage to the population and territory.

In the late 18th century, under French rule, the community was established as an autonomous municipality within the Department of Trasimeno. Papal authority was restored in 1814, and jurisdiction returned to Città di Castello. In 1817 the community was recognized as a municipality attached to the governor's residence of Città di Castello. Judicial powers were transferred on 21 December 1827 to locally appointed magistrates, but the office of magistrate was suppressed on 5 July 1831 following uprisings.

In July 1849 Giuseppe Garibaldi and his wife Anita were received in Citerna. On the hill known as Colle delle Felcaie, Garibaldi remained for three days in 1849 after leaving Rome; a monument in the form of a spire was erected there by the inhabitants in 1883.

In September 1860 the territory was incorporated into the Kingdom of Italy.

In 1895 Citerna had 2,589 inhabitants.

== Geography ==
Citerna stands on an elevated hill at the confluence of the Cerfone and Sovara streams, which flow into the Tiber not far away. From the summit there is an extensive view over the Tiber valley, reaching as far as the mountains of La Verna and those of Gubbio and Assisi. At the top of the town are the remains of the ancient fortress.

To the north the hill descends steeply, opening into a natural amphitheatre. The town is enclosed by walls of irregular elliptical form and has two gates: Porta Romana to the east and Porta Fiorentina to the west.

The territory is crossed throughout its length by the winding river Sovara. The surrounding mountains shelter the interior of the municipality from severe atmospheric changes.

Città di Castello lies to the east at a distance of 6.7 kilometres (4.2 mi), Sansepolcro to the north at 7.7 kilometres (4.8 mi), San Giustino to the north-east at 6.7 kilometres (4.2 mi), and Anghiari to the north-west at 4.4 kilometres (2.7 mi). Monte Santa Maria lies to the south-east at 6.5 kilometres (4.0 mi), and Lippiano to the south-east at 4.4 kilometres (2.7 mi). Arezzo is 18 miles (29 km) away.

=== Subdivisions ===
The municipality includes the localities of Atena, Canciolo, Citerna, Fighille, Fontanelle, La Fornace, Mancino, Pistrino, Pistrino di Mezzo, Pistrino di Sopra, San Romano.

In 2021, 1,446 people lived in rural dispersed dwellings not assigned to any named locality. At the time, most of the population lived in Pistrino (1,609).

The following localities had no recorded permanent residents: Convento Zoccolanti, Petriolo, Quartiere, Sant'Antonio.

== Economy ==
In the mid-19th century the territory was described as very fertile, with highly developed agriculture. Agricultural produce exceeded local needs, and there was significant trade in livestock and cereals. The surrounding hills abounded in olives, fruit and grapes producing good wines.

The area also produced vegetables, notably large turnips grown after the grain and hemp harvests, which served both as food for the poor and as fodder for livestock.

The principal natural products were cereals, wine and tobacco. Livestock breeding prospered, as did the silk industry based on sericulture.

== Religion and culture ==
=== San Francesco ===
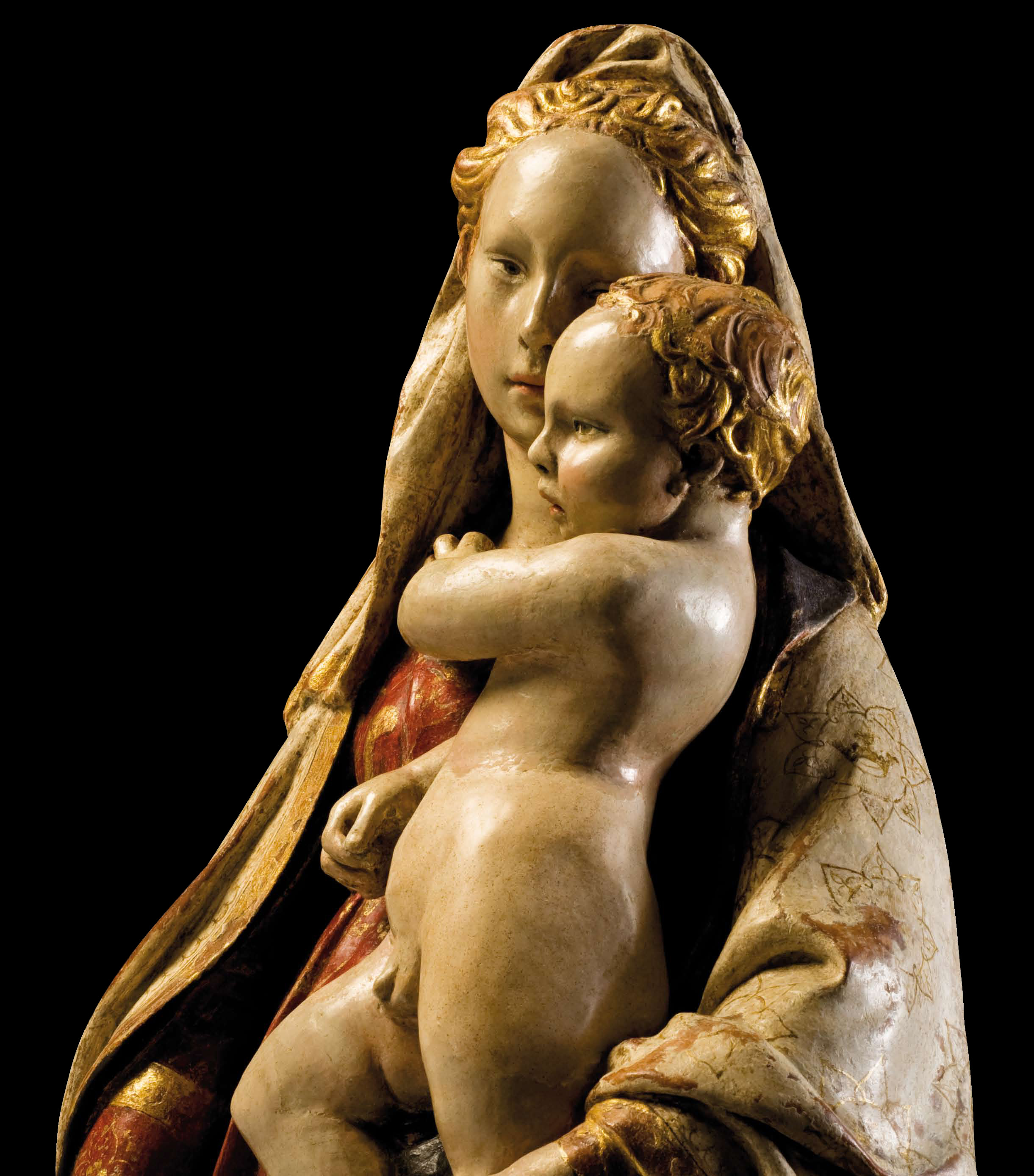
Madonna di Citerna by Donatello (c. 1415)

The Church of San Francesco was built in the second half of the 15th century. The church was constructed on the foundations of an earlier building visible in the lower part of the façade. It has a Renaissance façade and a Latin-cross plan. Along the nave are four altars of sandstone and wood, painted and gilded, with painted panels.

Above the first altar on the left is a 17th-century oil painting of the Annunciation by an unknown artist. The second altar holds a painting from the same century depicting a Franciscan supporting Saint John, the Immaculate Conception and the prophet Isaiah. On the right wall, the first altar contains a panel of the Madonna with Saints and the second a depiction of Saint Anthony of Padua showing a view of Citerna in the 16th century; both works are by Simeone Ciburri.

On the same wall is a niche with a fresco of the Virgin and Child with Saint Michael the Archangel and Saint Bernardino of Siena, attributed to the school of Luca Signorelli and possibly to Tommaso Barnabei. On the back wall of the left transept is a wooden altar dedicated to the Most Holy Crucifix, bearing a wooden crucifix in a Byzantine-influenced style. The altar also includes a panel of the Madonna and Saint John and two other paintings attributed to Raffaellino del Colle. In the same transept is an altar dedicated to Mary Magdalene with a painting of the Deposition by Niccolò Circignani, dated 1570. In the right transept are two further altars, one with a panel titled Christ in Glory by Raffaellino del Colle and another with a 16th-century painting of the Madonna enthroned.

The church also contains a polychrome terracotta Madonna and Child dated to around 1415 and attributed to the young Donatello, as well as a glazed terracotta work with fruit and cherubs and other paintings attributed to Raffaellino del Colle. The wooden choir dates to 1550.

=== Other religious buildings ===
The Church of San Michele Arcangelo, dedicated to the patron saint of the town, has a gabled façade with a central rose window and a Latin-cross plan with a single nave containing six chapels. The choir is square and covered by a barrel vault. Inside the church is a painted panel of the Crucifixion by Niccolò Circignani, dated 1570, and a terracotta sculpture of the Madonna and Child from the school of Giovanni della Robbia.

The Church of the Crocifisso has an entrance of notable architectural sculpture bearing the date 1532. In the presbytery is a fresco depicting the Virgin with Jesus, Saint Francis and Saint Bernardino, attributed to the school of Perugino. The cloister dates to the 13th century. Among the works formerly noted there were a Crucifixion attributed to Spinello Aretino and an oil painting of the Crucifixion at the high altar described as a fine composition by Pomarancio.

In the surrounding area stands the church of the Minori Osservanti, which contains a Crucifixion by Pomarancio at the high altar, dated 1570 and bearing the name of the commissioner, Ciatius Petri Meozii. Above the refectory door is a Head of an Angel in the manner of Piero della Francesca.

=== Other cultural heritage ===
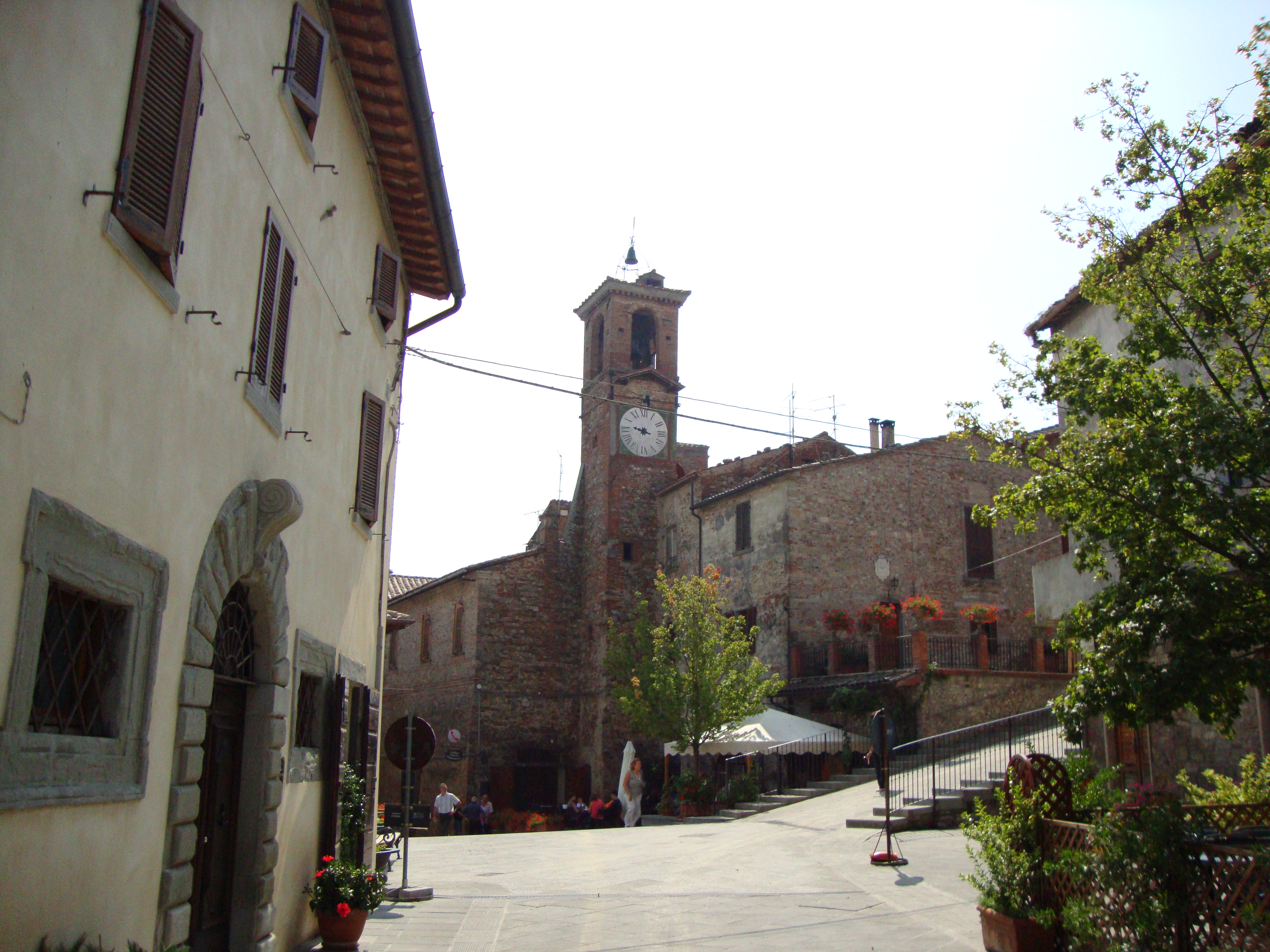
Piazza Scipione Scipioni

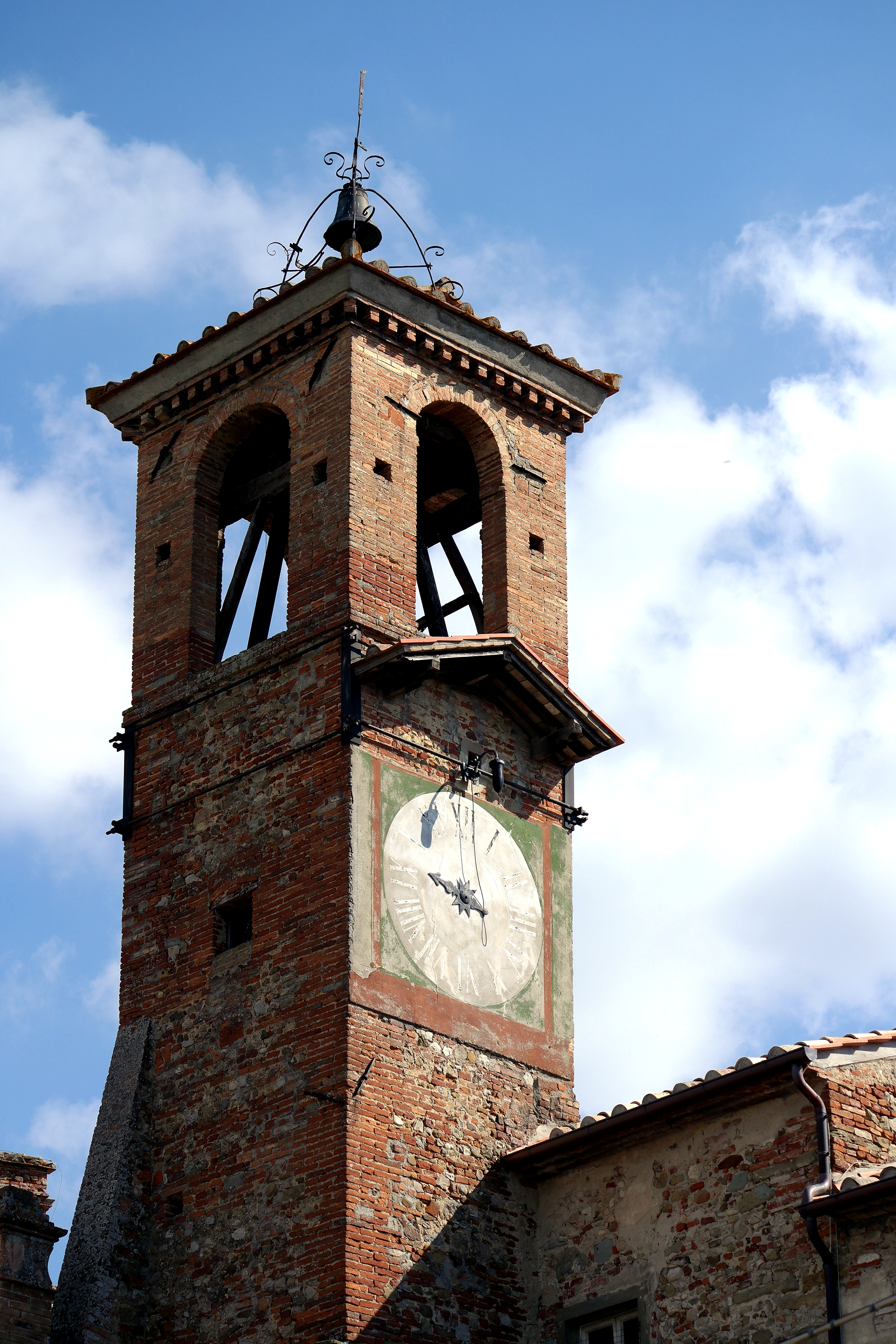
The clock tower in Citerna

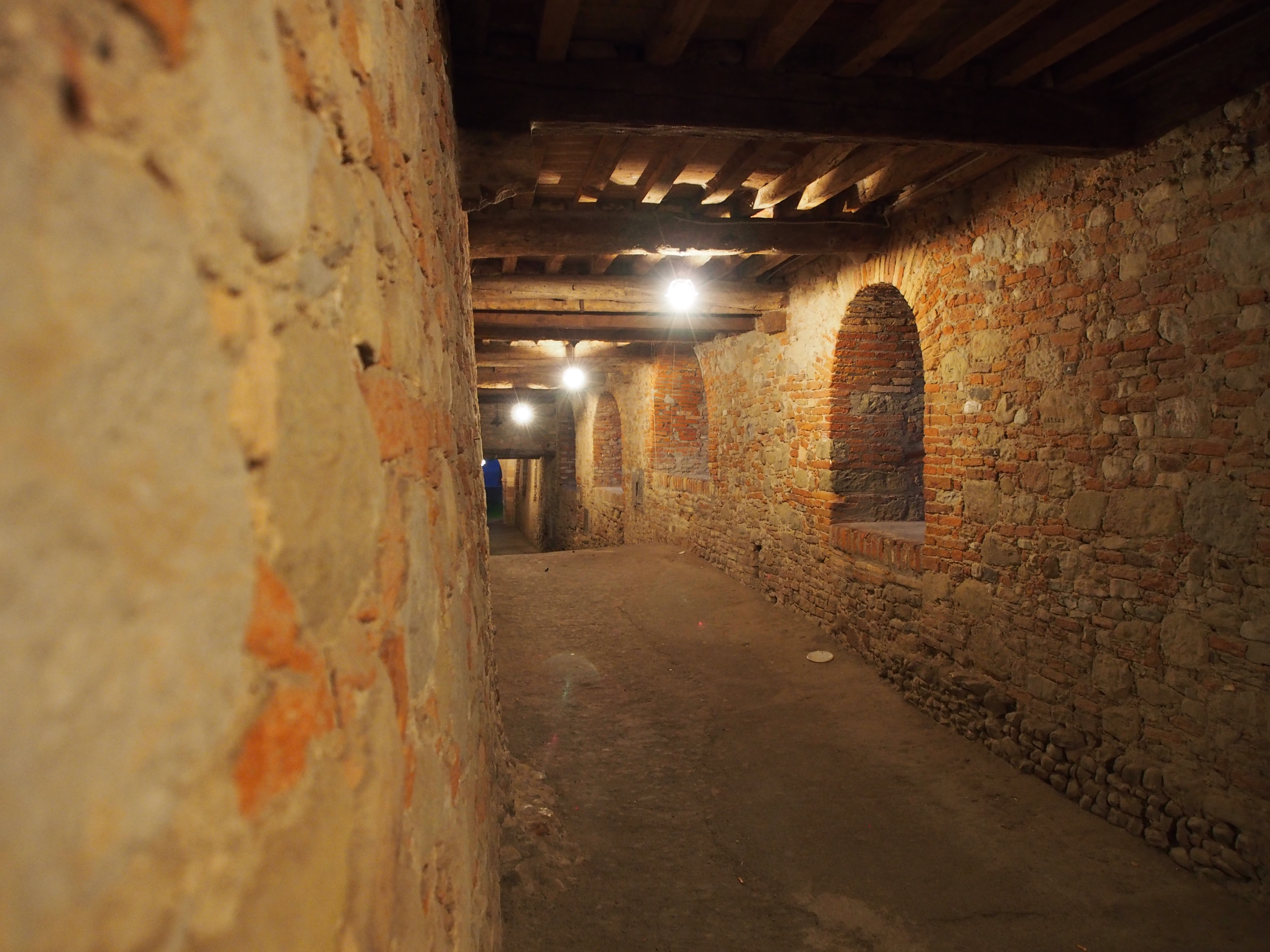
Covered walkway

The Torrione circolare is a circular tower that remains intact despite the destruction of much of the town's artistic heritage during the 1917 earthquake. It serves as a symbol of Citerna.

The Rocca stands in the oldest part of the settlement. It was partially destroyed in 1944.

Piazza Scipione Scipioni is the central square of Citerna. The Torre civica stands in the square and contains a clock with mechanical wooden gearing dating to the 16th century.

Near Palazzo Prosperi-Vitelli in the centre of Citerna, a small arch leads to a medieval walkway running along the perimeter of the town walls. The structure has large arched openings forming a series of loggias. Outside the walls near this walkway stands an ancient well known as Pozzo Vecchio, located above the Grande Cisterna.

Below the town, on a small hill, is the villa known as Il Giardino, property of the noble family Carleschi-Torriani-Tavanti.

== Notable people ==
Among the notable people of Citerna is a physician named Peverini, who is recorded to have introduced the smallpox vaccine in Italy at Citerna before the discovery of Jenner's vaccination.

Another notable person of Citerna is Orlando Orlandini, who distinguished himself during the siege of Kanizsa by personally seizing a banner from the Ottomans, for which Emperor Ferdinand II ennobled him.
