= Sohrab Mehmed Pasha =

Ottoman governor of Bosnia in 1667

Sohrab Mehmed Pasha (Turkish: Söhrab Mehmed Paşa, Serbo-Croatian: Sohrab Mehmed-paša; fl. 1665–67) was an Agha of the Janissaries, Ottoman official (pasha, and Vizier), the sanjak-bey of the Sanjak of Herzegovina in 1665, and beyler-bey of the Bosnia Eyalet in 1667 (appointed 22 May 1667), during the Cretan War (1645–69). He was of Bosnian origin.

== Sources ==
- Samardžić, Radovan; Veselinović, Rajko L.; Popović, Toma (1993). Radovan Samardžić (ed.). Istorija srpskog naroda. Treća knjiga, prvi tom: Srbi pod tuđinskom vlašću 1537-1699. Belgrade: Srpska književna zadruga.
