= Siege of Kanizsa (1664) =

- Part of Austro-Turkish War (1663–1664)
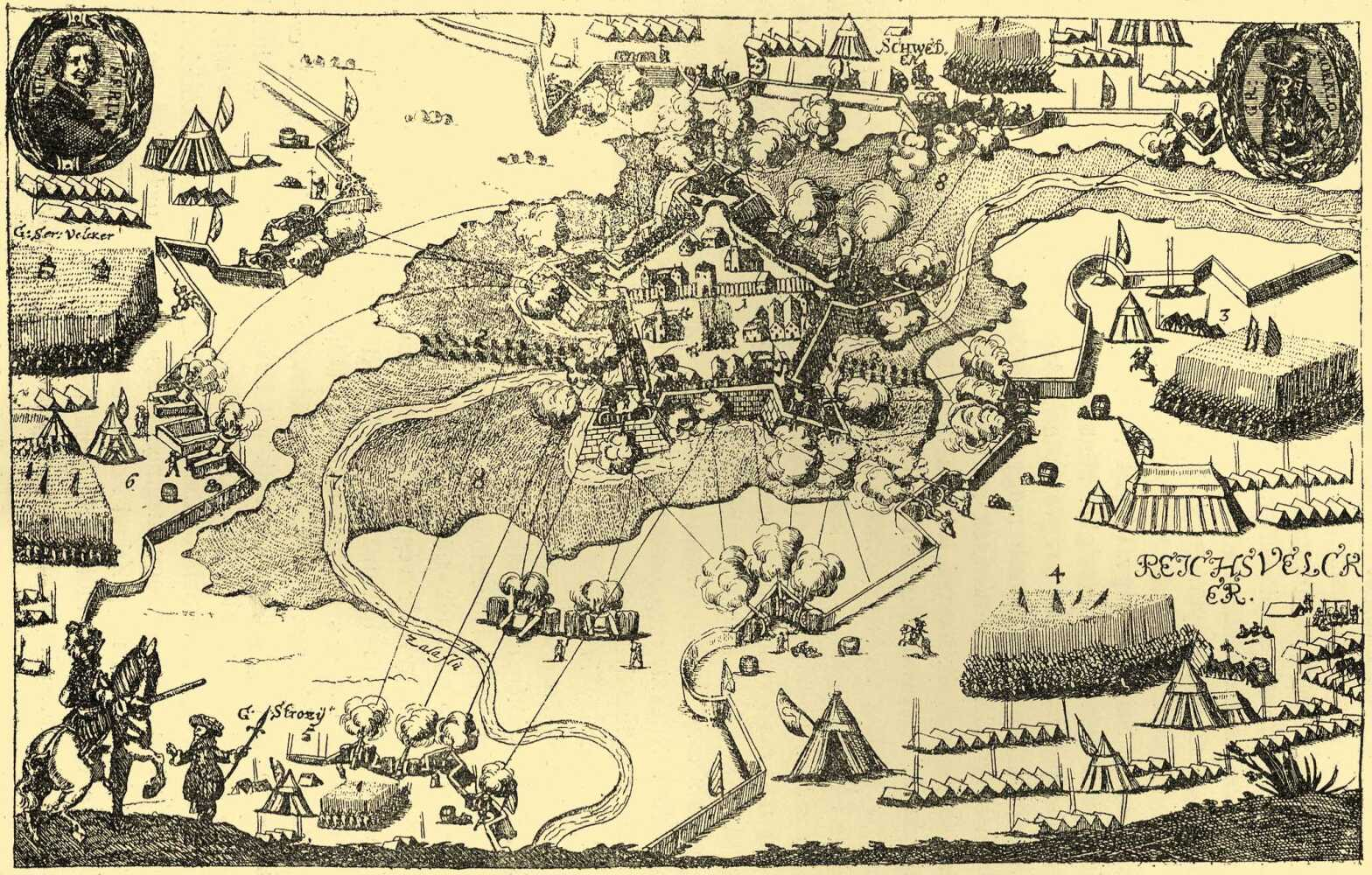
- The siege of Kanizsa on a copper engraving
Date	21 April – 30 May 1664
Location	Nagykanizsa, Kingdom of Hungary
Result	Ottoman victory

Belligerents
Ottoman Empire	Habsburg Monarchy; Kingdom of Hungary; Kingdom of Croatia; Electorate of Bavaria

Commanders and leaders
Sohrab Mehmed Pasha	Miklós Zrínyi; Wolfgang Julius; Pietro Strozzi

Strength
3,000–4,000	20,600; 7,400 Hungarians and Croatians; 7,000 Austrians; 5,000 Germans; 1,200 Bavarians

Casualties and losses
Unknown	Unknown

The siege of Kanizsa was an unsuccessful military operation carried out by Miklós Zrínyi to capture the Ottoman fortress of Kanizsa, the combined Hungarian-Austrian-German army on hearing of the incoming Turkish reinforcements had to withdraw after a month-long siege.

== Background ==
The castle, which was captured by the Turks in 1600, became the center of the newly organized Ottoman Vilayet. It was the starting point for regular raids on Zrínyi's estates in the Muraköz region. When the war between the Holy Roman Empire and the Ottoman Empire broke out because of Transylvania in 1661, Zrínyi acted quickly and built a fortress, Zrínyi-Újvár, near Kanizsa.

Finally, in 1663, the Turkish armies did move to Hungary, but not along the Drava, but against Érsekújvár that was in the north of Royal Hungary. The important fortress soon fell, and several border castles in Lower Hungary suffered this fate. After the army of Grand Vizier Köprülü Fazil Ahmed Pasha marched into winter accommodation, Zrínyi prepared a preventive strike, which became the famous Winter campaign of 1664.

== Siege ==
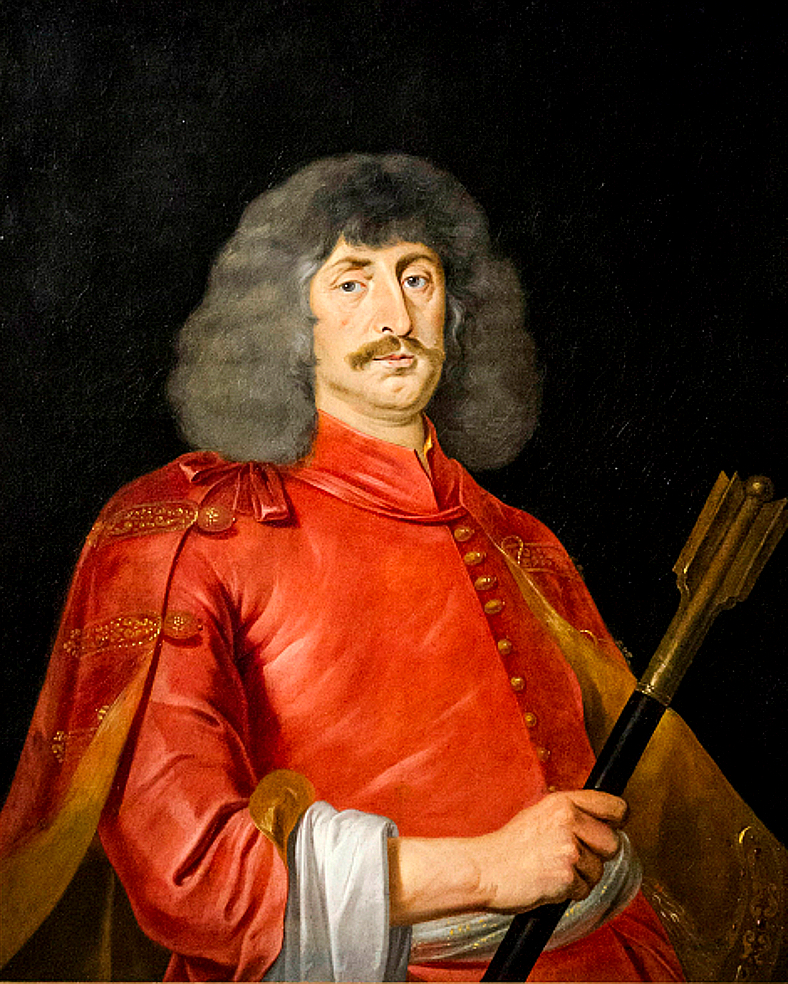
Miklós Zrínyi, ban of Croatia

Zrinyi planned to begin the siege of Kanizsa in early March, but due to the slow preparation of troops, the siege had to be postponed until April. Zrínyi assembled some 20,000 troops and, still in March, set out at the head of 300 hussars to spy on Kanizsa. The Turks learned of this plan and sent a detachment against Zrinyi, however, the detachment was defeated. Zrinyi reported to Emperor Leopold I on the situation in Kanitzsa and the siege was scheduled for April 8, but due to the German troops' procrastination, it did not begin until the end of the month.

The Hungarian-Habsburg Army camped near Zrínyi-Újvár and set out for Kanitza on April 28, occupying the Kanitza suburb called Rácváros on the same day. The siege was not initially successful due to a lack of gunpowder and cannons, so it was decided to dig trenches all day and night.

On April 30, the cannons began bombing the castle, however, they could not make a breach in the walls suitable for an attack despite the one-month artillery fire. On May 4, more cannons arrived from Graz, but they were so heavy that the embankments fell beneath them. After several days of work, military engineer Wassenhoff managed to restore the embankments, during which time the bombardment of the castle was paused. It was raining as well, and the defenders sallied out of the castle, they killed 50 soldiers and destroyed the embankment roads.

Yet the siege should have been hurried, for the Ottoman army of Grand Vizier Köprülü Fazil Ahmed Pasha was approaching. On hearing this, Zrínyi tried to hurry up the taking of the castle, sending his envoy to Vienna for help. On May 19, the defenders carried out a strong sally, Zrínyi almost perished when an enemy projectile hit the ground a few steps away from him. The Bán even lost consciousness for a few moments.

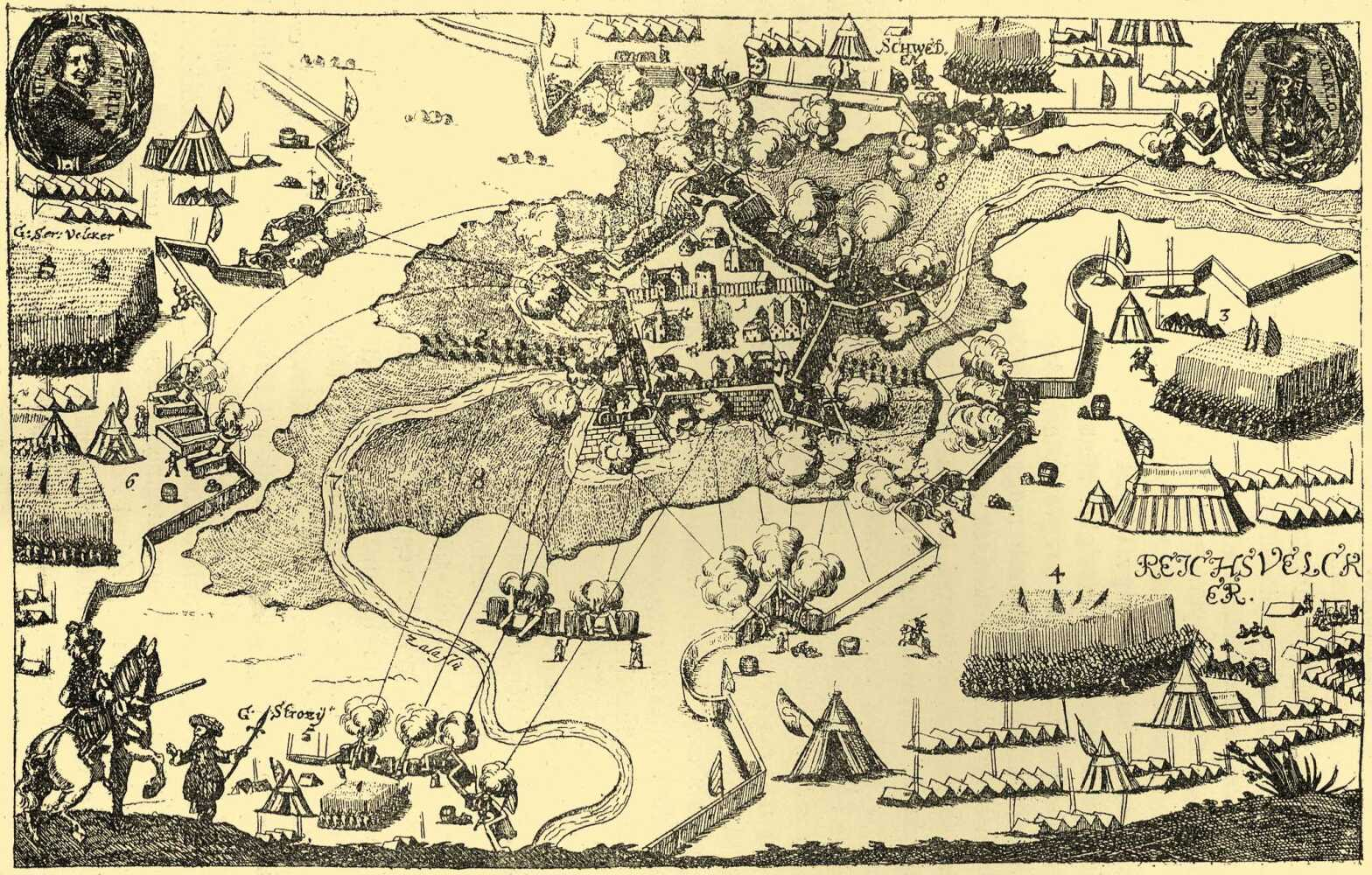
Siege of Kanizsa

At last, the Bavarians arrived on 23 May. Zrínyi sent an assistant officer called Renaut to Wolfgang Julius von Hohenlohe with the news under the cover of night, but a team of defenders breaking out of the castle captured the envoy. On May 26, Strozzi sent a 3,000-strong reconnaissance detachment to monitor the movement of the Ottoman rescue army. The next evening, it was reported that enemy columns, about 60,000 soldiers were approaching Kanizsa.

On the morning of May 31, the Christian leaders held a war council to decide on what to do. Zrínyi was reasoning to carry on with the fight and confront the oncoming enemy, but the imperial leaders feared they could fall between two fires if the defenders also sallied out of the castle. Therefore, they decided to withdraw. On the early morning of June 2, the army hurriedly left the area around the castle and retreated toward Zrínyi-Újvár.

== Aftermath ==
Due to the unsuccessful siege of Kanizsa, Zrinyi was removed from his position as commander-in-chief. Styria, whose troops were ordered to Magyaróvár, was in danger. In the crisis, forces had to be regrouped from the north, mainly because of the Grand Vizier's growing army. The armies remaining in the south had to hold out until then, and Zrínyi-újvár had to survive to the end. Köprülü targeted the castle. There were troops stationed in Međimurje but these alone would not have been enough to defend or relieve the castle. Not even when Montecuccoli arrived. The army was starving, weak, and its ranks were quite disordered. Montecuccoli was unable to control the situation, so he could not launch an attack.

Zrínyi-újvár fell and Zrínyi left the front for Vienna. Montecuccoli retreated as far as Vas County and decided to engage in a decisive battle there with the Grand Vizier's troops, which were outnumbered by several five times. At the battle of Saint-Gotthard he defeated Köprülü in an open battle, but the court concluded the peace of Vasvár on 1 August 1664.

== See also ==
- Miklós Zrínyi
- Sohrab Mehmed Pasha
- Wolfgang Julius
- Austro-Turkish War (1663-1664)
