= Palio =

Italian historical athletic contest

Palio is the name given in Italy to an annual athletic contest, very often of a historical character, pitting the neighbourhoods of a town or the hamlets of a comune against each other. Typically, they are fought in costume and commemorate some event or tradition of the Middle Ages and thus often involve horse racing, archery, jousting, crossbow shooting, and similar medieval sports. Once purely a matter of local rivalries, many have now become events that are staged with an eye to visitors and foreign tourists.

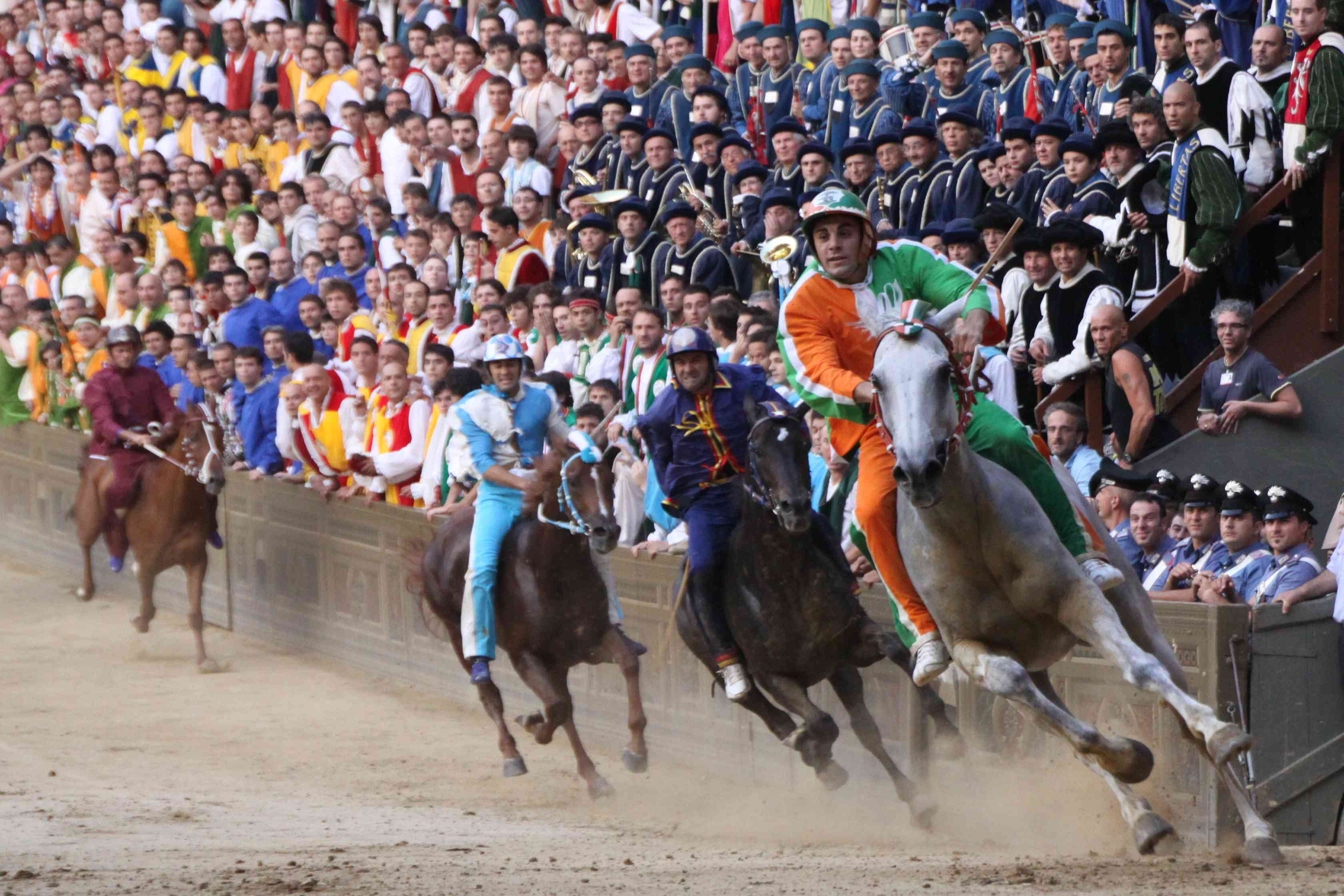
The Palio di Siena in July 2010

The Palio di Siena is the only one that has been run without interruption since it started in the 1630s and is definitely the most famous all over the world. Its historical origins are documented since 1239 even though the version seen today was the final evolution of races held from the second half of the 16th century. In 1935, Italian Prime Minister Benito Mussolini sent out an official declaration that only the one of Siena could bring the designation of Palio. All other horse races held in various parts of Italy are actually just modern reenactments. After the Second World War, nevertheless, many other palios arose throughout the various regions of Italy. Here is an incomplete list:

== Italian Palios ==
=== Palios with horse races ===
==== Tuscany ====
- Palio of Bientina, third Sunday of July
- Palio of Buti in honor of St. Anthony the Abbot,
- Palio di Castel del Piano of Castel del Piano, racing on 8 September
- Palio delle Contrade, in Faella
- Palio dei Rioni di Castiglion Fiorentino the third Sunday of June
- Palio of Casole d'Elsa, Second Sunday of July
- Palio of Piancastagnaio
- Palio di Fucecchio, at the end of May
- Palio in Montelaterone
- Palio in Monticiano
- Palio di Siena, race is held on 2 July and 16 August
- Palio della Costa Etrusca in San Vincenzo (suspended)
- Palio del Valdarno, a Faella, in Pian di Scò
- Palio in Pian di Scò, on 7 August
- Palio delle Bandiere e dei Territori in Follonica
- Palio di San Luca in Impruneta in October

==== Lazio ====
- Corsa a vuoto of Ronciglione, a Carnival feast. In August
- Palio del Tirreno of Maccarese-Fiumicino, not held in 2008.
- Palio Madama Margarita di Castel Madama, every second Sunday in July
- Palio dell'Arcata in Acquapendente
- Palio in Bomarzo
- Palio del Tributo in Priverno
- Palio of Tolfa last Sunday in August
- Palio of Sacrofano, Second Sunday in September
- Corsa of Formello, on 10 August
- Palio di San Matteo, on 22 September
- Corsa al Fantino in Capranica
- Corsa in Campagnano di Roma
- Palio of Selci in September
- Corsa of Monterosi, on 15 September
- Carosello Storico dei Rioni of Cori, in June and July
- Pallio della Carriera in Carpineto Romano (RM).
- Palio delle Quattro Porte – Vallecorsa

==== Lombardy ====
- Palio della Valle Olona
- Palio di Legnano, Last Sunday in May
- Palio di S.Pietro at Abbiategrasso
- Palio degli Asini in Premosello
- Palio of Rho, Second Sunday in October
- Palio di Avucat at Caponago, second Sunday in September

==== Piedmont ====
- Palio di Asti, every third Sunday in September
- Palio dei Borghi of Fossano, at the end of June
- Palio storico dei Borghi di Avigliana, at Avigliana, Third Sunday in June
- Palio di Druento, at Druento

==== Sardinia ====
- Palio of Cagliari
- Palio dei Comuni of Fonni, First Sunday in June
- Palio dei Comuni of Goceano
- Palio "Sas Carrelas", at Bono
- Palio of Sassari

==== Umbria ====
- Palio (Giostra) del Giglio at Monteleone d'Orvieto, 16 August
- Palio di Nera Montoro in September

==== Veneto ====
- Palio di Feltre First Sunday in August. Horse race and Archery contest
- Palio dei 10 Comuni del Montagnanese, at Montagnana, first Sunday in September
- Palio delle contrade di Monselice Second and Third Sunday in September.

==== Marche ====
- Palio dell'Assunta di Fermo, on 15 August
- Palio of Montegiorgio
- Palio of Sant'Emidio also called Quintana in Ascoli Piceno
- Corsa del Drappo in Loreto, on 7 September
- Contesa della Margutta a Corridonia, early September
- Palio della miniera di zolfo di Cabernardi, early August
- Palio dei Castelli in San Severino Marche, early June

==== Emilia-Romagna ====
- Palio di Ferrara, Last Sunday in May
- Palio del Maggio, at Savigno in May
- Palio delle contrade in San Secondo Parmense
- Palio di Parma,
- Palio del Niballo, at Faenza
- Palio di Giovecca, at Giovecca
- Palio of Mordano

==== Sicily ====
- Palio of Butera
- Palio of Piazza Armerina, 11 to 13 August
- Palio dell'Ascensione in Floridia
- Palio di San Vincenzo, in Acate

==== Basilicata ====
- Palio di Sant'Antonio abate in Pignola, on 17 January, a race with Horses, donkeys and mules

==== Abruzzo ====
- Palio della Giostra Cavalleresca in Sulmona Last Saturday and Sunday of July
- Palio della Giostra Cavalleresca dei Borghi più Belli d'Italia – in Sulmona
- Palio della Giostra Cavalleresca d'Europa – Sulmona

==== Puglia ====
- Palio del Viccio of Palo del Colle – held at carnival.

=== Palios with donkey races ===
==== Umbria ====
- Giochi de le Porte of Gualdo Tadino

==== Lombardy ====
- Corsa cogli Asini of Dairago
- Palio degli Asini in Bereguardo
- Palio del Cinghiale, in Cesano Boscone

==== Piedmont ====
- Palio degli Asini di Alba in Alba
- Palio degli Asini di Cocconato in Cocconato
- Palio degli Asini di Quarto d'Asti in Quarto d'Asti
- Paglio ragliante di Calliano in Calliano
- Palio dei Borghi in Venaria

==== Toscana ====
- Palio dei Ciuchi of Campagnatico, in September
- Palio dei Micci of Pozzi, frazione di Seravezza
- Palio dei Ciuchi of Carmignano, in September
- Palio dei somari of Bagnolo
- Palio dei somari of Torrita di Siena
- Palio dei Somari of Montepulciano Stazione
- Giostra dei sestrieri, Palio dei Ciuchi of Roccatederighi
- Palio de' Ciui of Lugnano
- Palio dei somarelli of Vallerona

==== Campania ====
- "Il Palio di Somma Vesuviana", second Sunday in September
- "Palio del casale", Palio Nazionale degli asini, Camposano
- "Palio del ciuccio", Cuccaro Vetere.

==== Lazio ====
- Palio delle Contrade, in Gonfalone di Arpino.
- Palio delle Contrade of Corchiano, First Sunday in August
- Palio delle Contrade of Allumiere
- Palio di San Ciro at Sora

==== Marche ====
- Palio del Somaro in Mercatello sul Metauro

==== Emilia-Romagna ====
- Palio di Ferrara
- Palio di Parma,
- Palio dei somari of Grizzana Morandi

==== Friuli ====
- Palio dei Borghi di Fagagna, second Sunday in September

=== Palios with boat races (Palii remieri) ===
==== Tuscany ====
- Palio dell'Argentario, in Porto Santo Stefano, 15 August
- Palio di Calcinaia of Calcinaia
- Palio di San Ranieri, in Arno and Pisa on 17 June
- Palio Madonna del Lago of Massaciuccoli, since 1967

==== Liguria ====
- Palio Marinaro di San Pietro, at Genoa, first Sunday of July
- Palio del Golfo, at La Spezia, first Sunday of August
- Palio dei Sestieri, in Ventimiglia, second Sunday in August
- Regata dei Rioni di Noli, in Noli, Second Sunday in September

==== Apulia ====
- Palio of Taranto

==== Trentino ====
- Palio dell'Oca, in Trento

==== Veneto ====
- Regata Storica, in Venice

==== Calabria ====
- Palio di San Giorgio, in Reggio Calabria, on 23 April

==== Lazio ====
- Palio del mare of Gaeta

=== Palios with weapons ===
==== Tuscany ====
- Palio della balestra in Lucca, on July 12, a crossbow contest
- Palio in Pescia, an archery contest
- Disfida con l'Arco in Montopoli in Val d'Arno (Pi), an archery contest
- Palio del Diotto in Scarperia, on 8 September (one of the games is a knife-throwing)

==== Umbria ====
- Palio di San Rufino in Assisi, a crossbow competition
- Palio dei Terzieri, in August, an archery contest

==== Lazio ====
- Palio of Orte, an archery contest

==== Friuli ====
- Palio di San Donato, in Cividale del Friuli, last Sunday in August, an archery contest
- Palio of Cordovado, first Sunday of September, an archery contest with a medieval costume parade

==== Emilia-Romagna ====
- Palio di Santa Reparata e della Romagna Toscana, in Terra del Sole, a crossbow contest

==== Veneto ====
- Palio della Marciliana, in Chioggia, a crossbow contest.

=== Others ===
==== Tuscany ====
- Bravio delle botti of Montepulciano, a wine barrell race
