= Palio del Niballo =

Historical re-enactment in Faenza, Italy

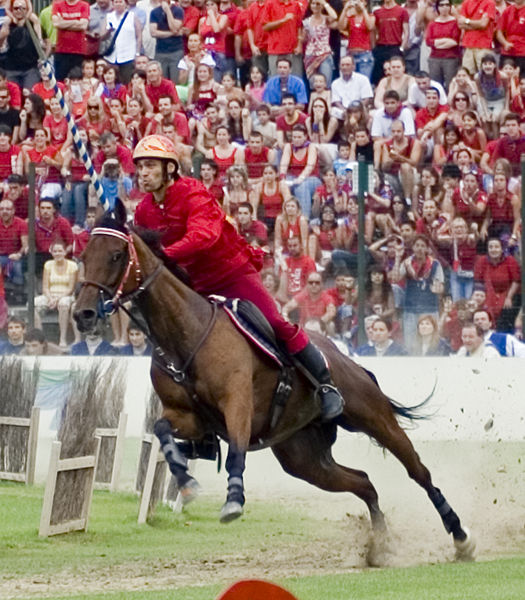
- Knight of the Rione Rosso (Red District) in a round of competition
- Status: active
- Genre: Quintain
- Dates: Fourth Sunday of June (Palio); Second Saturday of June (Bigorda d'Oro); Third weekend of June (Flag-wavers competition); 5 January (Nott de Bisò)
- Frequency: annual
- Location: Faenza
- Country: Italy
- Years active: before 1410-1796; since 1959
- Website: paliodifaenza.it/en

The Palio del Niballo is the characteristic historical reenactment competition of the city of Faenza in Italy. It is a recreation of the jousts of medieval origin and is held between five historic districts of the city; it usually takes place on the fourth Sunday of June.

Around the main tournament, other events have developed over time, shaping the cultural life of the city in Romagna throughout June —locally known as the Month of the Palio— and on various occasions throughout the year.

== History ==
The modern Palio has its historical roots in the Middle Ages in Faenza: the first joust of which there is evidence is in fact the Giostra del Barbarossa, a quintain wanted in January 1164 by the emperor Frederick Barbarossa to test the ability of the Faenza citizens in battle. The event remains impressed in popular memory for a long time and then over the centuries four other jousts ran in Faenza: the Palio di San Nevolone, the Palio dell'Assunta, the Palio di San Pietro and the Quintana del Niballo.

The oldest archive documentation relating to the latter dates back to 1410, which however presents the Palio as a more remote custom:

Hebbe per antichissima consuetudine questo nobile pubblico di proporre ogni anno un premio per invitar la gioventù ad esser assai presta nelli attrezzi cavagliereschi [...]. Al qual effetto si faceva piantar sulla piazza il saracino ovvero ANIBALLO et correre longa un carrera di cavalli.

---

This noble community had, by most ancient custom, the practice of proposing each year a prize, to invite the youth to be swift and skilled in knightly exercises [...]. To this end, there was set up in the square the Saracen, or Aniballo, and a long course of horsemen was run.

This joust, which today's Palio del Niballo is linked to, took place until 1796, when the upheavals linked to the French Revolution also reached Faenza.

In modern times, the first edition of the Quintain dates back to 1959: the idea of recovering the Palio is due to Ermanno Cola and Giuseppe Sangiorgi, who drew inspiration from the ancient chronicles of the chivalric tournament dating back to the Renaissance.

== Districts (Rioni) ==
The modern Palio has as its protagonists the five districts (Rioni) of the city, which compete for victory:

Map of the Districts in the historic center of Faenza

- Rione Giallo (Yellow District): represents the area around Porta Ponte. Its color is yellow, and its shield shows a two-tiered tower with three red bands, symbolizing strength and heritage.
- Rione Rosso (Red District): associated with Porta Imolese. Its color is red, and its emblem depicts a right arm wielding a sword, a sign of courage and determination.
- Rione Nero (Black District): linked to Porta Ravegnana. Its shield features a pine tree with a golden coin at its trunk, recalling ancient prosperity and endurance.
- Rione Verde (Green District): corresponds to Porta Montanara. Its symbol shows three golden stars above a silver three-peaked mountain, representing aspiration and the city’s link to the Apennines.
- Borgo Durbecco (Durbecco Borough): formerly known as the White District, associated with Porta delle Chiavi. Its symbol is the ancient towered bridge that once connected the borough to the city.

The first four districts: Giallo, Rosso, Nero and Verde, take up the colours and the ancient administrative division of the municipality, still visible in old city maps preserved in the municipal library.

The district territories are separated by the four city streets, the ancient cardo and decumanus of the Roman era, and reproduce the early medieval historical division of the city of Faenza into four districts. Borgo Durbecco, that is, the area of the city on the right bank of the Lamone river, developed in the late medieval era, was established as "Rione Bianco" in 1959 in order to involve this area of the city in the race, otherwise excluded from the event. On the same occasion, it was decided to assign the Borgo district the color white and as a symbol the representation of the ancient bridge over the Lamone river that connected the city with the Borgo.

== The Race ==
Udite, Madonne e Cavalieri de' turriti castelli della Val d'Amone, delle piane ubertose di Romagna, genti terriere et genti forastiere.

Accorrete alla tenzone ch'ogn'anno si corre nella quarta domenica di giugno. Dalla Porta del Ponte et Montanara, dalla Porta Imolese et Ravegnana e da Durbecco, dame e cavalieri, armigeri e balestri muoveranno, alte portando le insegne dei Rioni, per disputar sul campo della giostra l'ambìto Palio, ch'a vincitor compete. E voi, Madonne, festeggiate i cavalieri ch'a all'incontro giostreran da prodi non meno di colui che lauro conquisterà nella contesa. Alti volteggieran nel vento, d'abilissimi alfieri, gli stendardi et scalpitar di destrieri e balenar d'acciari, rinverdiranno i fasti della città manfreda.

---

Hear ye, Ladies and Knights of the turreted castles of the Val d’Amone, of the fertile plains of Romagna, both townsfolk and travelers alike.

Gather for the contest that takes place each year on the fourth Sunday of June. From Porta Ponte and Montanara, from Porta Imolese and Ravegnana, and from Durbecco, ladies and knights, men-at-arms and crossbowmen shall march, bearing high the banners of their Districts, to contend in the jousting field for the coveted Palio, the prize due to the victor. And you, fair Ladies, celebrate the knights who shall ride bravely to the encounter, no less valiant than he who shall win the laurel in the fray. High in the wind shall whirl the banners of skillful standard-bearers, while the stamping of steeds and the flash of steel shall bring once more to life the glories of the Manfredi’s city.

— The Town Crier calls the Districts "in singular combat"

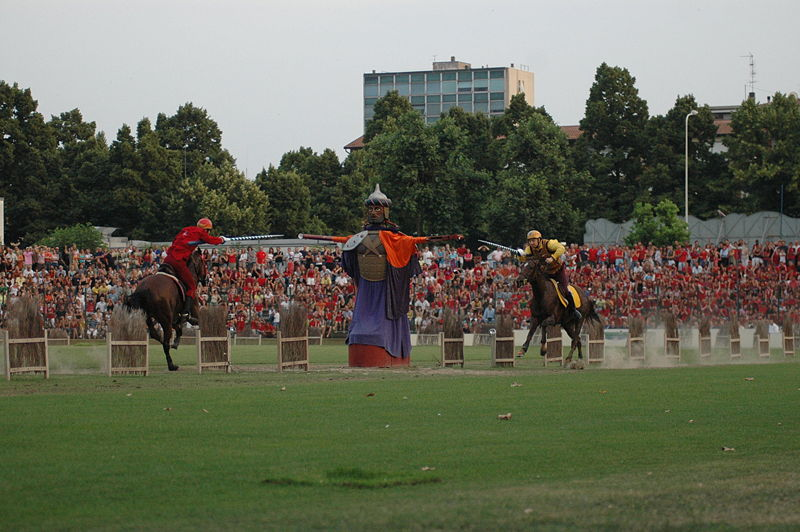
Knights challenging each other in a round of competition

The Palio competition takes place at the "Bruno Neri" municipal stadium in Faenza. The five knights of the respective district challenge each other in pairs: the representative of the Rione that came in last in the previous year's Palio challenges the four knights of the opposing districts one by one, then an identical challenge is launched by all the other contenders, for a total of twenty clashes (called rounds).

The knights use lances ('bigorde') with a length of 2.75 meters and a weight of 3,750 kilograms. At the start of the round, the riders take up their places in the starting stalls, placed side by side. When the magistrate gives the go-ahead, the stalls open and the knights send their horses galloping, each one following its own semi-circular track for a length of about 145 metres.

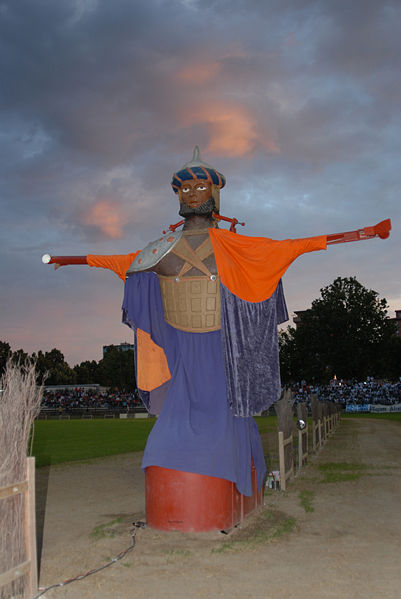
The Niballo

The meeting between the knights takes place on the other side of the competition field, where the two tracks become parallel and where the "Niballo" (name deriving from the Carthaginian leader Hannibal) is placed, a mechanical puppet depicting a Saracen with his arms outstretched and with a target with a diameter of 8 centimetres in each hand.

The first knight who hits the target with his lance without having committed any irregularities during the approach, causes the arm that was struck to be raised and wins the round. Each victory entitles the defeated Rione to a shield, which is raised on the tribune of the winning district.

At the end of the twenty rounds of challenge, the district that has won the most scudi wins the Palio, that is, a cloth banner; the district that came in second wins a porchetta; the third a rooster and a braid of garlic. In the event of a tie in the number of shields won, play-off rounds are played to determine the victory. In the event of a tie, the positions of the previous year are looked at for the rest of the ranking.

== Related events ==
The Palio represents the culmination of a rich calendar of events that especially characterize the month of June, traditionally known as the Month of the Palio. During these weeks, the city comes alive with a festive and participatory atmosphere, where historical tradition and community spirit intertwine. The districts (Rioni), protagonists of the competition, become hubs of social life and community gathering: they organize meetings, convivial evenings, and propitiatory dinners that involve not only supporters but the entire citizenry.

These moments serve not only a recreational purpose but also provide tangible support for district activities, strengthen the sense of belonging, and express the passionate support that accompanies the joust. The anticipation of the tournament thus becomes a collective journey of preparation, in which the whole city actively contributes to building the event.

Among the collateral events, the most notable include:

=== Historical parade ===
The parade that precedes the Palio race is particularly folkloristic. At 4:00 pm on the day of the Palio, at the first stroke of the clock tower in the city center, the procession of the Municipal Group positions itself at the foot of the steps of the Cathedral, from which the Palio emerges, which will remain in the hands of the Municipal Group until the awards ceremony. Then the five districts enter the town square following the order of arrival at the Palio of the previous year. At the entrance of each district, from the arcades of the Manfedi palace the flag-wavers wave their flags as a sign of greeting to their procession. Once all the districts have entered, the Municipal Group enters, and following the reading of the "Bando" (announcement), in which the town crier or herald calls the districts "a singolar tenzone" (to singular competition), the actual procession begins, from Piazza del Popolo to the "Bruno Neri" stadium where the race is held. The Municipal Group is in the lead and then all the districts follow, whose parade order is established by the previous year's ranking. The costumes recall the clothes and traditions of the period from 1410 to 1501 (the period of greatest splendor of the Manfredi family, lords of Faenza): knights, soldiers, ladies, magistrates, clarion players, drummers and flag-wavers parade to the rhythm of each district's march.

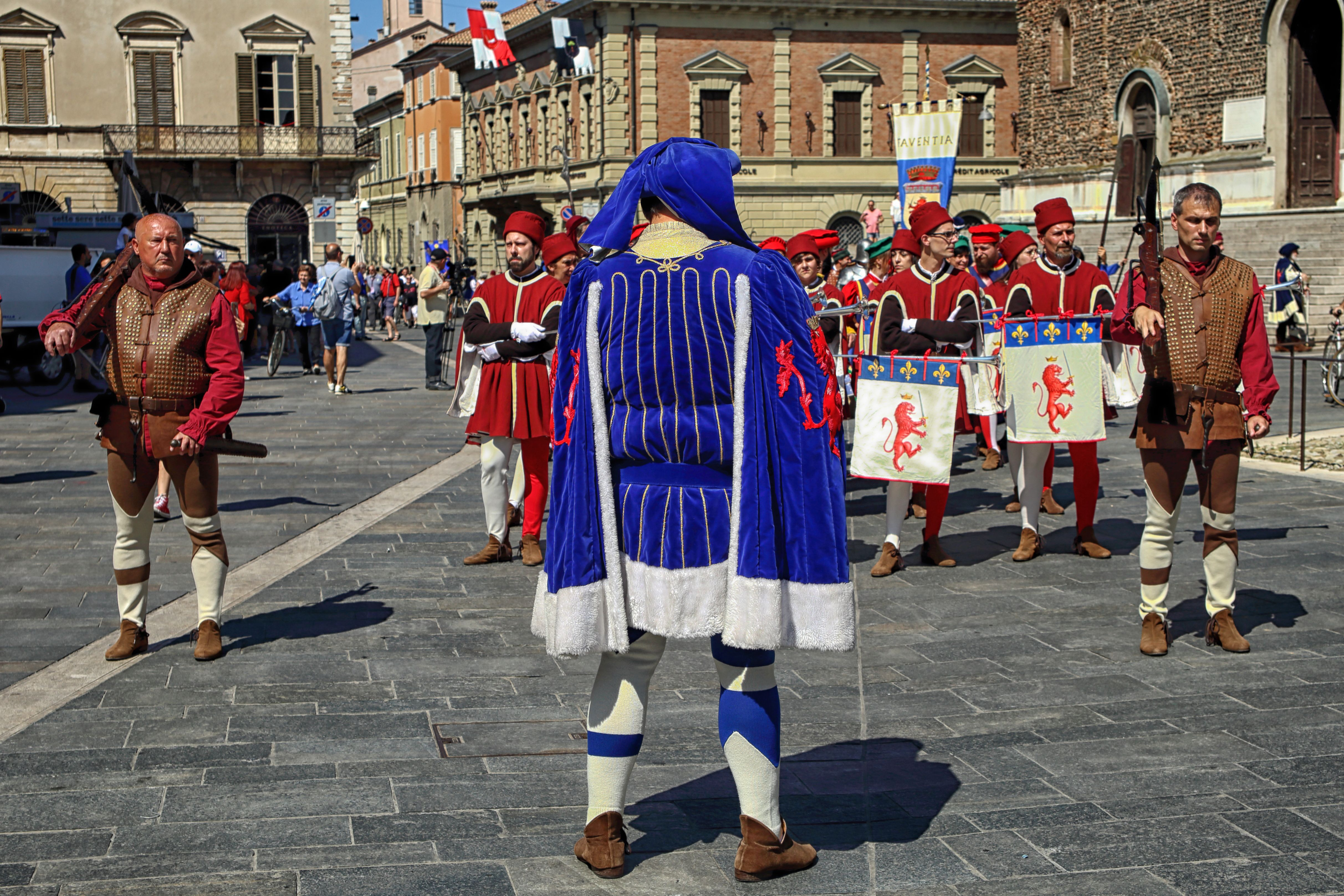
Municipal group at the head of the parade in the square

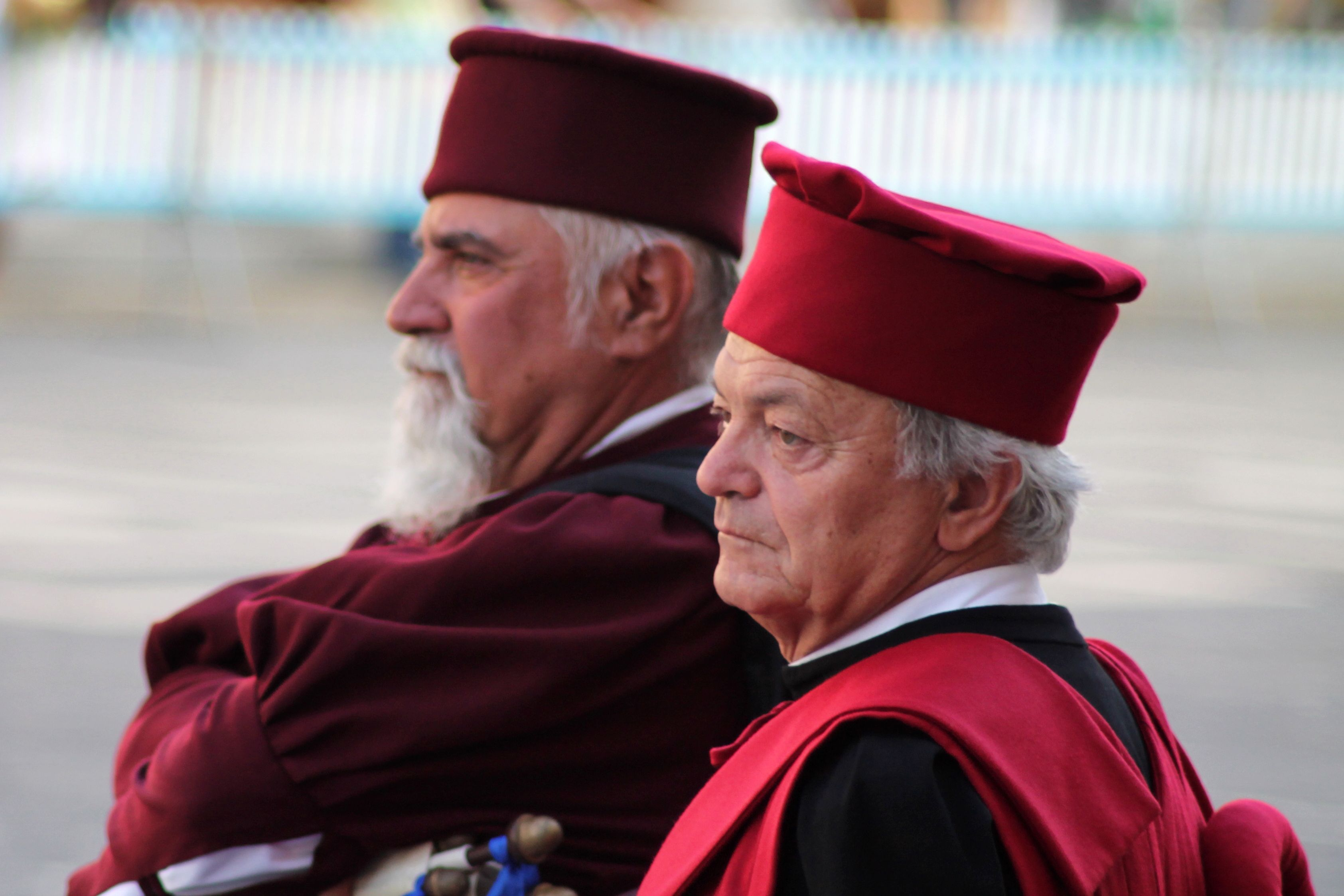
The Podestà della Giostra (Mayor of the Joust) and the Maestro di Campo (Field Master)

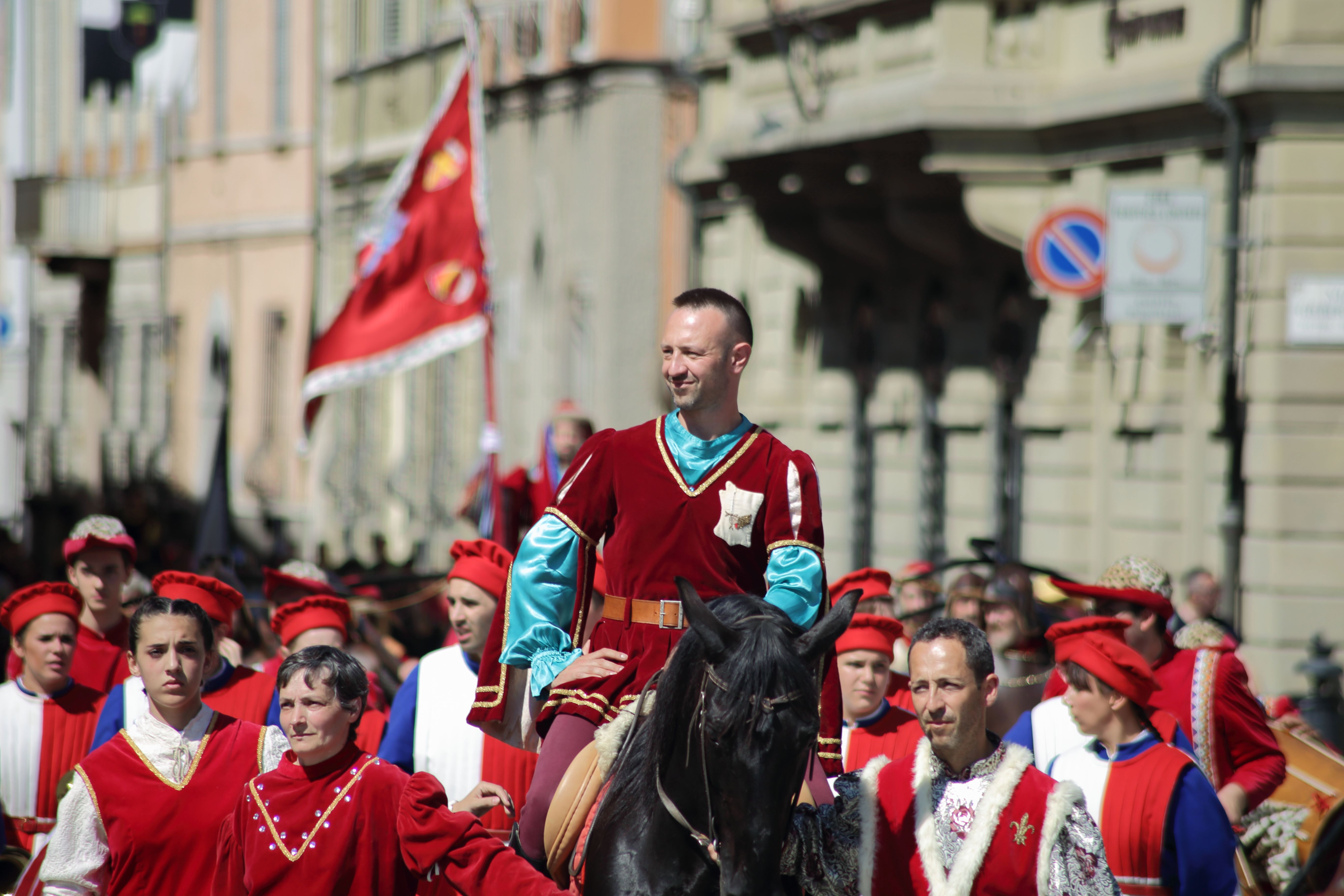
The parade

=== Award ceremony ===
Starting from the 2006 edition, the award ceremony for the winner of the Palio no longer takes place on the competition field. At the end of the tournament, the procession forms again and heads back towards the city centre and reaches Piazza della Libertà. The award ceremony takes place on the steps of the cathedral, in the presence of the mayor, the bishop and a crowd of enthusiasts.

=== Bigorda d'Oro ===
Also called the "Palio dei giovani" (Palio for young riders), as it has similar characteristics to the main Palio, including the procession, except for the young age of the knights, it takes place on the Saturday preceding the second Sunday in June.

=== Flag-wavers competition ===
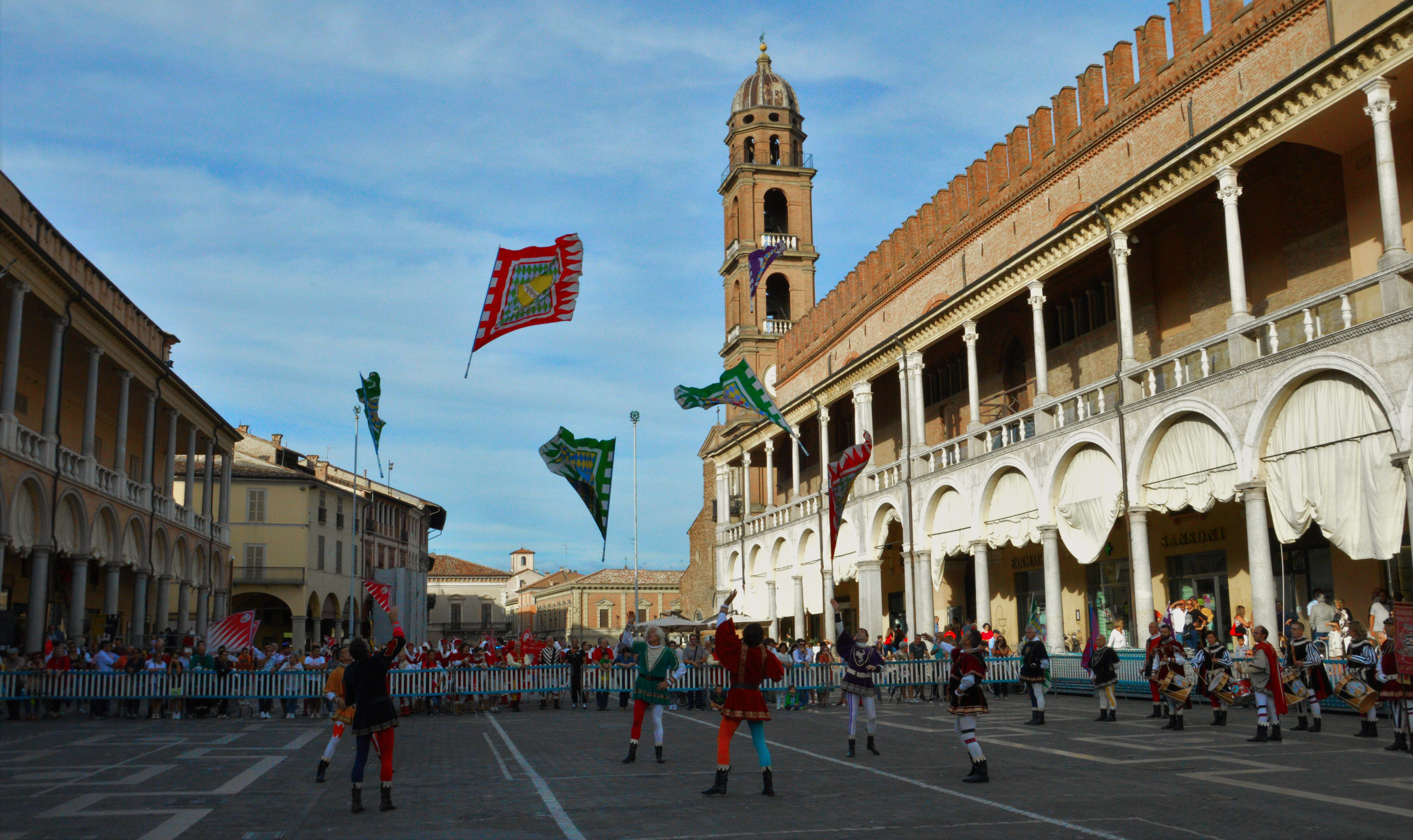
Flag wavers in Piazza del Popolo

On the third weekend of June, the various competitions of the Flag wavers competition (commonly called "Sbandieratori") between the five city districts are held in Piazza del Popolo (the main square). On the evening of the third Saturday of June, the districts compete for victory in the specialties of the Single, the Small Team and the Large Team as well as in the Musicians' Competition.

The figures and exercises that the standard-bearers are able to perform, accompanied by the roll of the drum and the blasts of the clarions, are exciting for their elegance, perfection and rhythm and the whole thing is inserted in a show made even more suggestive by the surrounding of the other armed figures and the setting of the town square. To wave the flag and play at high levels requires a lot of training, so much so that the efforts made by the members of almost all the districts start again at a forced pace just a few months after the end of the Palio.

=== Nott de Bisò ===
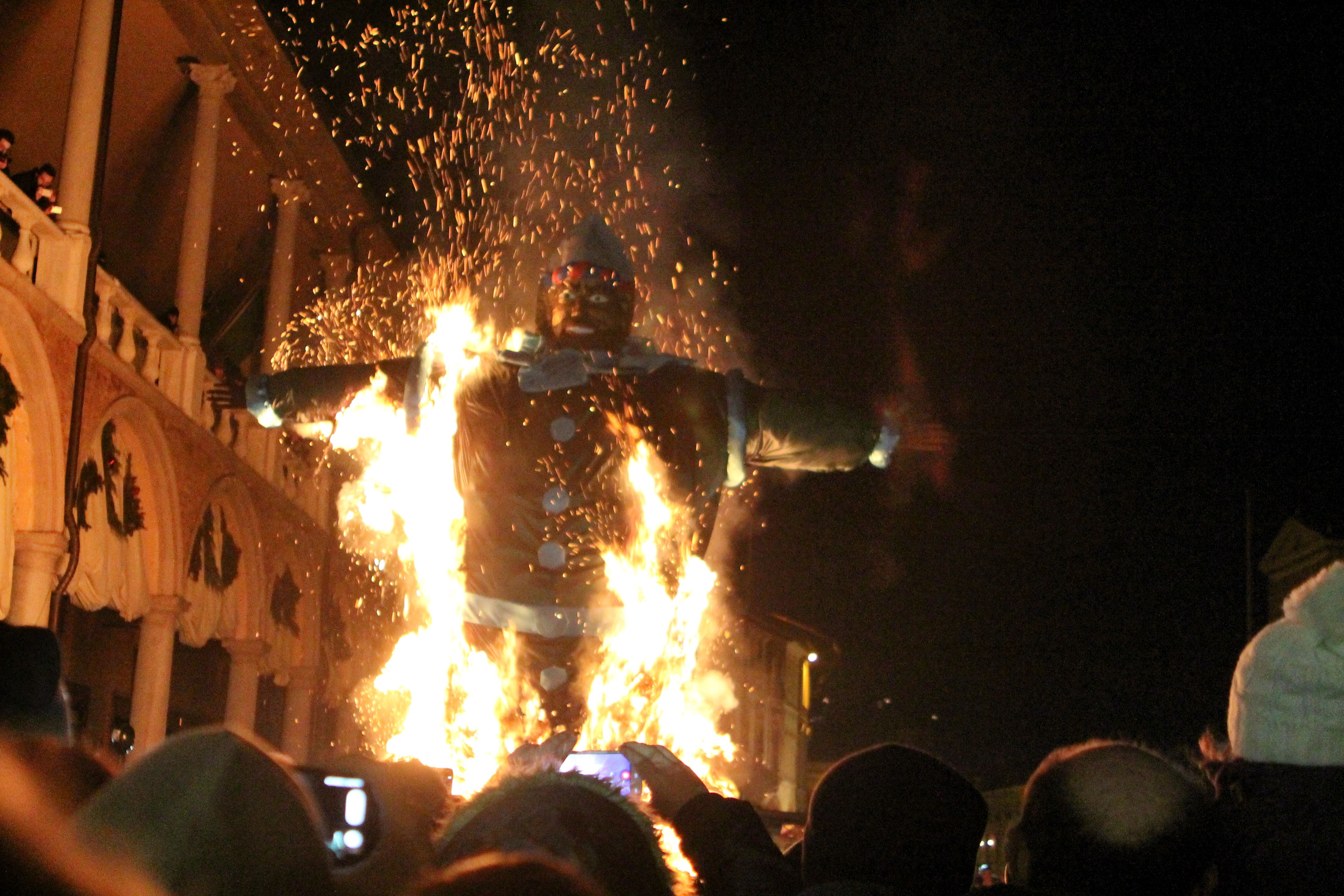
The Niballo set on fire in the square (2015)

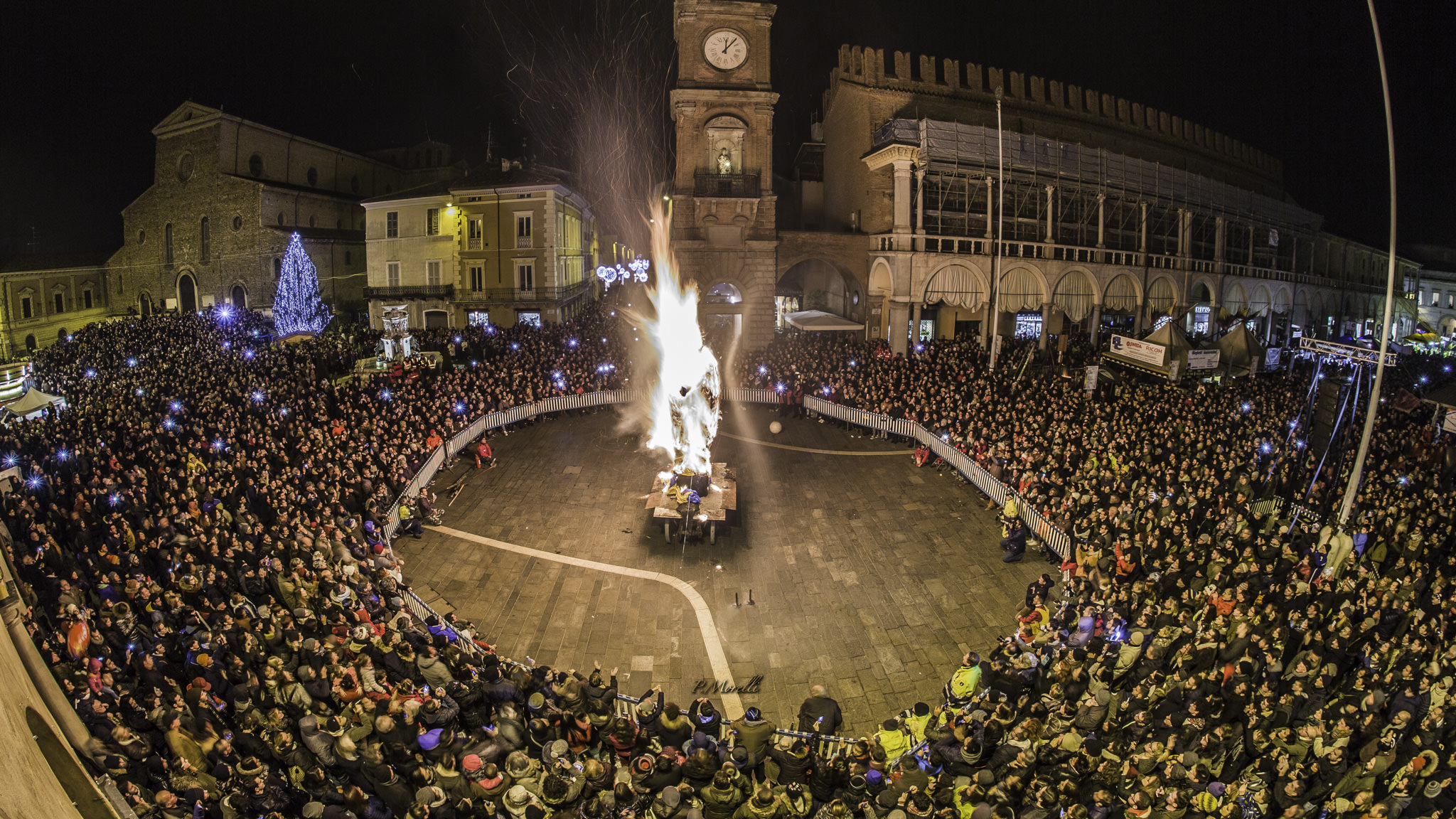
Niballo burning at the crossroads (2018)

Since 1964, an event linked to the Palio has been the "Nott de bisò" (night of the bisò), which takes place on the evening of 5 January in the Piazza del Popolo. The citizens gather in the heart of the city to celebrate around the food stands of the five districts, drinking the traditional "bisò" (the name for mulled wine in local dialect) prepared on site and sold in "gotti", small "cups" of Faenza ceramic decorated by hand, depicting the district symbols.

In the square at the main crossroads there is a large papier-mâché puppet depicting the Niballo and dressed in the colors of the winning district of the previous year. The Niballo is carried on a traditional Romagna cart pulled by oxen. At midnight the puppet is set on fire: for superstition the district members believe that this event can predict the district that will be successful in the new year (in fact, they believe that the head of the Saracen in flames, falling, indicates with its direction the stand of the "lucky" district).

=== Donation of Candles ===
The traditional “Donazione dei Ceri” ceremony kicks off the initiatives related to the Palio del Niballo. The ceremony was born in 1997 and takes place in the cathedral on the occasion of the celebrations for the Blessed Virgin of Graces, patron saint of the city, on the Saturday before the second Sunday of May.

Each district delegation is made up of a drummer, two flag-wavers, a candle-bearer, the district leader, a banner-bearer and two armed men, while that of the Municipal Group is made up of three clarions, two drummers, a banner-bearer, a candle-bearer, the regent of the municipal group, two armed men, the Podestà of the Giostra, a valet and three small wheels.

Arriving in front of the Cathedral, the clarions and the drummers line up on the parvis, respectively to the left and right of the main door, while the flag-wavers line up along the steps of the Cathedral. After a few clarion calls and drum rolls, the delegations of the Municipal Group and the Districts enter the Cathedral: the banner bearers and the armed men stand to the left of the main altar, the flag-wavers and the musicians to the right, while the district leaders, the candle-bearers and the Podestà of the Giostra (Mayor of the Joust) stand in the first central benches, immediately behind the city authorities. Near the main door, a small wheel and the valet remain, guarding a table with the weapons placed by the armed men at the entrance (in fact, in church, one must enter unarmed). The Eucharistic celebration begins.

At the offertory, the Rioni and the Municipal Group, one at a time, donate the candle (each candle is over a meter and a half high, with a diameter of about ten centimeters) with their coat of arms to the Blessed Virgin of Graces, the patron saint of the city. In the donation to the officiant, the candle holder is accompanied by the district dealer. After the custodians have returned to their positions, the bishop delivers the banner of the Palio del Niballo to the city, represented by the Mayor and the Municipal Group. At the end of the Holy Mass, the Palio is placed in the Chapel of the Madonna delle Grazie and remains there, visible to all citizens, until 4 pm on the day of the Palio, when the Podestà of the Giostra, together with the Palio holder, takes it to carry it to the stadium where the race will take place.

== See also ==
- Faenza
- Palio
- Medieval tournament
