= Santa Maria a Scò =

Church building in Pian di Scò, Italy

Coordinates: 43.6453°N 11.5479°E

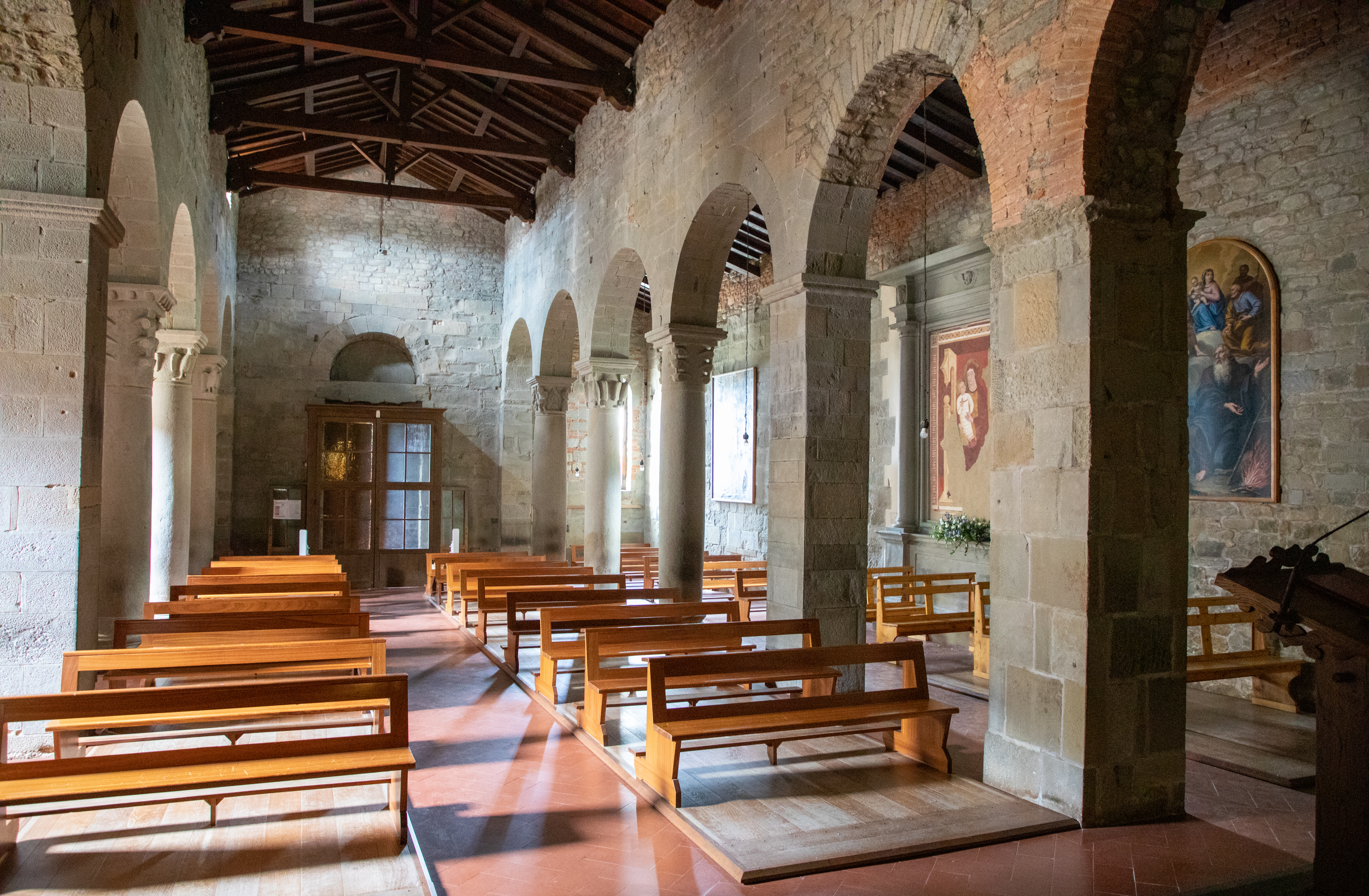
View of interior of church from the altar.

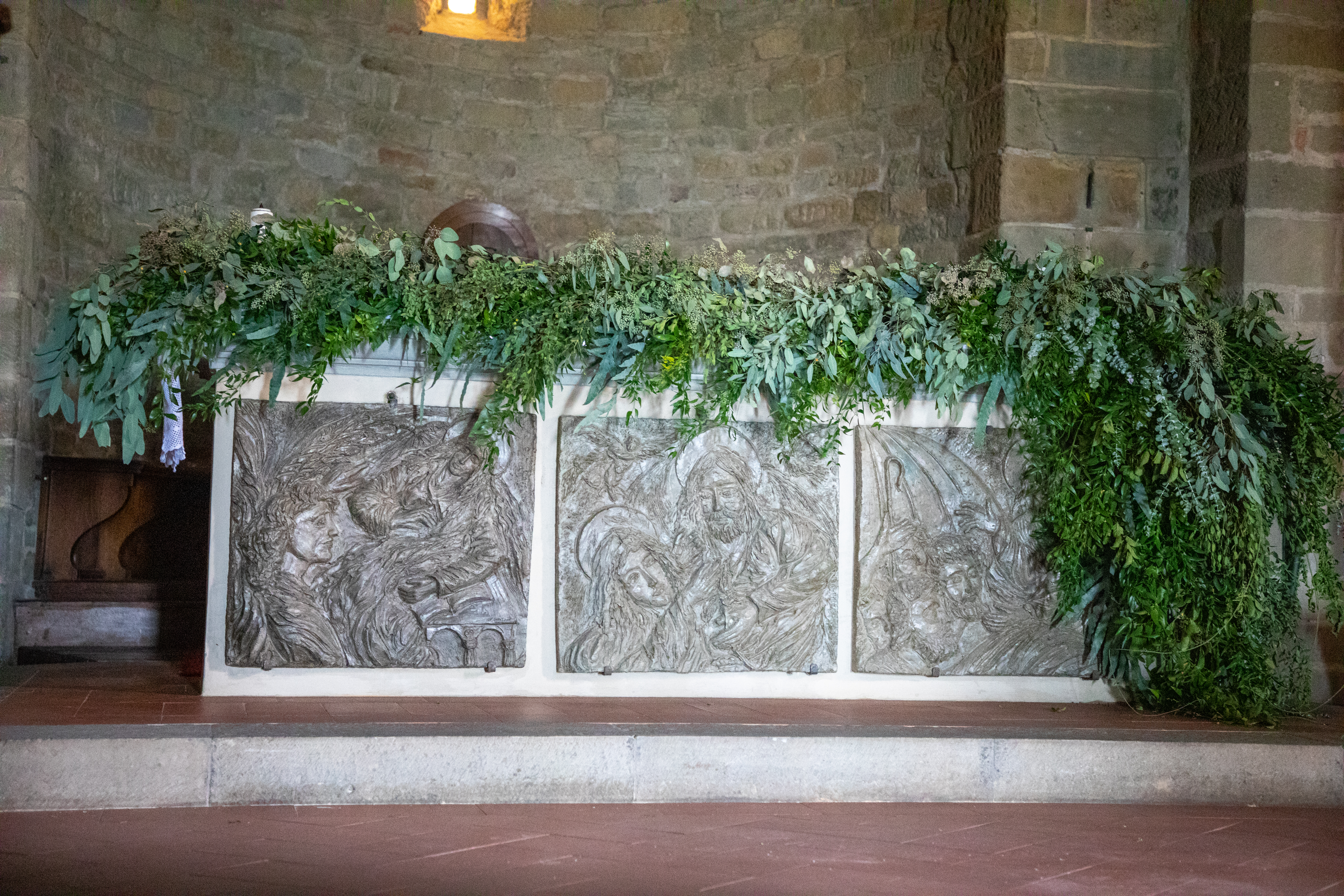
Church Altar

Santa Maria a Scò is a romanesque-style, Roman Catholic parish church located on the strada dei Sette Ponti, in the town of Castelfranco Piandiscò, in the Valdarno of the region of Tuscany, Italy.

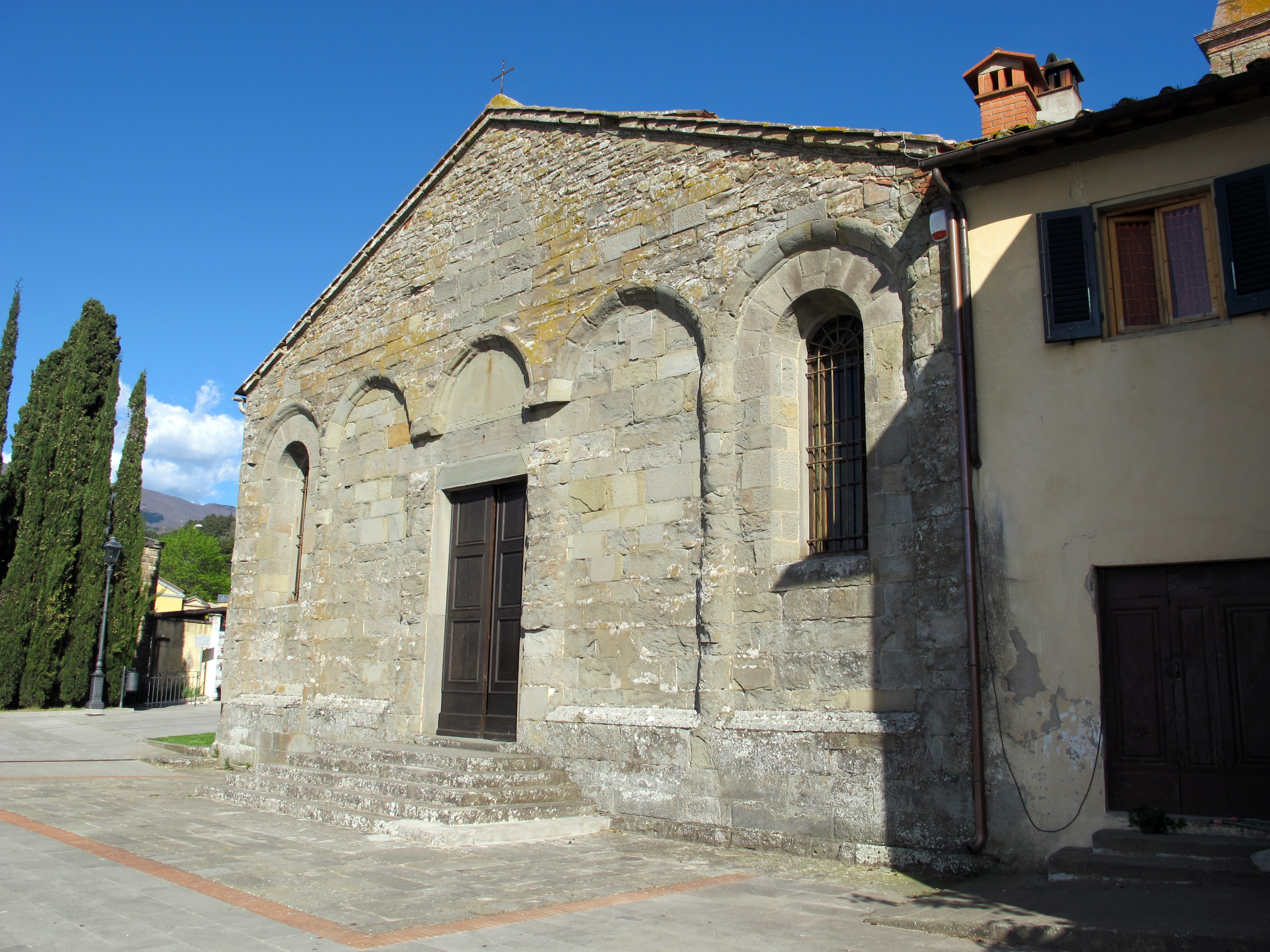
Facade of church

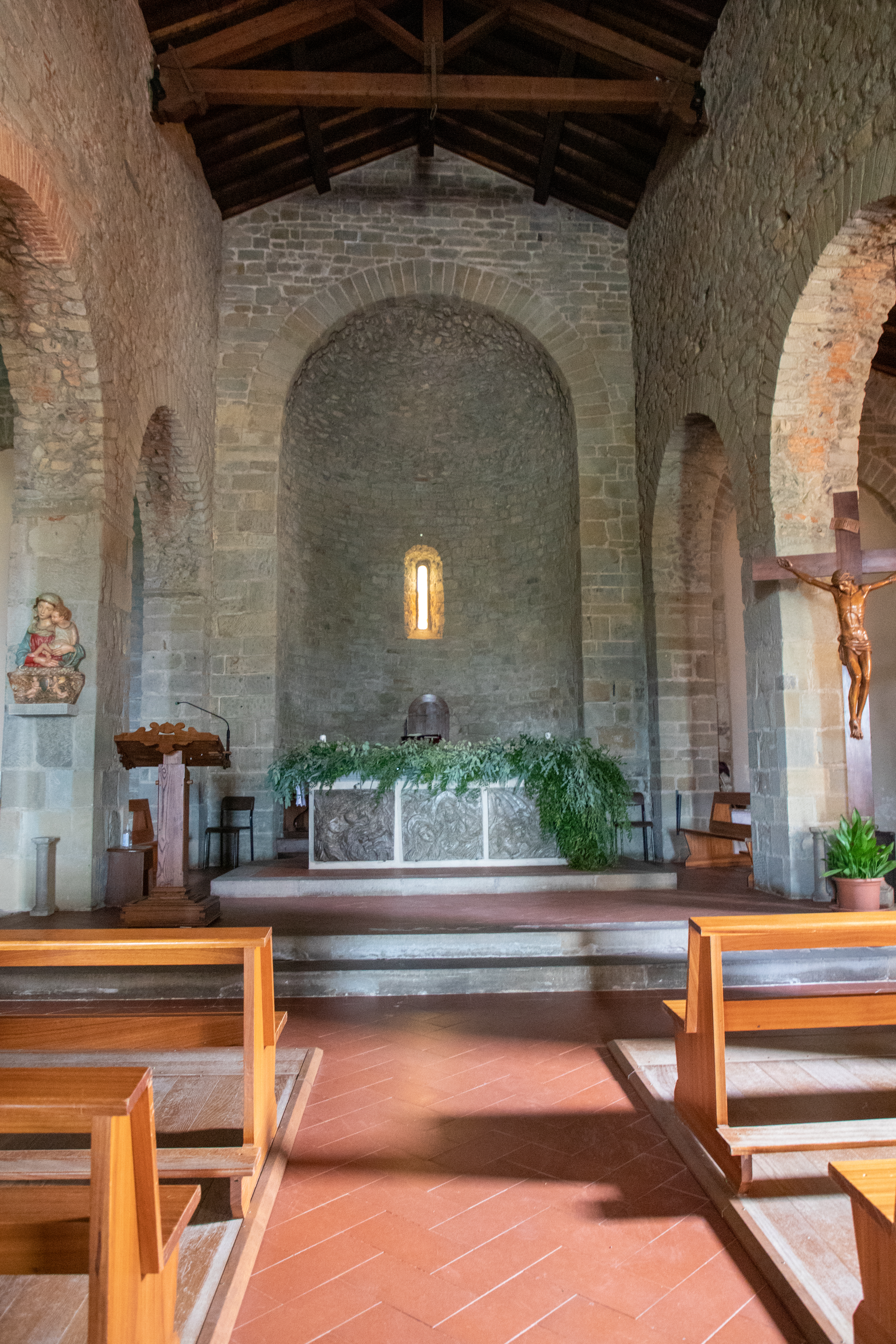
View of the altar.

== History ==
This pieve church was first documented in 1008, when it was placed under the control of the Abbey of Santa Trinita in Alpe. Documents show that the church was by 1259 offered baptisms.

The exterior is plain. The interior has columns with sculpted capitals. The church contains a fresco depicting an Enthroned Madonna with Child Blessing attributed to Paolo Schiavo. The main altar now contains bas-reliefs with Life of Mary (2008) by Mauro Capitani. Frescoes near the entrance are attributed to Luberto da Montevarchi.
