= Faella =

- Frazione
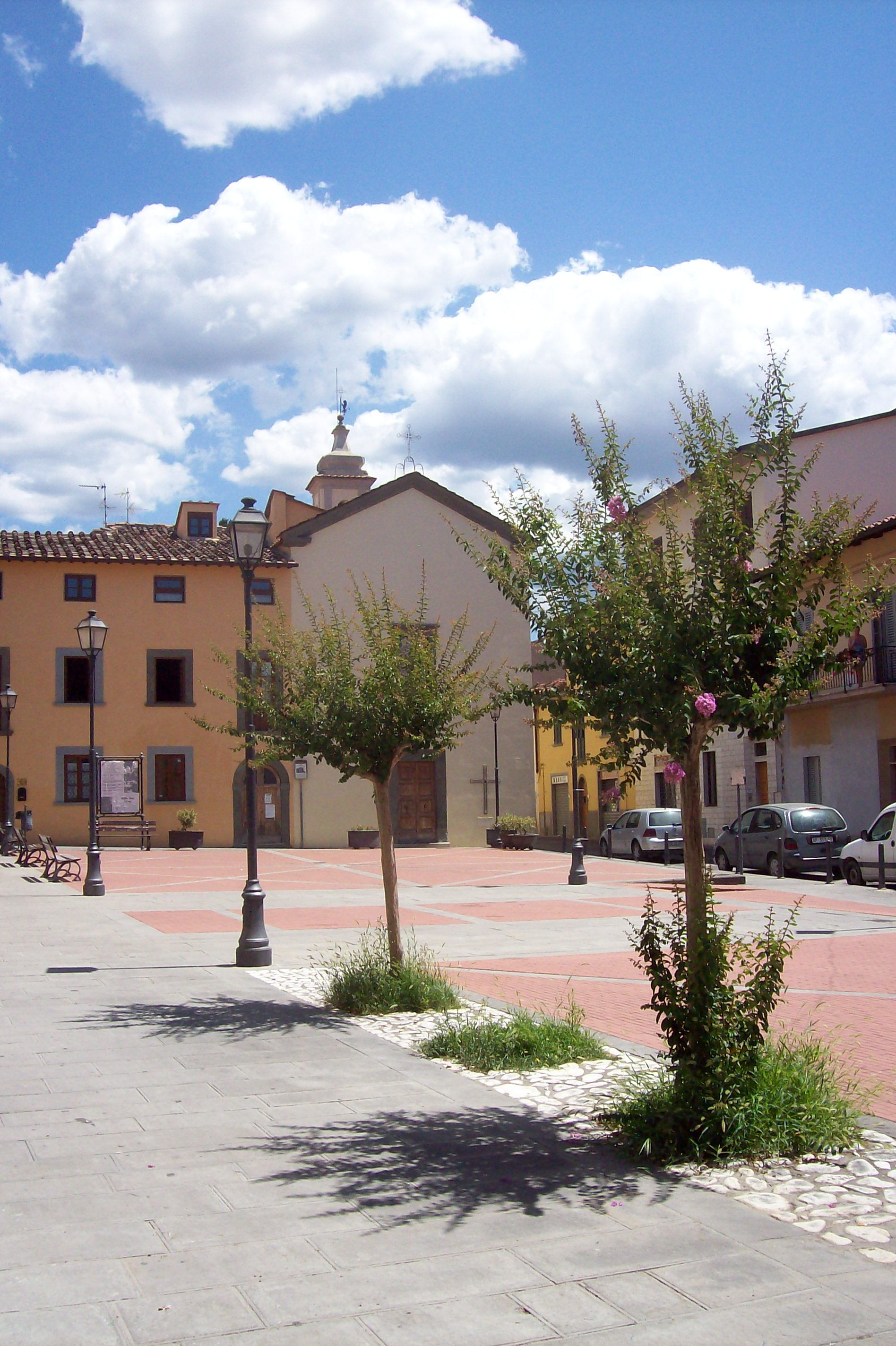
- Square Matteotti in Faella

- Location of Faella in Italy
- Coordinates: 43.62621°N 11.51657°E
- Country: Italy
- Region: Tuscany
- Province: Province of Arezzo
- Comune: Pian di Scò
- Elevation: 146 m (479 ft)

Population
  - Total: 2,157
- Demonym: faellesi
- Time zone: UTC+1 (CET)
  - Summer (DST): UTC+2 (CEST)
- Postal code: 52020
- Dialing code: 055

Faella is a frazione of Pian di Scò in the Province of Arezzo in the Italian region of Tuscany, located about 30 km southeast of Florence and about 35 km northwest of Arezzo, in the Valdarno.

Faella borders the following municipalities: Castelfranco di Sopra, Figline Valdarno, Reggello.

== History ==
The village of Faella was built near a castle belonging to Renuccino Ranieri and recalled in 1168. In 1204 Faella belonged to the family of Quona and, later, Alberto Ranieri Ricasoli, as recounted in one of the works of the canon lawyer and writer Lapo da Castiglionchio the Elder.

Faella, during the Middle Ages was placed in the Contado Florentine therefore subject to Florence, his Comune and to his “Signoria”. When, from 1250, the city was divided into Sestieri, Faella was assigned to the "Sesto di San Piero". In the 14th century, when the “sestieri” were replaced by Neighbourhood, it was included in the neighbourhood “San Giovanni". After the construction of the fortress of Castelfranco di Sopra, in the 1299, Faella was called to be part of the "League of Castelfranco," along with thirteen villages who made up the community.

In 1773, with the reform of the Leopold II, Holy Roman Emperor, Faella is inserted into the Community of Castelfranco di Sopra. In 1811, during the French invasion, was instead moved into the Community of Pian di Sco. Following the administrative reorganization of the Grand Duchy of Tuscany, the Community of Pian di Sco passed in 1825, on the province of Arezzo. Even Faella, therefore, began to be part of the province of Arezzo.

During the World War II, at the dawn of July 27, 1944, Faella was completely destroyed. To slow the march of the Allied armies, the Germans blew up buildings, roads and bridges. Much of the artistic heritage of the village was destroyed.
