= Palio di Parma =

Yearly festival in Parma, Italy

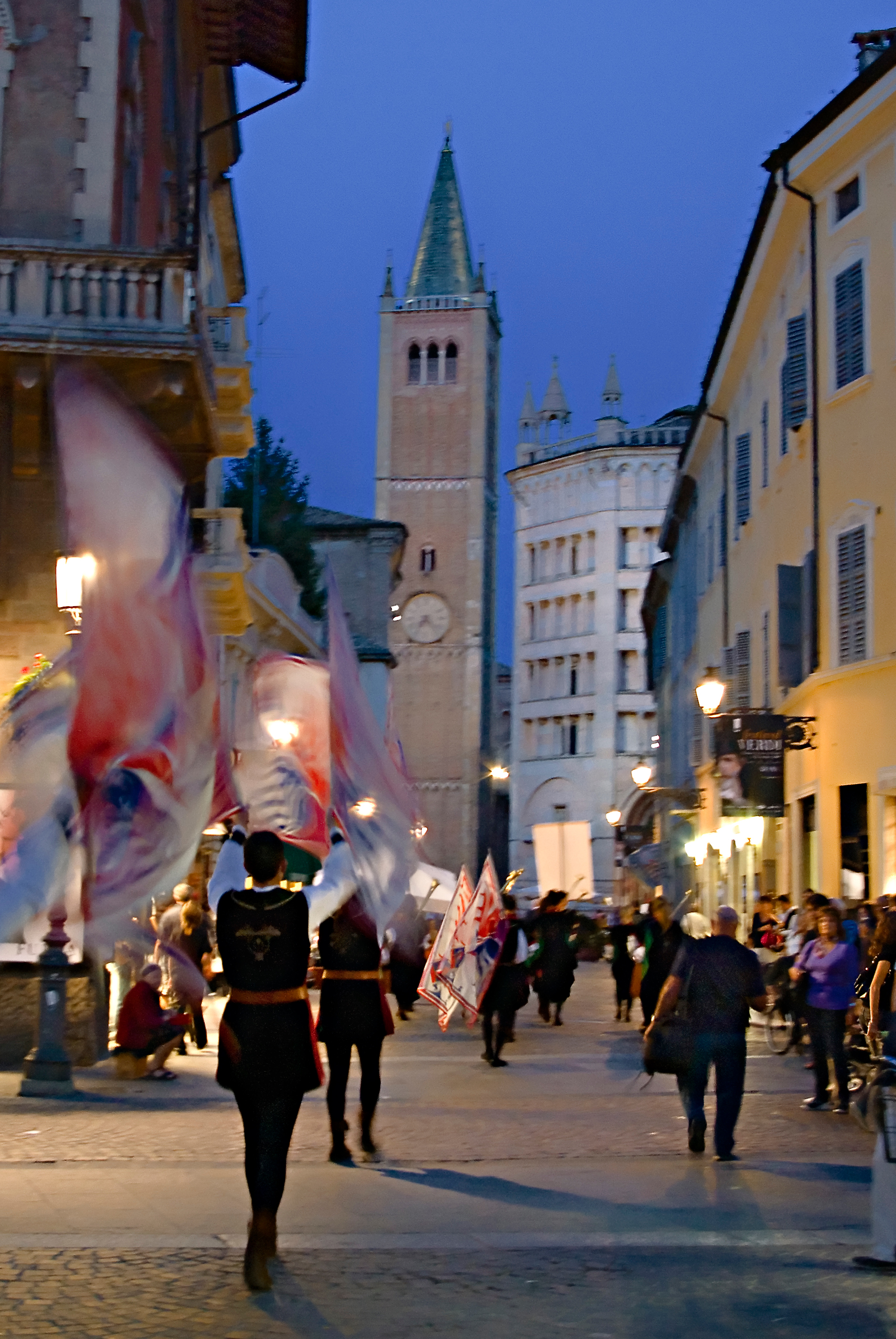
Flag wavers and people in medieval clothes going to the Parma Cathedral

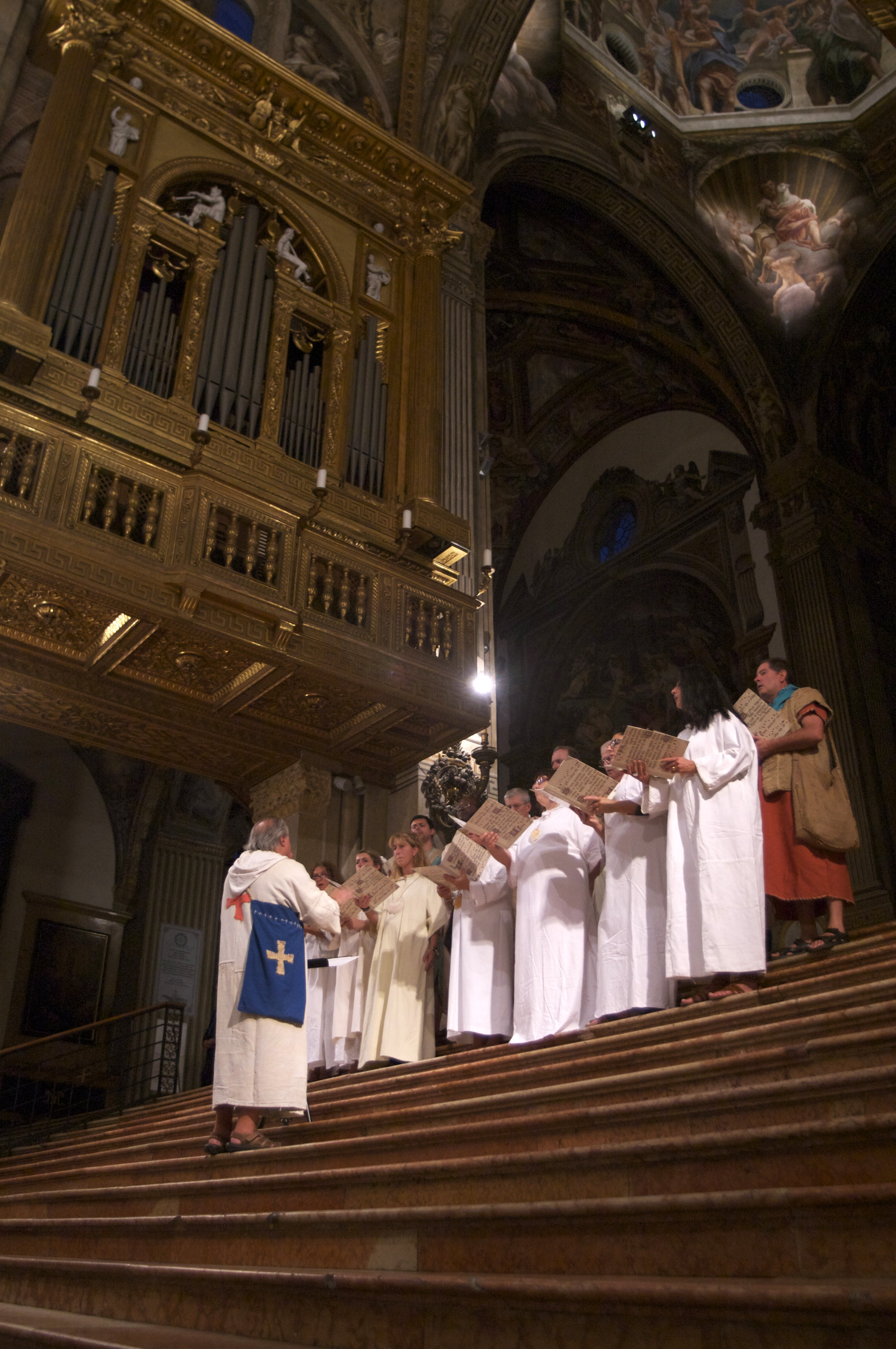
Medieval Chor during the Palio blessing ceremony

The Palio di Parma is a festival that is held once a year in the northern Italian town of Parma, and traces back to the ancient "Scarlet Run". The Palio is normally hold on the third weekend of September.

== History ==
The origin of this festival can be reconducted to 1314 as reported by Giovanni Del Giudice in the "Chronicon Parmense", talking about a festival hold to honour the engagement between Giberto III Da Correggio, ruler of Parma from 1303 to 1316, and Engelenda Rossi, also called Maddalena Rossi di San Secondo daughter of Guglielmo Rossi and Donella da Carrara rulers of Padova. This brought to an end of the several fight among their noble families wanting to dominate Parma. On that day, all the enemy families of Giberto Da Correggio were allowed to return in Parma, and even some prisoners gained back freedom. The games consisted in several competition with medieval weapons and horses. The festival was held every year on 15 August, from the fourteenth century to Napoleon's arrival in the nineteenth century.

== Nowadays ==
Starting from 1978 the competition was brought to a new life. The town is divided in 5 different areas called "Porte", referring to its ancient gates. Each of them forms a different team. There are 3 running competitions, one for men, one for women and one for children riding donkeys. In each of them the porte try to win a painting showing one of the monuments of the town and Holy Mary, protector of Parma.

== Porte ==
Porta di Santa Croce
| Heraldic badge | Colours | Territory | Church |
|---|---|---|---|
| Eagle | Green | Via d'Azeglio, Piazzale Inzani, Via Imbriani (lato nord), Via Gramsci, Viale Piacenza, Via Fleming, Via Buffolara, Via Savani, indicativamente tutta la zona nord Ovest della città. | Chiesa di Santa Croce (Parma) (piazzale Santa Croce) |

Porta San Francesco
| Heraldic badge | Colours | Territory | Church |
|---|---|---|---|
| Wolf | Black and White | Strada Bixio, lato sud di via D'Azeglio dal Ponte all'Annunziata, Via della Costituente, Via Imbriani (lato sud), Via della Salute, Viale Spezia, Viale Milazzo, Via Silvio Pellico, Viale Milazzo, indicativamente tutta la zona sud Ovest della città. | Chiesa della Santissima Annunziata (Parma) (Strada d'Azeglio) |

Porta Nuova
| Heraldic badge | Colours | Territory | Church |
|---|---|---|---|
| Unicorn | Blue | Strada Farini, Borgo Giacomo, Via XXII Luglio, Borgo Felino, Viale Basetti, Viale Martiri della Libertà, Viale Solferino, Viale Rustici, indicativamente la zona sud della città. | Chiesa di Sant'Uldarico (Strada Farini) |

Porta San Michele
| Heraldic badge | Colours | Territory | Church |
|---|---|---|---|
| Dragon | Yellow | Strada della Repubblica, Via Dalmazia, Viale Tanara, Strada Elevata, Viale Partigiani d'Italia, Viale Pier Maria Rossi, Via Zarotto, Via Emilia Est, indicativamente tutta la zona est della città. | Chiesa di San Sepolcro (Parma) (via della Repubblica) |

Porta San Barnaba
| Heraldic badge | Colours | Territory | Church |
|---|---|---|---|
| Lion | Red | Strada Garibaldi, Strada Cavour, Borgo Parmigianino, Via Verdi, Viale Toscanini, Viale Fratti, Via Trento, Strada San Leonardo, Via Palermo, Via Europa, indicativamente tutta la zona nord est della città. | Chiesa di San Francesco del Prato (piazzale San Francesco) |

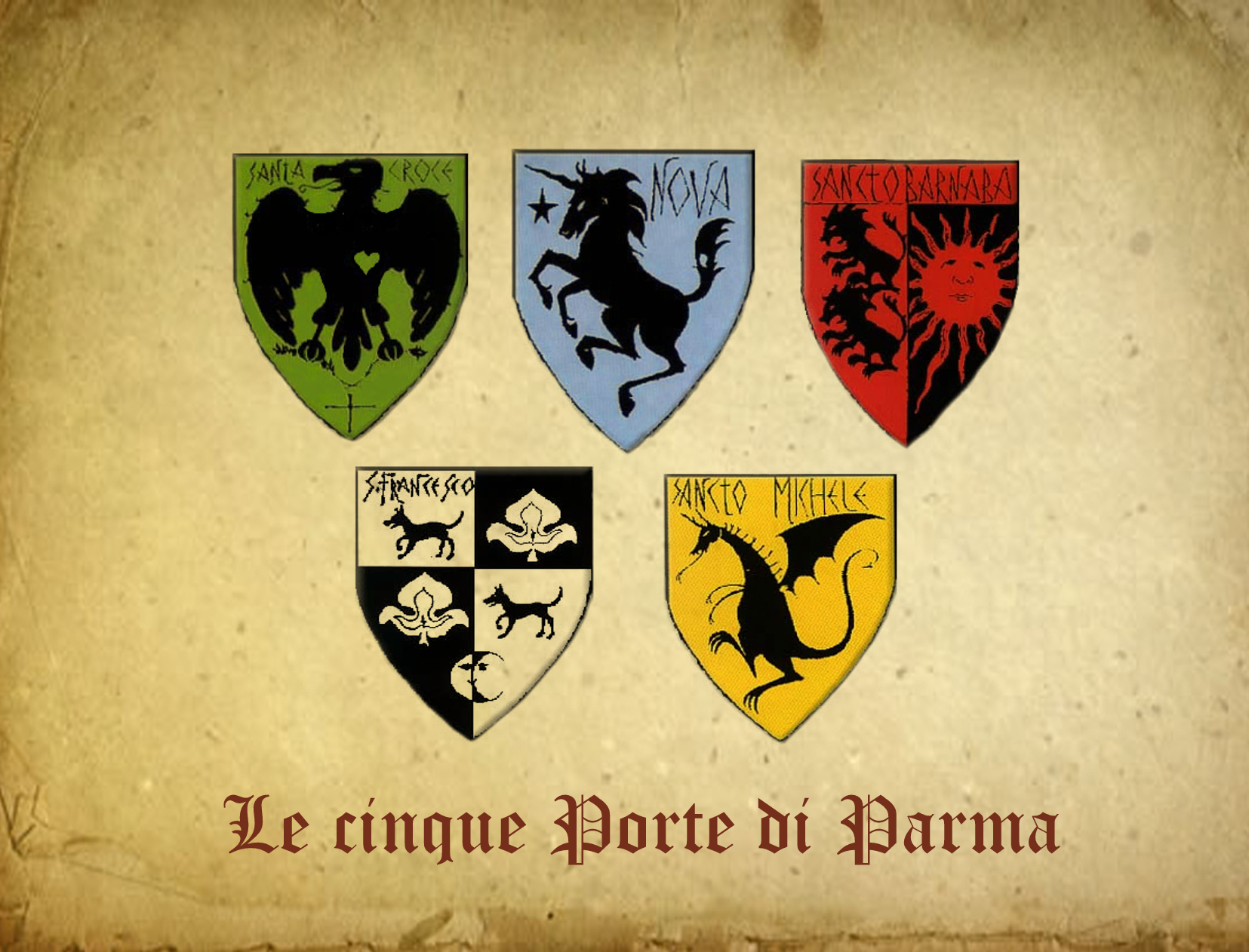
The symbols of the five porte of Parma

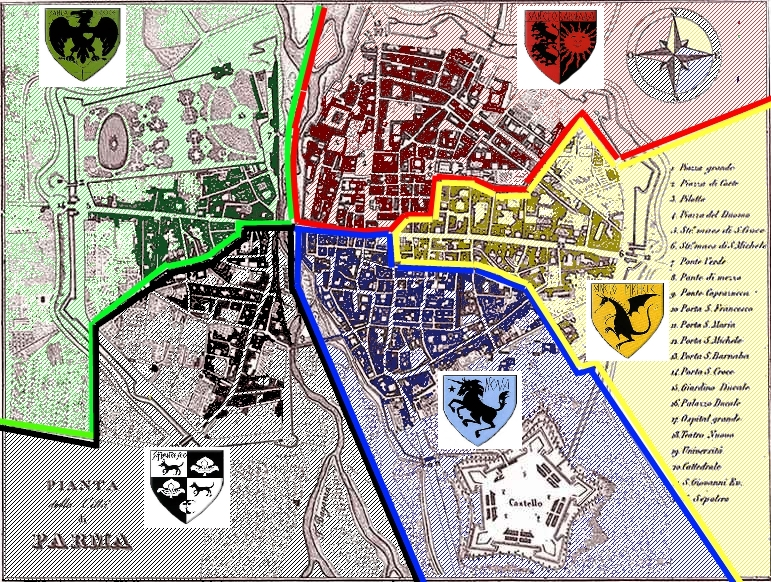
Map showing the division of the historical center into five porte

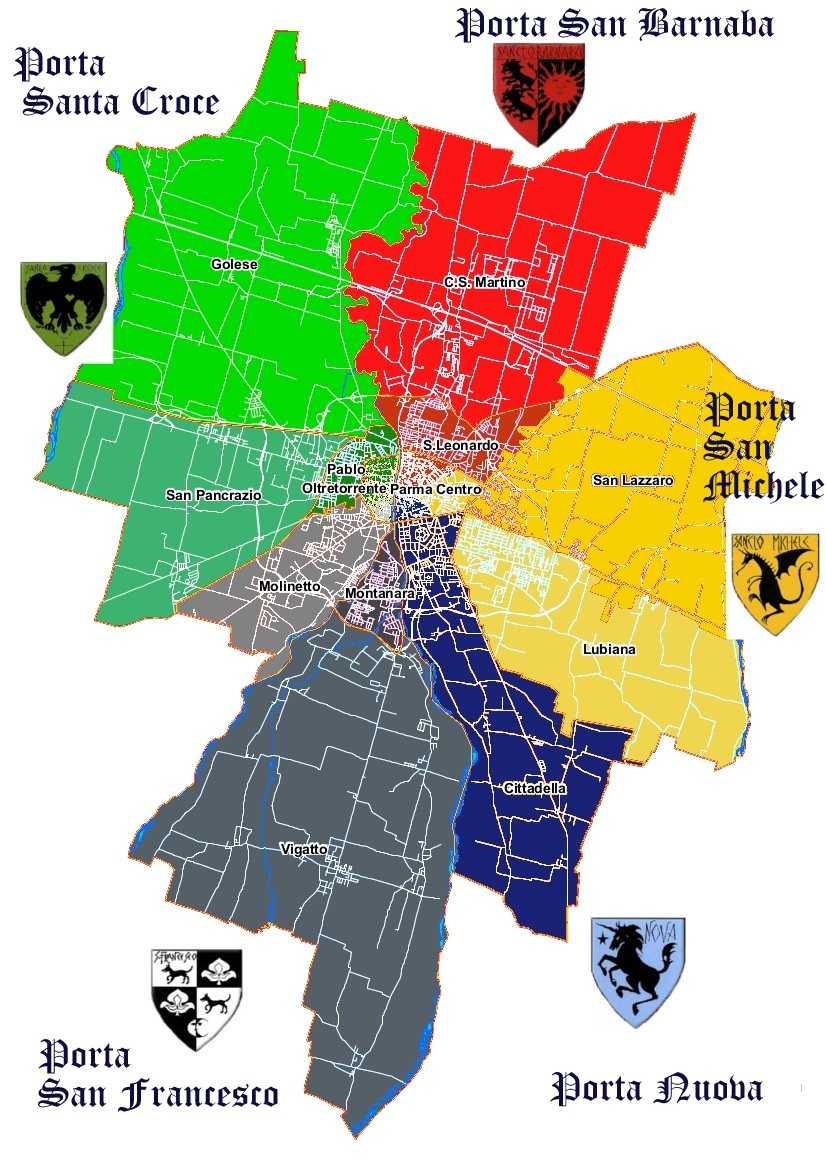
Map showing the whole city of Parma divided among the five porte

=== Winning porta ===
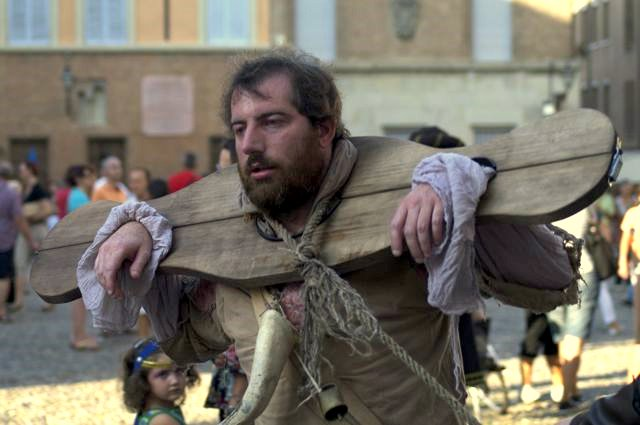
Prisoner

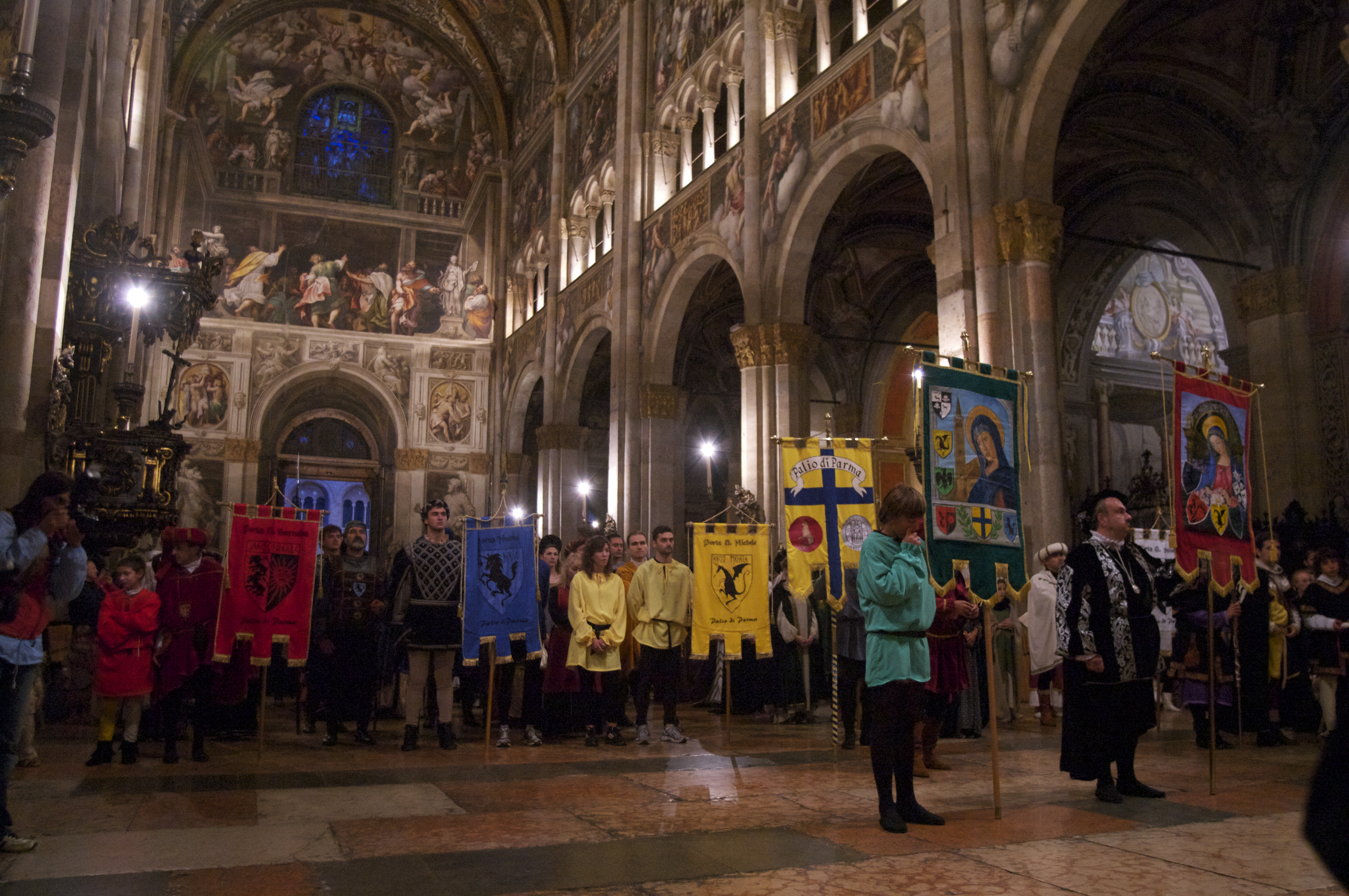
Blessing ceremony

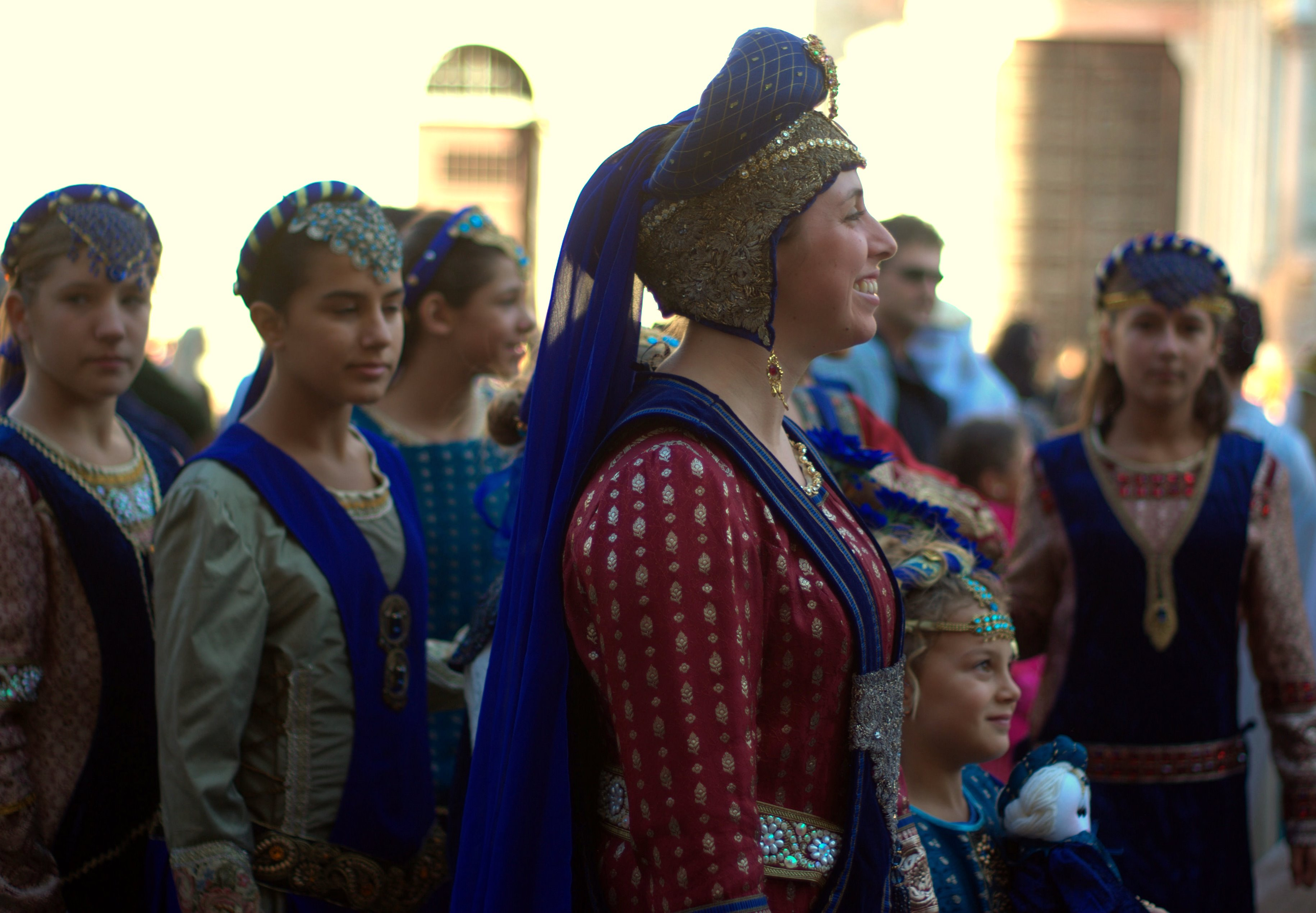
Inhabitants of Parma in medieval clothes

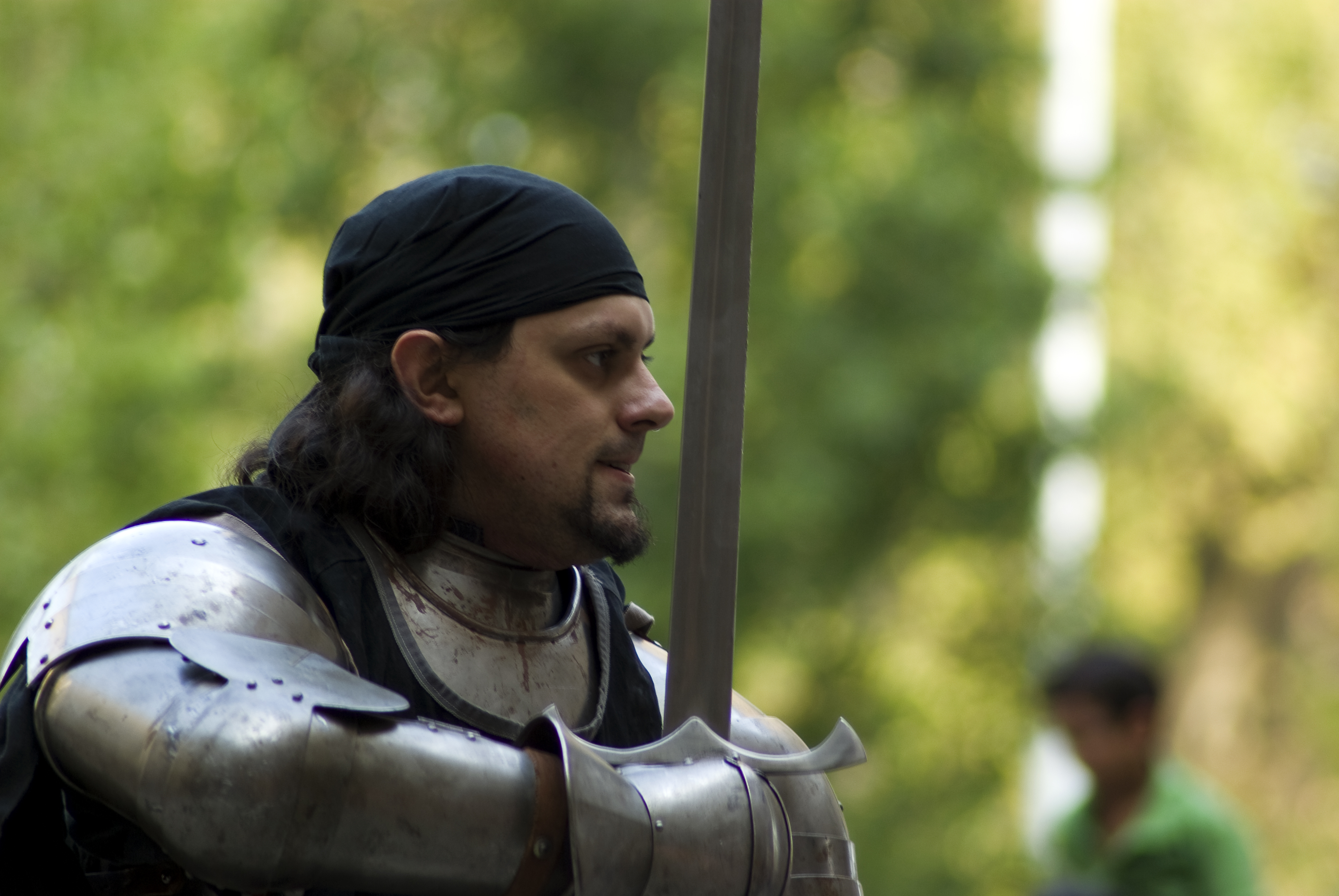
Medieval warrior

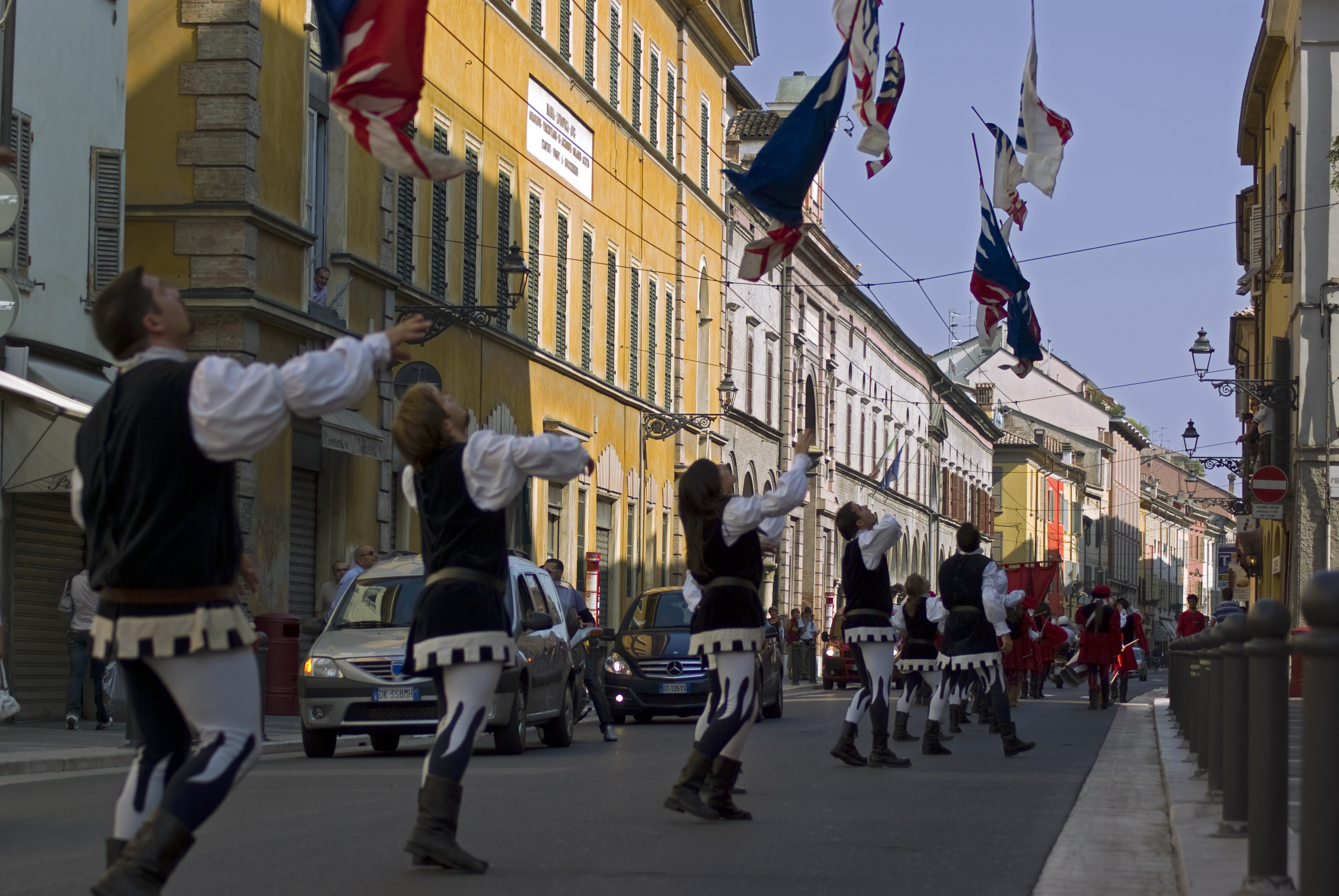
Flag wavers reaching the area of the competitions

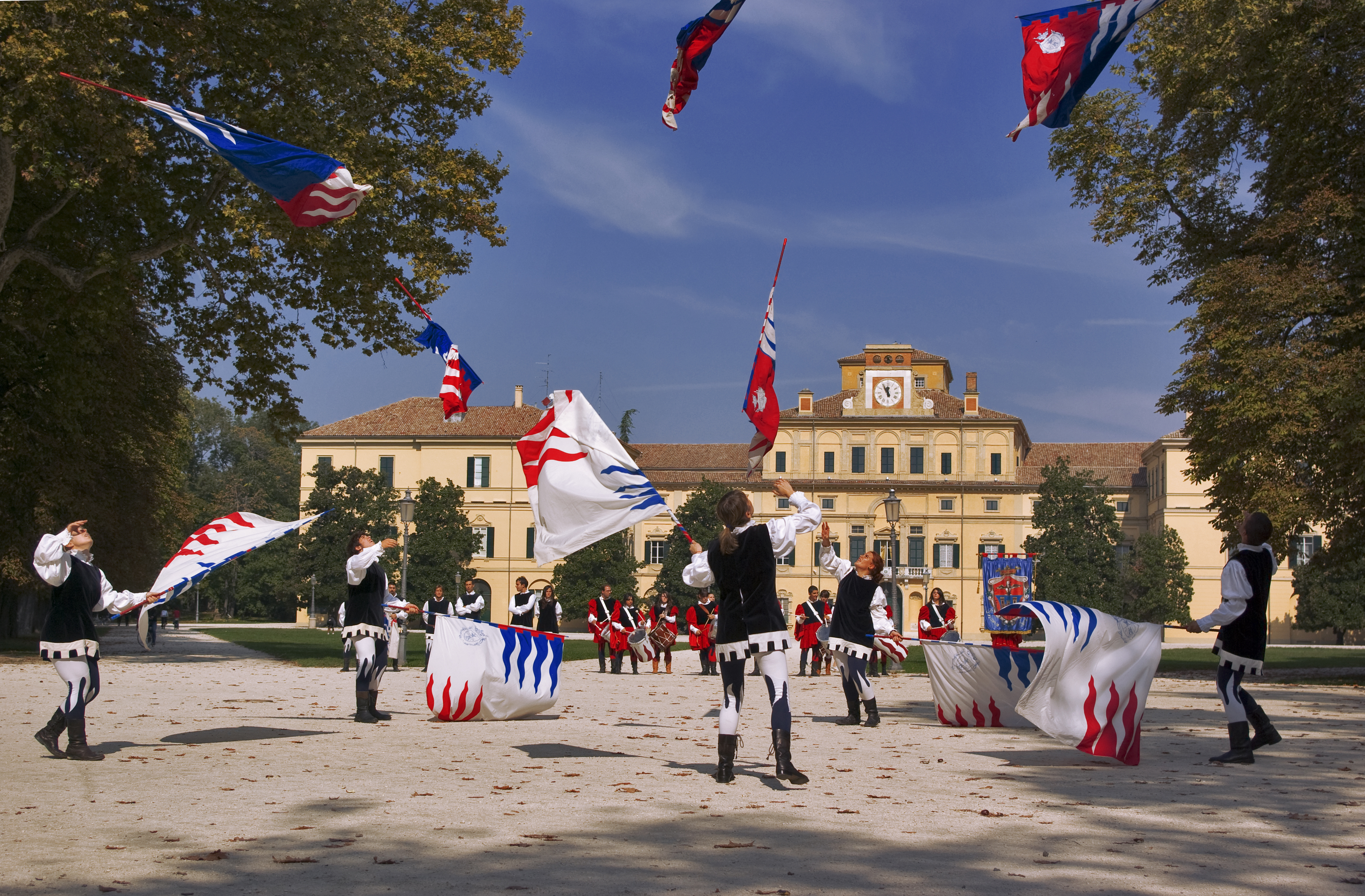
Palio di Parma - Flag wavers in front of the ducal palace, territory of the Porta di Santa Croce

Corsa dello Scarlatto (men)
| Year | Winning porta |
|---|---|
| 1978 | Porta San Francesco |
| 1979 | Porta San Michele ^{2} |
| 1980 | Porta San Michele ^{2} |
| 1981 | Porta San Michele |
| 1982 | Porta San Michele |
| 1984 | Porta San Francesco |
| 1986 | Porta San Michele |
| 1988 | Porta Santa Croce |
| 1991 | Porta San Michele |
| 1993 | Porta San Michele |
| 1995 | Porta San Michele |
| 1996 | Porta San Michele |
| 1997 | Porta San Francesco |
| 1998 | Porta San Michele |
| 1999 | Porta San Michele |
| 2000 | Porta San Michele |
| 2001 | Not held |
| 2002 | Porta San Michele |
| 2003 | Porta San Francesco |
| 2004 | Porta San Francesco |
| 2005 | Porta San Francesco |
| 2006 | Porta San Michele |
| 2007 | Porta San Francesco |
| 2008 | Porta San Francesco |
| 2009 | Porta San Francesco |
| 2010 | Porta San Francesco |
| 2011 | Porta San Francesco |
| 2012 | Porta Nuova |
| 2013 | Porta San Francesco |
| 2014 | Porta San Francesco |
| 2015 | Porta San Francesco |
| 2016 | Porta San Francesco |
| 2017 | Porta San Francesco |
| 2018 | Porta San Francesco |
| 2019 | Not held (heavy rain) |
| 2020 | Not held (COVID) |
| 2021 | Not held (different version) |
| 2022 | Porta San Michele |
| 2023 | Porta Nuova |
| 2024 | Porta Santa Croce |
| 2025 | Porta San Michele |

Corsa del Panno Verde (women)
| Year | Winning porta |
|---|---|
| 1991 | Porta San Barnaba |
| 1993 | Porta San Michele |
| 1995 | Porta San Michele |
| 1996 | Porta San Barnaba |
| 1997 | Porta San Barnaba |
| 1999 | Porta San Barnaba |
| 2000 | Porta San Michele |
| 2001 | Not held |
| 2002 | Porta San Barnaba |
| 2003 | Porta San Barnaba |
| 2004 | Porta San Barnaba |
| 2005 | Porta San Francesco |
| 2006 | Porta San Francesco |
| 2007 | Porta Nuova |
| 2008 | Porta Santa Croce |
| 2009 | Porta Santa Croce |
| 2010 | Porta Santa Croce |
| 2011 | Porta Santa Croce |
| 2012 | Porta Santa Croce |
| 2013 | Porta San Francesco |
| 2014 | Porta San Michele |
| 2015 | Porta Nuova |
| 2016 | Porta Nuova |
