= Pian di Scò =

Frazione in Tuscany, Italy

- Frazione
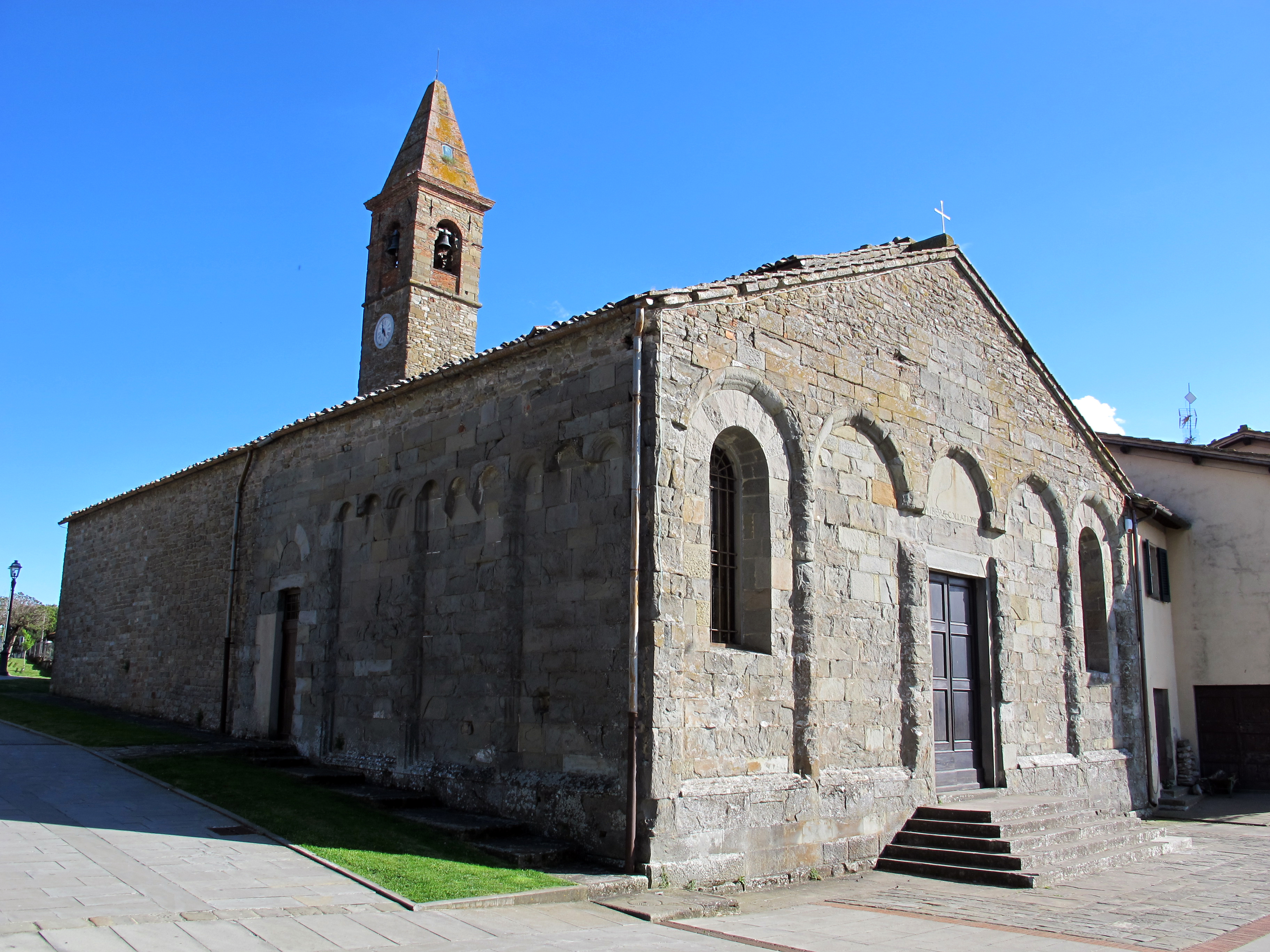
- The Santa Maria a Scò.

- Location of Pian di Scò in Italy
- Coordinates: 43.6428°N 11.5461°E
- Country: Italy
- Region: Tuscany
- Province: Arezzo
- Comune: Castelfranco Piandiscò
- Elevation: 349 m (1,145 ft)

Population (2001)
  - Total: 1,955
- Time zone: UTC+1 (CET)
  - Summer (DST): UTC+2 (CEST)
- Postal code: 52026

Santa Maria a Scò, the parish church.

Pian di Scò is a frazione (municipality) in the Province of Arezzo in the Italian region Tuscany, located about 30 kilometres (19 mi) southeast of Florence and about 35 kilometres (22 mi) northwest of Arezzo, in the Valdarno. It was a separate commune until 2014, when it was merged with Castelfranco di Sopra: the new municipality name is Castelfranco Piandiscò.

It has around 1955 inhabitants in 2001.

== Main sights ==
- Pieve of Santa Maria a Scò. Documented from as early as 1008, is a medieval Pleban church located an Etruscan ancient road, partially. It has one nave and two aisles in Romanesque style; the capital of the internal columns are decorated with vegetable, animal and anthropomorphic figures. Artworks include a fresco of Madonna Enthroned with the Child by Paolo Schiavo.
