= Monte San Savino =

- Comune
- Città di Monte San Savino
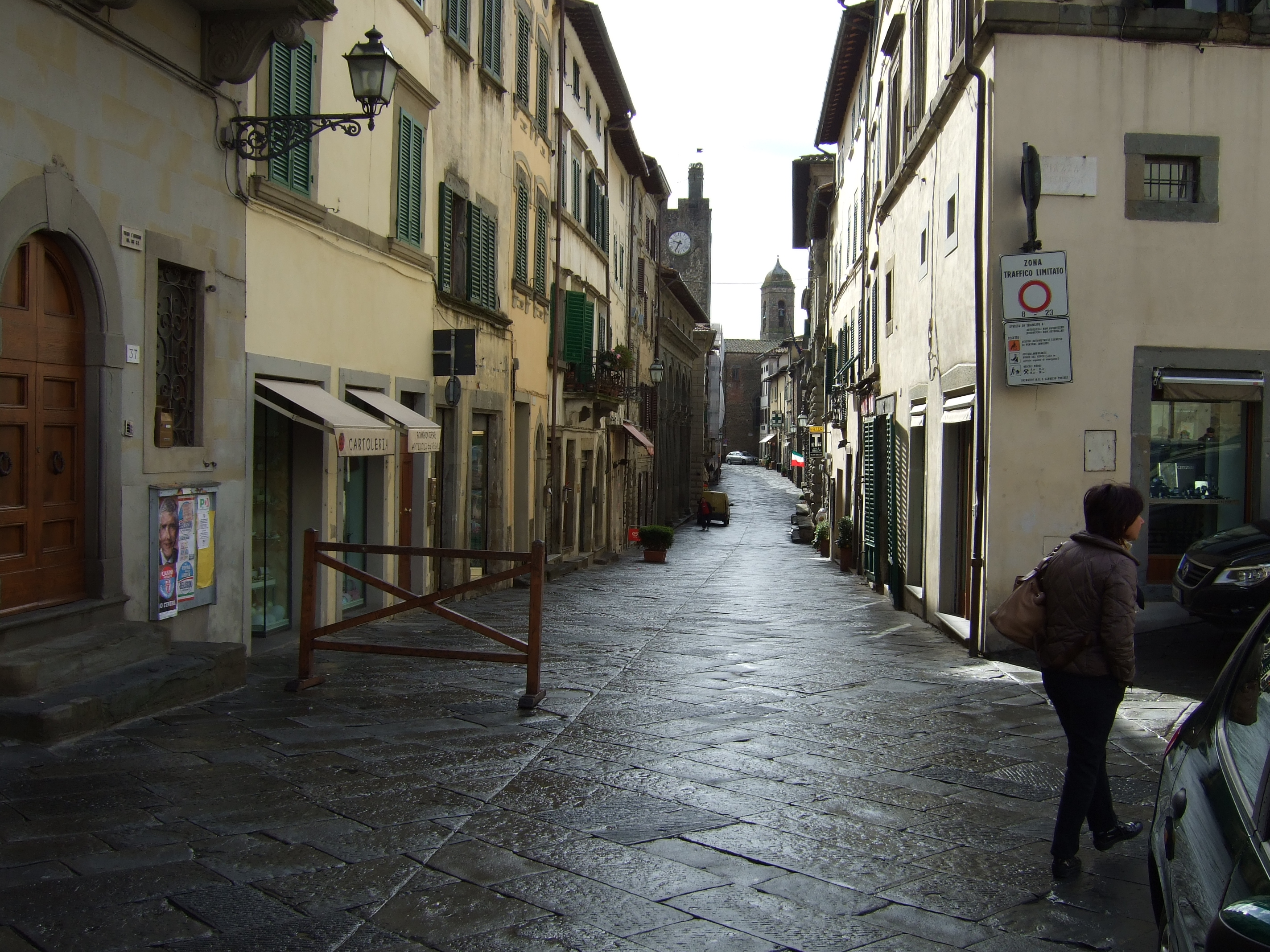
- View of Monte San Savino

- Coat of arms

- Location within Italy Location within Tuscany
- Coordinates: 43°20′N 11°44′E
- Country: Italy
- Region: Tuscany
- Province: Arezzo (AR)
- Frazioni: Alberoro, Dreini, Gargonza, Montagnano, Palazzuolo, Verniana

Government
  - Mayor: Gianni Bennati

Area
  - Total: 89.66 km^{2} (34.62 sq mi)
- Elevation: 330 m (1,080 ft)

Population (3o November 2017)
  - Total: 8,676
  - Density: 96.77/km^{2} (250.6/sq mi)
- Demonym: Savinesi
- Time zone: UTC+1 (CET)
  - Summer (DST): UTC+2 (CEST)
- Postal code: 52048
- Dialing code: 0575
- Patron saint: Saint Savinus
- Saint day: December 7
- Website: Official website

Monte San Savino is a town and comune in the province of Arezzo, Tuscany (Italy). It is located on the Essa stream in the Valdichiana. Several of its frazioni occupy higher hills, like Gargonza at 560 metres (1,840 ft) and Palazzuolo, at an elevation of 600 metres (2,000 ft).

== History ==
Monte San Savino was one of the first urban settlements in Tuscany, Italy. It originated around 1100, but a further century had to pass before Monte San Savino could be considered a centre of a certain social, political and cultural importance of Tuscany in those times. The town was home to a Jewish quarter and synagogue for nearly 2 centuries, which was later sold after forced flight of the Jews in 1799 following the Viva Maria movement.

== Main sights ==
- Palazzo di Monte
- Logge dei Mercanti
- Palazzo Pretorio
- Cassero
- Santi Tiburzio and Susanna: 13th-century church at Gargonza, housing Tuscan Renaissance paintings.
- Church of the Misericordia (1175, rebuilt in 1749). Its organ is one of the most ancient in Italy.
- Church of the Compagnia del Suffragio: closed 17th-century church with 19th-century frescoes by Luigi Ademollo
- Sant'Agostino early 14th century, enlarged in the 16th century). Conventhas a cloister from 1532. Both the church and the cloister were renovated by Andrea Sansovino (who was born here) in the early 16th century. The interior houses paintings by Spinello Aretino's school, by Paolo Schiavo and one Assumption by Giorgio Vasari.
- Sanctuary of Santa Maria delle Vertighe, rebuilt in the 16th century. It houses a panel of the Virgin Enthroned with Child by Margaritone and Restoro d'Arezzo and a diptych (1520) by Ridolfo Ghirlandaio.

== Notable people ==
- Pope Julius III
- Angelo Fantoni, Catholic priest and exorcist
- Giulio Salvadori, poet and educator
