= Synagogue of Monte San Savino =

Former synagogue in Monte San Savino

- Sinagoga di Monte San Savino
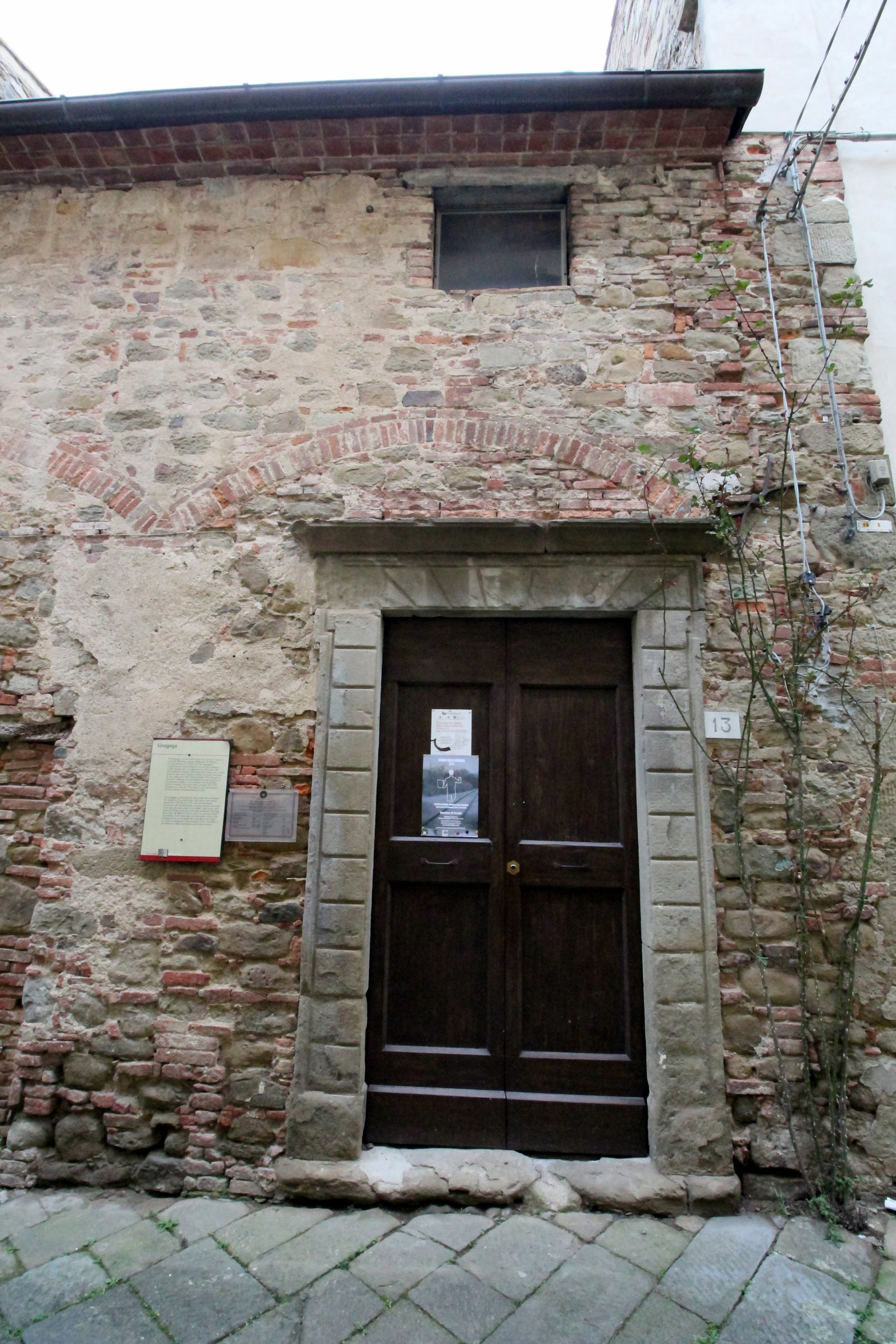
- Door to the synagogue

Religion
- Affiliation: Judaism
- Region: Tuscany
- Rite: Italian rite
- Ecclesiastical or organizational status: No longer active

Location
- Location: 13 Via Salomone Fiorentino, Monte San Savino
- Country: Italy
- Interactive map of Synagogue of Monte San Savino
- Coordinates: 43°19′56″N 11°43′31″E

Architecture
- Completed: 17th century (original build) 1732 (original restoration); 1924 (second restoration) 2004 (third restoration)
- Delisted: 1799

The Synagogue of Monte San Savino (Italian: Sinagoga di Monte San Savino) is a former Jewish synagogue located in Monte San Savino in Tuscany, Italy.

== History ==
The synagogue is located on Via Salomone Fiorentino, named for the Jewish-Italian poet of the same name. The road was an integral part of the Jewish ghetto in the city. It was built in the 17th century, and was heavily renovated between 1729 and 1732. The Jewish community initially only rented the bottom part of the building, which was used for the shul, but following a rejected request for a decrease in rent, they were forced to outright buy the building, including the floor above. The stuccoes with molded frames and false windows on the upper part of the building date back to that era. The upper part of the building has a stone frame where the hinges of the doors from the Torah ark remain. Similarly, the ends of clay pipes are visible that originally worked t o fill the ritual bath. Beams protruding from the wall indicate the height of the floors that used to divide the building. The pray services of the community were held on the bottom floor, and the offices and Talmud Torah were located above.

In 1799, following the Viva Maria uprising, the Jews were forced to abandon the city, and the synagogue ws sold to the Jewish University of Siena. It became state property in 1870, and later became private property. Following a 1923 collapse of the top floor, it was purchased by the municipality, and was restored most recently in 2004. In 2021, the town's Jewish site was one of a few in Tuscany that were part of a 4 million Euro effort to restore Jewish heritage locations.

== See also ==
- List of synagogues in Italy
