= Sanctuary of Santa Maria delle Vertighe =

Church and Sanctuary in Le Vertighe, Monte San Savino

- The façade of the sanctuary

- Location within Italy
- Location: Monte San Savino, Tuscany, Italy
- Denomination: Catholic

History
- Dedication: Mary

Architecture
- Style: Romanesque
- Groundbreaking: 1100
- Completed: XVI century

Administration
- Diocese: Diocese of Arezzo-Cortona-Sansepolcro

The Sanctuary of Santa Maria delle Vertighe is an important Marian sanctuary in Tuscany, located in the area of the same name in Monte San Savino, in the province of Arezzo.

== History and description ==
According to a popular tradition first recorded by the Camaldolese historian Agostino Fortunio in 1583, two noble brothers from Asciano in the Sienese countryside were engaged in a bitter dispute over ownership of a chapel containing a fresco of the Madonna in a mandorla. To prevent bloodshed, the chapel was miraculously transported by angels from Asciano to the hill of Vertighe on the night of 7 July 1100. The sanctuary soon became a popular pilgrimage site. In 1228, it came under the patronage of the Camaldolese monks from the Abbey of Agnano, who sent some of their number to oversee the church and assist pilgrims. In the late 13th century, Margaritone and Restoro d'Arezzo created a reredos depicting the Virgin and Child enthroned with four scenes from the life of the Virgin for the sanctuary. Signed and dated 1274, this panel is considered one of the most significant works of 13th-century Tuscan painting.

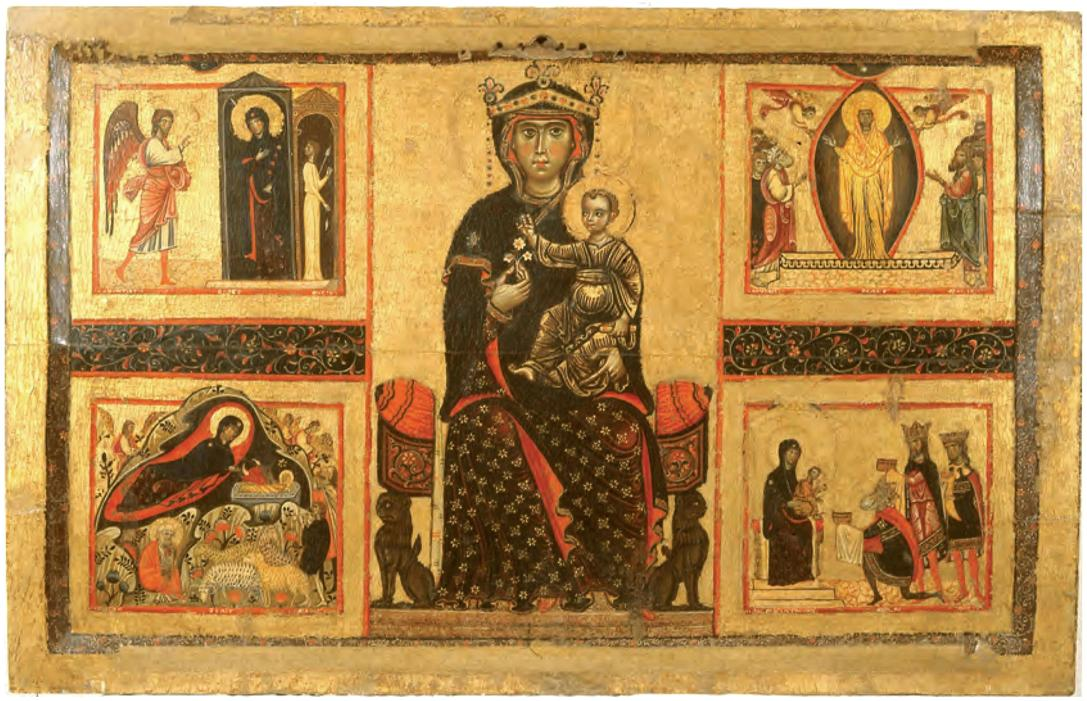
The panel realized by Margaritone and Restoro d'Arezzo for the Sanctuary

In the early 15th century, the sanctuary was rebuilt and expanded considerably and a formal monastery was established, complete with an abbot, a prior, a chamberlain and a sacristan. At the start of the 16th century, a portico was built alongside the church to shelter pilgrims from the weather, and the interior was renovated.

The care of the sanctuary was entrusted to the Order of Friars Minor in 1816. In 1943, Father Raffaello Franci, an architect, oversaw the renovation of the church, restoring several of its original Renaissance features. In 1964, Pope Paul VI named the Madonna delle Vertighe the patroness of the Autostrada A1 (the "Autostrada del Sole").

== Description ==
The sanctuary's plain plaster façade features a large oculus near the top. The building is bordered by a 16th-century portico with hexagonal brick pillars. The bell tower, dating to the early 16th century, is attributed to Andrea Sansovino. The ìbuilding has a three-aisled basilica plan and the interior is divided into three naves by columns topped with Ionic capitals. The central nave is covered by a trussed roof.

Lorenzo Monaco's Crucifix. From Marvin Eisenberg, Lorenzo Monaco, Princeton University Press, 1989

The sanctuary houses numerous works of art. The right nave is adorned with a fresco depicting the Nativity of the Virgin, painted in 1627 by Bernardino Santini, a follower of the Mannerist painter Matteo Rosselli. In the left nave stands a crucifix painted by Lorenzo Monaco on both the front and back, dating to between 1415 and 1420. According to Marvin Eisenberg, the Crucifix in Santa Maria delle Vertighe is "the most beautiful of Don Lorenzo's cutout crosses, where the spiritual and corporeal burden of the "Christus Patiens" is lightened by the rhythmic flow of contour and the buoyant arabesque of the loincloth." The left nave is decorated by a fresco by Orazio Porta depicting the Assumption of the Virgin (1590). The altarpiece is a diptych featuring Saints Savinus and Romuald painted by Ridolfo Ghirlandaio in 1520 and praised by Vasari in his Lives of The Artists.

== Bibliography ==
- Giulietti, Renato (2017). "Monte San Savino". Valdichiana. Città di Castello: Icona. pp. 91–155. ISBN 978-8898633142.
