= Fantoni =

Fantoni is an Italian surname. Notable people with the surname include:

- Angelo Fantoni (1903–1992), Italian priest and exorcist
- Barry Fantoni (1940–2025), English writer, cartoonist, and jazz musician
- Cesare Fantoni (1905–1963), Italian actor
- Fulvio Fantoni (born 1963), Italian bridge player
- Otávio Fantoni (1907–1935), Brazilian-born Italian football player
- Sergio Fantoni (1930–2020), Italian actor
- Stefano Fantoni (born 1945), Italian theoretical physicist
- Silvia Filippini-Fantoni (born 1974), Italian US-based museum director
