= Viareggio Insurrection =

The Viareggio Insurrection was an uprising against the French in Viareggio on 4-7 May 1799, part of the wider insurgency in Tuscany better known as the "Viva Maria".

The town had been occupied by French troops on 6 January 1799 - they formed a provisional government to replace that of the Republic of Lucca, including Francesco Belluomini and some other inhabitants of the town. While the ruling class in the city was strongly pro-Jacobin, the inhabitants of the neighbouring villages were hostile towards Jacobinism and the invader alike.

== Course ==
On the nights between 2 and 3 May fires were lit in the hill and mountain villages between Tuscany and Liguria, with similar fires lit in reply in the Lucca Plain, Versilia and Lunigiana. This was the signal agreed upon by the anti-French insurgents, hoping to free themselves from the invader by taking advantage of the first defeats suffered by Napoleon's troops.

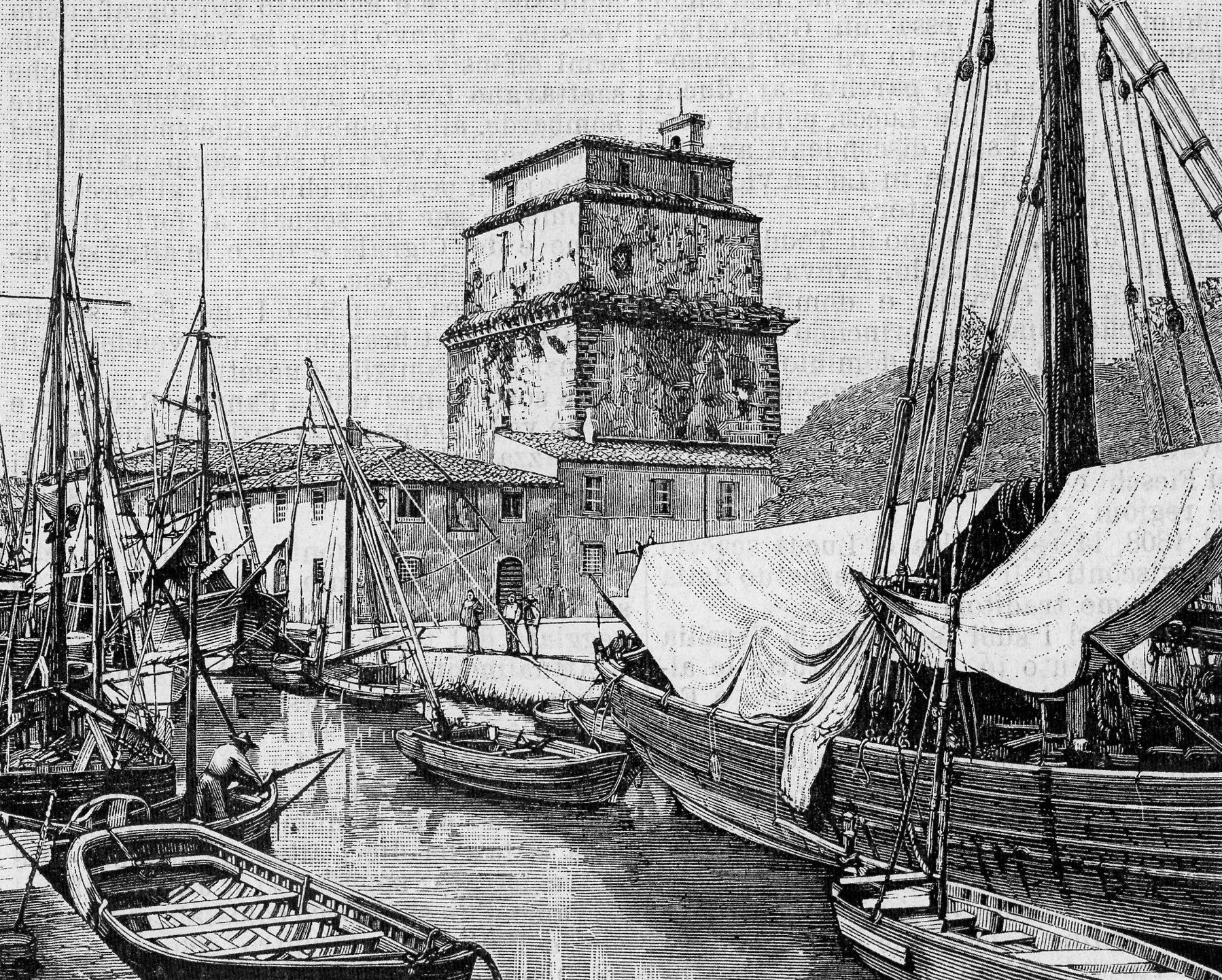
The Torre Matilde.

At dawn on 4 May the bell of the Torre Matilde began ringing to summon the people to revolt. The insurgents were organised by Sebastiano Motroni, an ex-nobleman from Lucca who had the support of the clergy and the most conservative political faction. They gathered with weapons, shouted "Viva Maria!", replaced the Tree of Liberty (put up in Piazza delle Erbe on 2 April) with a wooden cross, burned the French flags, disarmed the town's garrison and put the flag of the Republic of Lucca back up on the Torre Matilde.

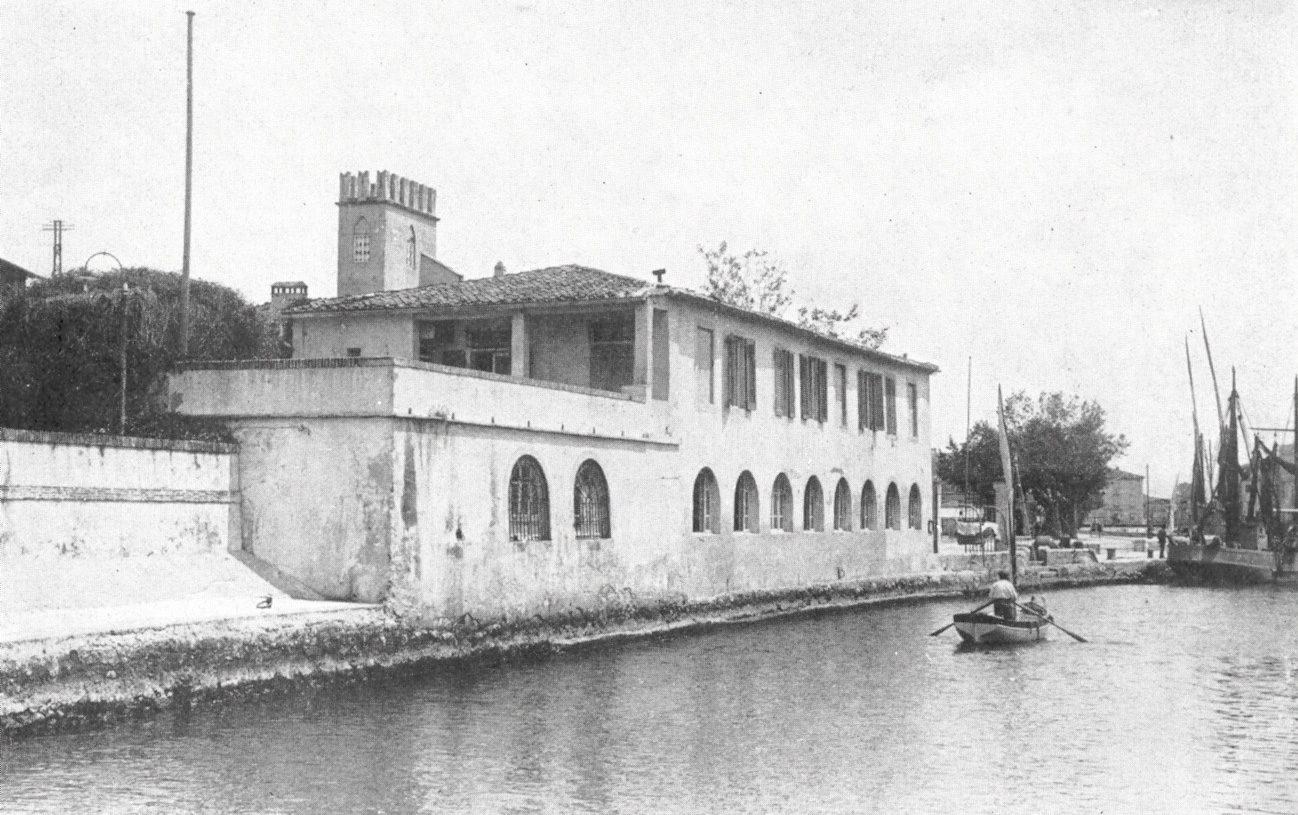
The Fortino sulla Foce di Viareggio

Some troops managed to barricade themselves in the Fortino di Levante, while pro-Jacobin citizens were hunted through the town, with at least one lynching and many fleeing their shops and homes for Pietrasanta, leaving them to be looted. On 5 May the insurgents laid siege to the Fortino sulla Foce and eventually captured it after the troops inside hastily fled. Looting continued all night, as did the lighting of bonfires and celebrations.

On 6 May more insurgents arrived from Camaiore and other neighbouring towns. They looted the warehouses at the Dogana and a group of insurgents went to Pietrasanta to foment a rebellion there and to continue hunting down Jacobins, who had to move on to Massa. Commissioner Ottavio Boccella was arrested and one of the leading insurgents, Sebastiano Belli, nicknamed "Il Morino", was made commander in chief with a "Sagrone" as his lieutenant general.

The cannon taken from the fleeing troops were placed to defend the main roads towards Pisa and Lucca, while the via di Montramito was guarded by armed patrols, successfully halting advancing troops sent from Lucca. Belli attacked and burned Palazzo Belluomini

Archbishop Filippo Sardi was then sent to negotiate with the insurgents, but even this negotiation was unsuccessful. In fact, the prelate was told that the people wanted to "free the homeland from foreigners and tyrants". However, he did recommend that the French Directory issue a general pardon to the people to calm the uprising, and he himself reported to the French the request for moderation and to spare the city from devastation..

Royal Navy ships were then off Viareggio and there were also signs of protests in Lucca and other towns, all of which forced the French to take action.. On 8 May general Sextius Alexandre François de Miollis ordered a column of 600 men and 50 mounted dragoons from Pisa in an attempt to retake the town. Further reinforcements also marched from Lucca and Massa and other troops headed for the nearby town of Camaiore.

Aware that they could no longer resist, the insurgents sent two representatives to negotiate a bloodless surrender in exchange for an amnesty. The French commander agreed, but once he had occupied the city, he broke his word, arresting the leaders of the revolt and sending them to prison in Livorno. Some of them - five according to some sources, two according to others — were executed. Luigi Sodini and Nello Loveri di Stiava were among those who received the death penalty, while Sebastiano Belli was pardoned. On May 9, the city's pro-French government was re-formed. Its first act was to remove the bell that had called for the revolt from the top of the Torre Matilde Tower.

== Bibliography (in Italian) ==
- Francesco Berganmini (1995). Le mille e una notizia di viata viareggina 1169/1940. Pezzini Editore. ISBN 9788888522814.
- Francesco Bergamini (1985). Istituto Storico Lucchese (ed.). Viva Maria! : la rivolta antigiacobina a Viareggio del maggio 1799 (PDF). Studi versiliesi. Vol. 3. pp. 29–46.
- Giorgio Tori (2000). Ministero della cultura (ed.). Lucca giacobina. Primo governo democratico della Repubblica lucchese (1799) (PDF). Pubblicazioni degli Archivi di Stato.
- Gabriele Levantini. "E Viareggio gridò Viva Maria". Welcome2Lucca.
