= Giulio Salvadori =

Italian poet

Giulio Salvadori (Italian pronunciation: [ˈdʒuːljo salvaˈdoːri]; 14 September 1862 in Monte San Savino, Tuscany – 7 October 1928 in Rome, Lazio) was an Italian poet, literary critic and educator.

== Life ==
Salvadori was educated at the Sapienza University of Rome, where he became a friend of Gabriele d'Annunzio. In 1885, he converted to Roman Catholicism, leading to a parting of the ways from d'Annunzio.

Salvadori first taught in high schools, then became an assistant professor at the University of Rome. He was never a full professor there, which was perhaps due to the fact that the state authorities made such appointments and were strongly anticlerical and reluctant to appoint intellectual Christians.

In 1923, Father Agostino Gemelli, the new Chancellor of the Catholic University of Milan, persuaded Salvadori to join him there, where he was appointed Professor of Italian Language and Literature and went on to become Dean of the Humanities faculty. In 1928, he returned to Rome as chairman of the Final Examinations Committee, but died suddenly on 7 October. He was entombed in the church of Santa Maria in Aracoeli on the Capitoline Hill.

Pope Pius X entrusted Salvadori with the revision of the Catechism in Italian.

As a poet, his principle works include Minime (1882), Il Canzoniere civile (1889, or The Civil Songbook), and Ricordi dell'Umile Italia (1918, Remember Poor Italy).
