= Enrico Narducci =

Italian librarian, bibliographer and paleographer

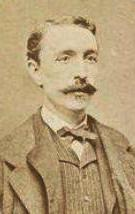
- Enrico Narducci
- Born: November 12, 1832; Rome, Papal States
- Died: 11 April 1893 (aged 60); Rome, Kingdom of Italy
- Occupations: librarian; bibliographer; paleographer
- Known for: editio princeps of the treatise of Restoro d'Arezzo La composizione del mondo colle sue cascioni
- Parent(s): Domenico Antonio Narducci and Enrichetta Narducci (née Fioroni)

Academic background
- Education: Roman College
- Influences: Baldassarre Boncompagni

Signature
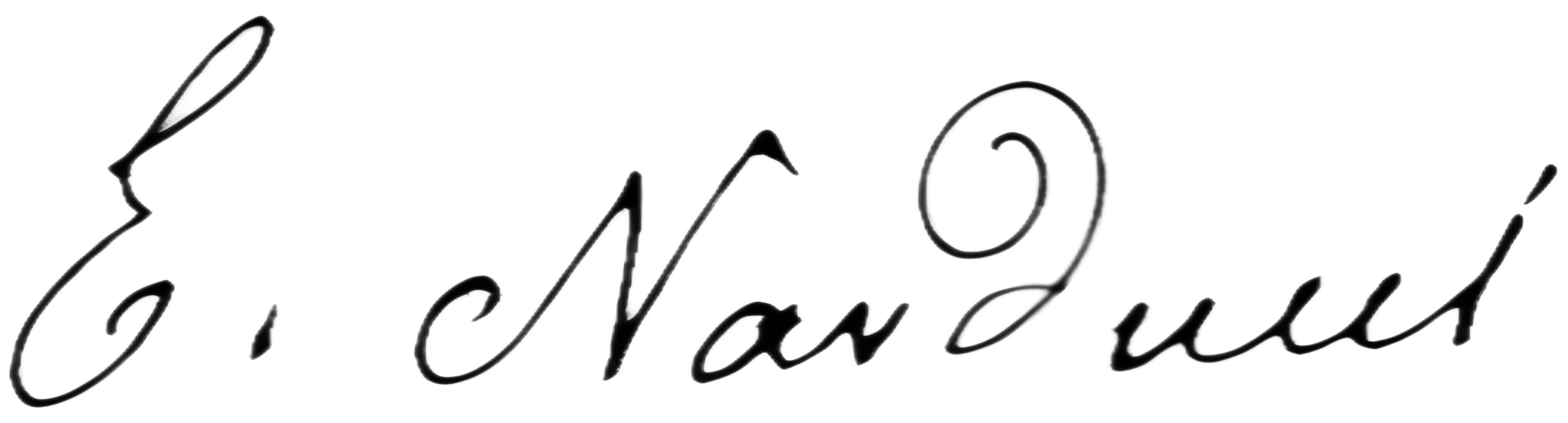

Enrico Narducci (12 November 1832 – 11 April 1893) was an Italian librarian, bibliographer and paleographer.

== Biography ==
Enrico Narducci was born on November 12, 1832, in Rome. He studied at the Roman College and, in 1848, he became an infantry officer of the Roman Republic. His cousin Paolo was one of the first to be injured during the French attack of April 30, 1849.

After the reinstallment of the papal government, he came into contact with Baldassarre Boncompagni, a Roman prince, mathematician and historian of science, who entrusted him with the care of his library and introduced him to the study of paleography.

In the 1860s, he published in the monthly review Il Buonarroti the Discorso del modo di formare un catalogo universale delle biblioteche d'Italia. In 1867, Narducci published the work "Giunte all'opera Gli scrittori d'Italia" (letters A and B l) by Count Giammaria Mazzucchelli.

After the end of the papal government, he was entrusted with the management of the libraries of Rome. He proposed that all the Italian state libraries should have had a combined catalogue. To prove its possibility he compiled an article on Boccaccio, and showed at one view all the editions of that writer and the place where they are to be found.

Narducci was also known as an editor of medieval philosophical writings. In 1859 he published the editio princeps of the treatise of Restoro d'Arezzo La composizione del mondo colle sue cascioni. In 1884 he published an edition of the first two parts of the Tractatus sphere of Bartholomew of Parma from the manuscript, Rome, Biblioteca Vittorio Emanuele (now Biblioteca Nazionale Centrale), Santa Croce, no. 228.

He died in Rome on April 11, 1893. He was a member of the Royal Academy of Sciences of Turin, of the Italian Geographical Society and of the Accademia Galileiana of Padua.

== Works ==
- Saggio di voci italiane derivate dall'arabo. Rome: Tipografia delle scienze matematiche e fisiche. 1858.
- Secondo saggio di voci italiane derivate dall'arabo. Rome: Tipografia delle belle arti. 1863.
- Intorno a due edizioni della Summa de arithmetica di fra Luca Pacioli. Rome: Tipografia delle scienze matematiche e fisiche. 1863.
- Intorno alla vita ed agli scritti dell'avvocato Gustavo Camillo Galletti. Rome: Tipografia delle scienze matematiche e fisiche. 1868.
- Notizie della Biblioteca Alessandrina nella R. Università di Roma. Rome: Tipografia delle Scienze matematiche e fisiche. 1872.
- Li nuptiali di Marco Antonio Altieri... Rome: Tipografia romana di c. Bartoli. 1873.
- Catalogo dei codici Petrarcheschi delle biblioteche Barberina, Chigiana, Corsiniana, Vallicelliana e Vaticana e delle edizioni Petrarchesche esistenti nelle biblioteche pubbliche di Roma. Rome: E. Loescher. 1874.

== Bibliography ==
- Solimine, Giovanni (1994). "Enrico Narducci e le biblioteche nei primi decenni dell'Italia unita". Nuovi Annali della Scuola Speciale per Archivisti e Bibliotecari. VIII: 195–218.
- Cerri, Maria Giuseppina (2012). "NARDUCCI, Enrico". Dizionario Biografico degli Italiani (in Italian). Vol. 77: Morlini–Natolini. Rome: Istituto dell'Enciclopedia Italiana. ISBN 978-88-12-00032-6.
