= Artephius =

Ancient Alchemist

Artephius (or Artefius) (c. 1150) is a writer to whom a number of alchemical texts are ascribed. Although the roots of the texts are unclear and the identity of their author obscure, at least some of them are Arabic in origin. He is named as the author of several books, the Ars sintrillia, Clavis sapientiae or Clavis maioris sapientiae, and Liber secretus.

== Confusion over identity ==
Alchemical pseudepigraphy makes it difficult to identify who the historical Artephius may have been. His identity remains an open question. As The Secret Book of Artephius was respected and mentioned by Roger Bacon many times, Artephius’ writing is dated to around 1150. One author, Restoro d'Arezzo, conflated Orpheus with Artephius in his Composizione del Mondo in 1282. This mistake was due to a translation error, with the Arabic for Orpheus and Artephius being very similar. This transcription error gave us "Artephius", an alchemist without a historical personality.

Artephius has also been misidentified as a Jewish convert, Apollonius of Tyana, Stephanos of Alexandria, Al-Tughrai, and Ibn Umail. The discovery of a 13/14th-century copy of Clavis Sapientia confirms that the text was first written in Arabic by a Muslim author.

== Legacy ==
A Renaissance tradition held that Artephius had been born in the first or second century and died in the twelfth, thanks to having discovered the alchemical elixir that made it possible to prolong life. In his Secret Book, Artephius indeed claims to be more than a thousand years old.

In printed form, works attributed to Artephius became well known in the seventeenth century. A work Artefii clavis majoris sapientiae was printed in Paris in 1609. Later it would also appear within Volume IV of Theatrum Chemicum, printed originally in 1613. Then in 1624, Eirenaeus Orandus provided an English translation of the 'secret booke'. The Latin editions of Clavis Sapentia are highly abridged and lack the original diagrams found in the Arabic text.

== Sources ==
- Austin, H.D. 1937. "Artephius-Orpheus." Speculum 12: 251–54.
- Levi della Vida, G. 1938. "Something More about Artefius and His Clavis Sapientiae." Speculum 13: 80–85.
