= Angelo Fantoni =

Italian priest and exorcist

Father Angelo Fantoni (May 2, 1903 – August 28, 1992) was an Italian priest and exorcist who worked at Monte San Savino near Arezzo, Italy.

He was born in Italy to Pietro Annunziata (Cipriani) Fantoni. He entered college at the age of seventeen in 1920 and was ordained a priest on March 18, 1930.

Father Fantoni became a noted faith healer but this ended up causing problems in Arezzo when the medical doctors collectively denounced him as a fraud because he healed without using medicine. Father Fantoni was to be imprisoned for a year and pay a 300,000 lire fine. However, when the verdict was appealed he was acquitted. The story is told in the 1999 book Thanks, don Angelo! by Franco Predieri.

His life and experiences as an exorcist are recorded in the book Don Angelo Fantoni: Testimonianze by Rita Buonomo.

He is mentioned in Father Gabriele Amorth's book An Exorcist: More Stories.

== Sources ==
- A Parish Priest to Remember
