= Restoro d'Arezzo =

Italian monk and scientist of the Middle Ages

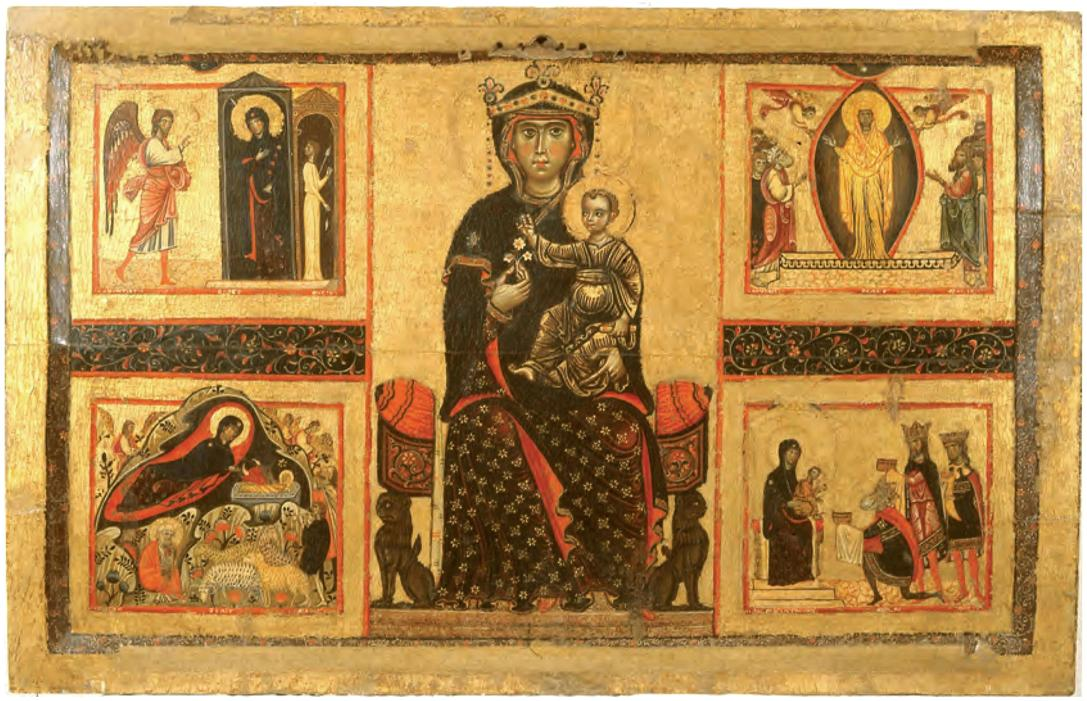
- Madonna and child with four scenes from the life of the Virgin, altarpiece for Santa Maria delle Vertighe, signed by Margarito and Restoro d'Arezzo
- Born: Arezzo, Italy
- Died: Arezzo, Italy
- Occupations: Christian monk; Natural philosopher; Painter
- Known for: La composizione del mondo colle sue cascioni

Restoro d'Arezzo (also spelled Ristoro) was an Italian monk, scientist and artist of the Middle Ages, author of an important prose treatise in the vernacular, La composizione del mondo colle sue cascioni. The Italian scholar Enrico Narducci calls him the 'Humboldt' of the thirteenth century.

== Life ==
Restoro was born in Arezzo, Tuscany, at an unknown date in the first decades of the thirteenth century. Very little is known about his life. He himself states that he wrote his book in a convent at Arezzo; that he was an artist and a painter of miniatures, and that he lived in the second half of the thirteenth century. In 1274, together with Margaritone d'Arezzo, he created a tempera and gold-leaf altarpiece depicting the Virgin and Child enthroned with four scenes from the life of the Virgin for the Sanctuary of Santa Maria delle Vertighe.

== Works ==
Illuminated manuscript of Ristoro D'Arezzo's Della composizione del mondo colle sue cascioni, Florence, Biblioteca Riccardiana, Ms. Ricc. 2164 - f. 1r

In 1282, Restoro completed an elaborate treatise on cosmography, Della composizione del mondo colle sue cascioni [The composition of the world with its causes]. It was the first scientific treatise to be written in an Italian vernacular (Arezzo dialect). Ristoro gives an exhaustive account of the Aristotelian science that was taught in the Universities at that time. He deals with Astronomy and Astrology (which are one-and-the-same for Restoro, as indeed they were for most people at that time), Meteorology, Geography and Natural History (together with numerous observations in merit which derive from the areas around Arezzo and Siena), drawing widely on Aristotle and Ptolemy, on Arab texts and Medieval authors, including for example Albertus Magnus and Johannes de Sacrobosco. Restoro discusses also the structure of the world and develops some sound geological theories despite his strong leanings toward astrology. Writing on the origin of mountains, for example, while he attributed the elevation of dry land above the sea to attraction by the stars, he also recognised other influences, such as water erosion, sea waves throwing up sand and gravel, subsequent floods depositing sediment, earthquakes, calcareous deposits from certain waters, and the activities of man. Following the view of Empedocles, he maintained that the Earth had a molten centre and that volcanoes erupted through the rise of molten rock to the surface. Skilled in drawing and painting, Ristoro displayed a keen interest in ancient arts and culture; he dedicated a chapter of his massive work to ancient Etruscan and Roman ware discovered in his native city, showing refined appreciation of their depiction of the natural world at a time when others did not value archaeological remains.

Restoro's knowledge derived in part from Latin translations of Arabic writings of the first half of the ninth century. He used Al-Farghani and Sahl ibn Bishr, probably also Abu Ma'shar al-Balkhi and Artephius. He also knew well Aristotle's De coelo et mundo and De meteoris and Isidore of Seville's Etymologiae. He may have had some slight contact with Avicenna's Qānūn, and with Averroes' commentary on Aristotelian meteorology. Ristoro recommended avoidance of resorting to miracles in explaining natural phenomena, echoing both William of Conches and Albertus Magnus.

The greater part of Restoro's work is the result of his own scientific observations. These observations, well calculated and analysed in a pure and elaborated style, make the book much superior to all the other scientific treatises of the thirteenth century. His fine description of the total eclipse of the Sun on 3 June 1239 is one of the most detailed and precise accounts of a solar eclipse before the eighteenth century.

Restoro's treatise remained unpublished until the nineteenth century. We know, however, that Leon Battista Alberti and Leonardo da Vinci were familiar with Ristoro's work. Dante's acquaintance with Restoro has not been definitely proved, but is regarded by competent authorities as highly probable. Paul of Venice's De compositione mundi is mostly an abridged translation into Latin of Restoro's Treatise.

== Bibliography ==
- Usher, J. (2002). "Restoro d'Arezzo". The Oxford Companion to Italian Literature. Oxford University Press.
- Matrod, H. (1905). "Le mouvement intellectuel dans un couvent italien au XIII^{e} siècle : fra Ristoro d'Arezzo". Études franciscaines. XIV: 453–68.
- Eastman, Charles R. (1907). "Illustrations of Medieval Earth-Science". Popular Science Monthly. 71: 84–91.
- Austin, Herbert Douglas (1912–13). "Accredited citations in Ristoro d'Arezzo's Composizione del mondo". Studi medievali. IV: 335–82.
- Debenedetti, Santorre (1936). "RISTORO d'Arezzo". Enciclopedia Italiana. Rome: Istituto dell'Enciclopedia Italiana.
- Rodolico, Francesco (1975). "Ristoro (Or Restoro) D'Arezzo". In Charles Coulston Gillispie (ed.). Dictionary of Scientific Biography. Vol. XI. New York: Charles Scribner's Sons. pp. 468–469.
- Stephenson, Richard (1984). "Astronomy in the monasteries". New Scientist: 27–31.
- Donato, Maria Monica (1996). "Un "savio depentore" fra "scienza de le stelle" e "sutilità" dell'antico. Restoro d'Arezzo, le arti e il sarcofago romano di Cortona". Annali della Scuola Normale Superiore di Pisa. 4: 51–78.
- Gregori, G.P.; Gregori, L.G. (1997). "Restoro d'Arezzo and Earth's sciences in the Middle Age". Geomagnetism and Aeronomy with Special Historical Case Studies. Interdivisional Commission on History, IAGA: 315–350. Bibcode:1997gash.conf..315G.
- Pesic, Peter (2005). Sky in a Bottle. Cambridge MA: MIT Press.
- Piciocco, Michele (2016). "RISTORO d'Arezzo". Dizionario Biografico degli Italiani (in Italian). Vol. 87: Renzi–Robortello. Rome: Institute of the Italian Encyclopaedia. ISBN 978-88-12-00032-6.
