= Margaritone d'Arezzo =

Italian painter

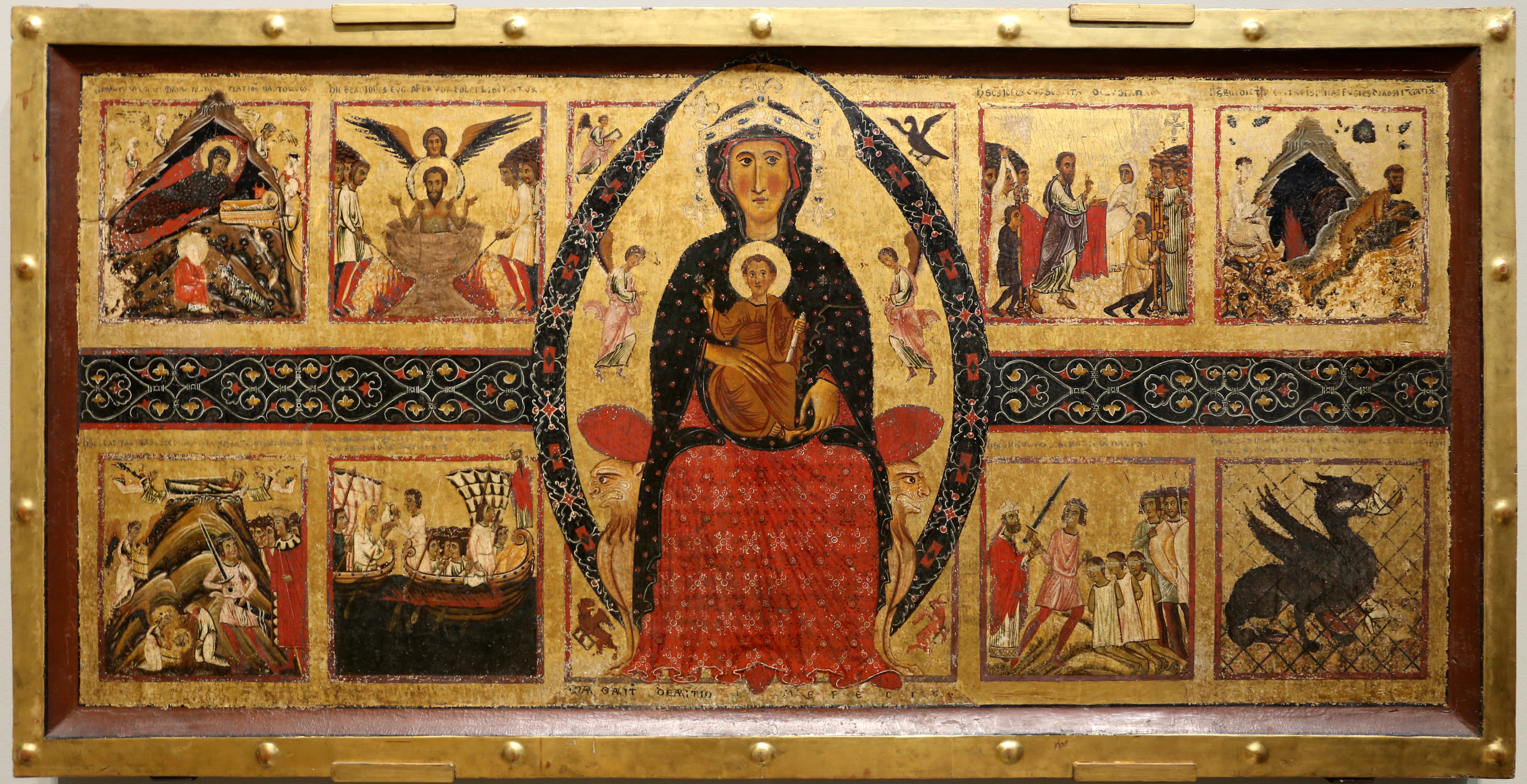
Altarpiece, c. 1263–64, National Gallery, London

Detail showing Margaritone's signature; it reads "MARGARIT___RITIO ME FECIT", (Washington).

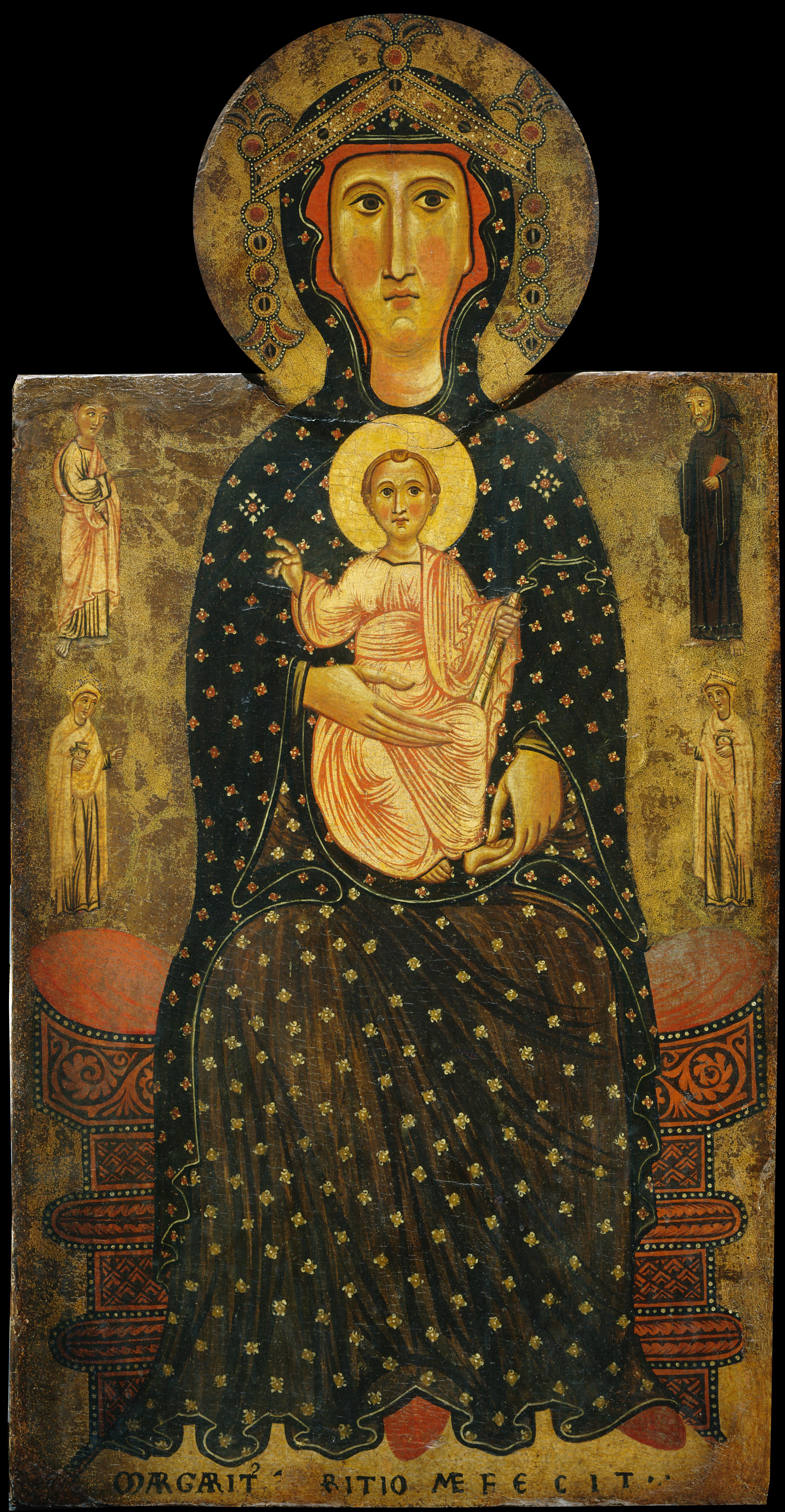
Margaritone d'Arezzo, Madonna and Child, c. 1270, National Gallery of Art

Margarito, Margaritone da Arezzo or Margaritone d'Arezzo (fl. c. 1250–1290) was an Italian painter from Arezzo, in Tuscany. Margaritone's given name was Margarito, but it was transcribed erroneously by Vasari as "Margaritone". It is by this latter form that he is still often known today.

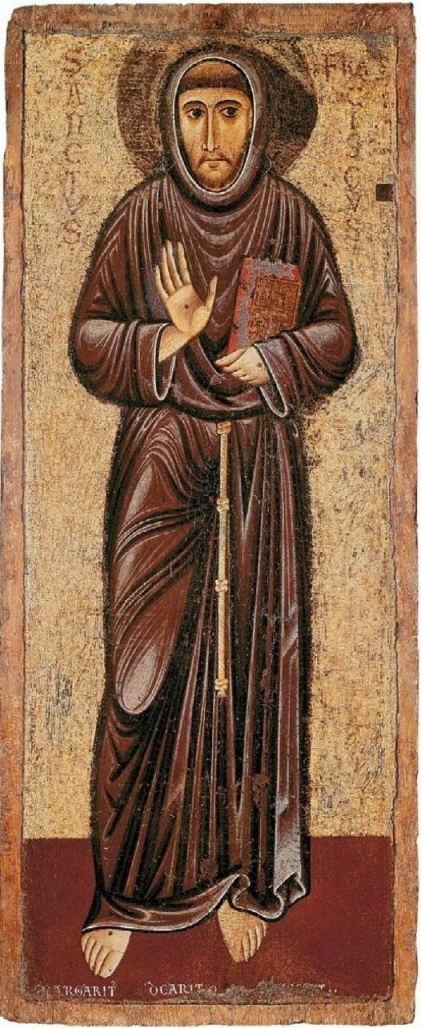
Margaritone d'Arezzo, Francis of Assisi

Little is known of Margaritone's life. The only documentary record of his existence dates from 1262, when he lived in Arezzo. However, a fair number of his works are known to survive. Unusually for the time, most are signed, but on the only one to be dated the date is "now fragmentary and variously read as 1269, 1274, and 1283". Given the lack of surviving dates, no chronology for his career has yet been created. The best documentary evidence suggests he was busy in the 1260s, but stylistically much of his work suggests dates before 1250. Towards the end of his career he collaborated with Ristoro of Arezzo, also a miniaturist.

The nature and distribution of surviving works indicate that Margaritone was much in demand as an artist, both in Arezzo and throughout Tuscany. Most of these are dossals, either of the Madonna and Child, some with smaller scenes to the sides, or of Saint Francis of Assisi. His treatment of the elements of these subjects is very consistent.

Unlike most contemporaries, he has a life in Giorgio Vasari's The Lives of the Artists. Vasari, also from Arezzo, "devotes a good deal of space to him as an early painter from his home town". However, much of Vasari's information seems to be wrong: there is no evidence he was also a sculptor, and a death in 1316 seems far too late.

== Style ==
Margaritone's style is distinctive, though with similarities to other Italo-Byzantine painters of the mid-century, such as the Master of the Bigallo Crucifix in Florence and Berlinghiero in Lucca. His work has at times been dismissed as either reactionary and provincial, partly because Vasari's life placed him several decades later than the probable real dates, making him seem more conservative than he actually was.

He was often held up by critics in the 19th century as a prime example of the barbarism perceived in Italo-Byzantine painting. According to one standard popular history in 1914, his London altarpiece "in spite of a certain swarthy splendour, is an impotent, nerveless, almost comic thing, retaining some refinement of line and pattern from the Roman-Byzantine models it copies, together with a proficiency in mere execution common to the tradition". The National Gallery's annual report for 1858 justified its purchase, as part of the Lombardi-Baldi collection, as serving "to show the barbarous state into which art had sunk even in Italy previously to its revival". It is the oldest painting in their collection.

The eight smaller scenes show scenes from the lives of saints John the Evangelist, Nicolas of Bari, with two each, and single ones of Catherine of Alexandria, Saint Benedict, Saint Margaret and a Nativity of Jesus. These presumably reflect the dedication of the church it was created for, as well as the patron saints of the donors, and perhaps the town.

Paintings by Margaritone are in the museums and churches of Arezzo and surrounding districts, as well as the National Gallery of Art in Washington, D.C., the Monte dei Paschi art collection in Siena, and the National Gallery, London.

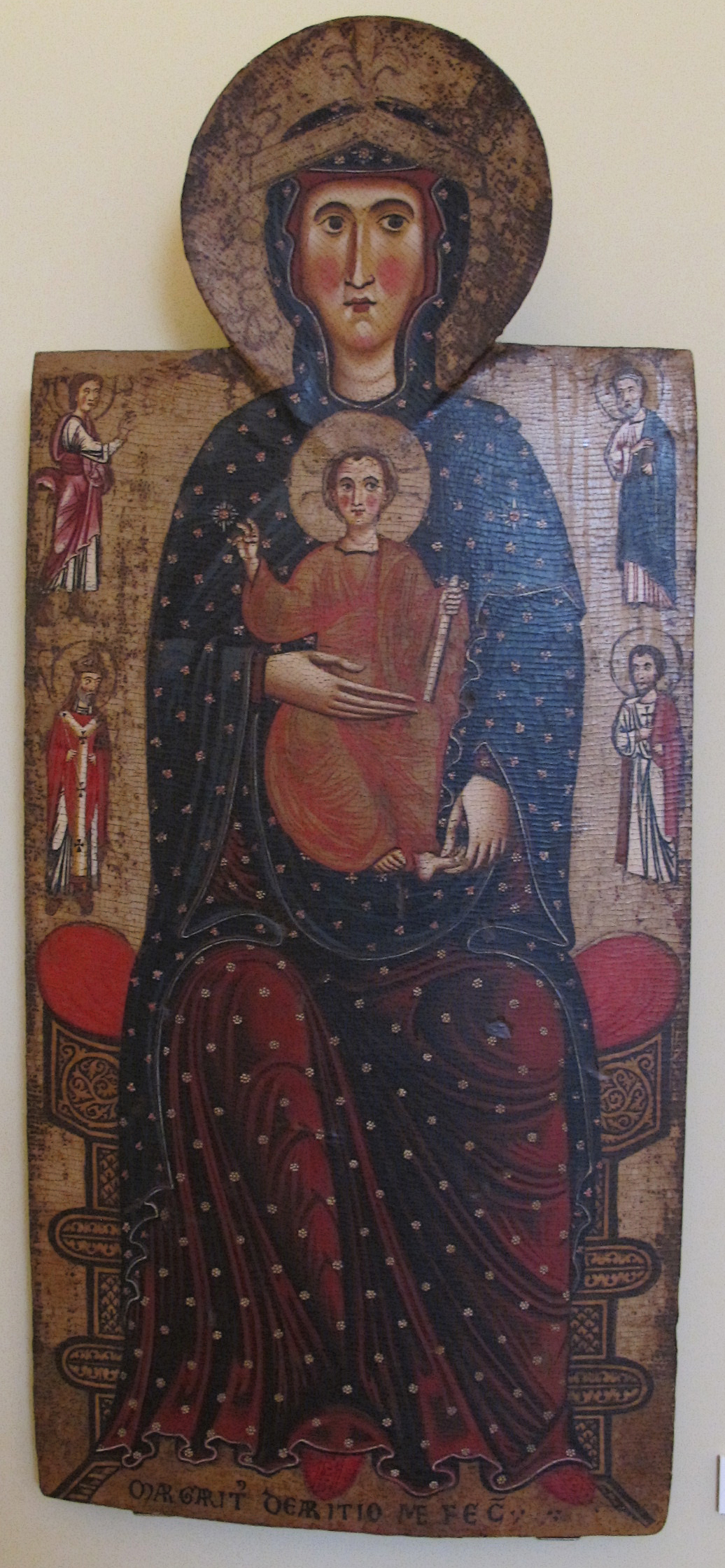
"Madonna di Montelungo", now Arezzo

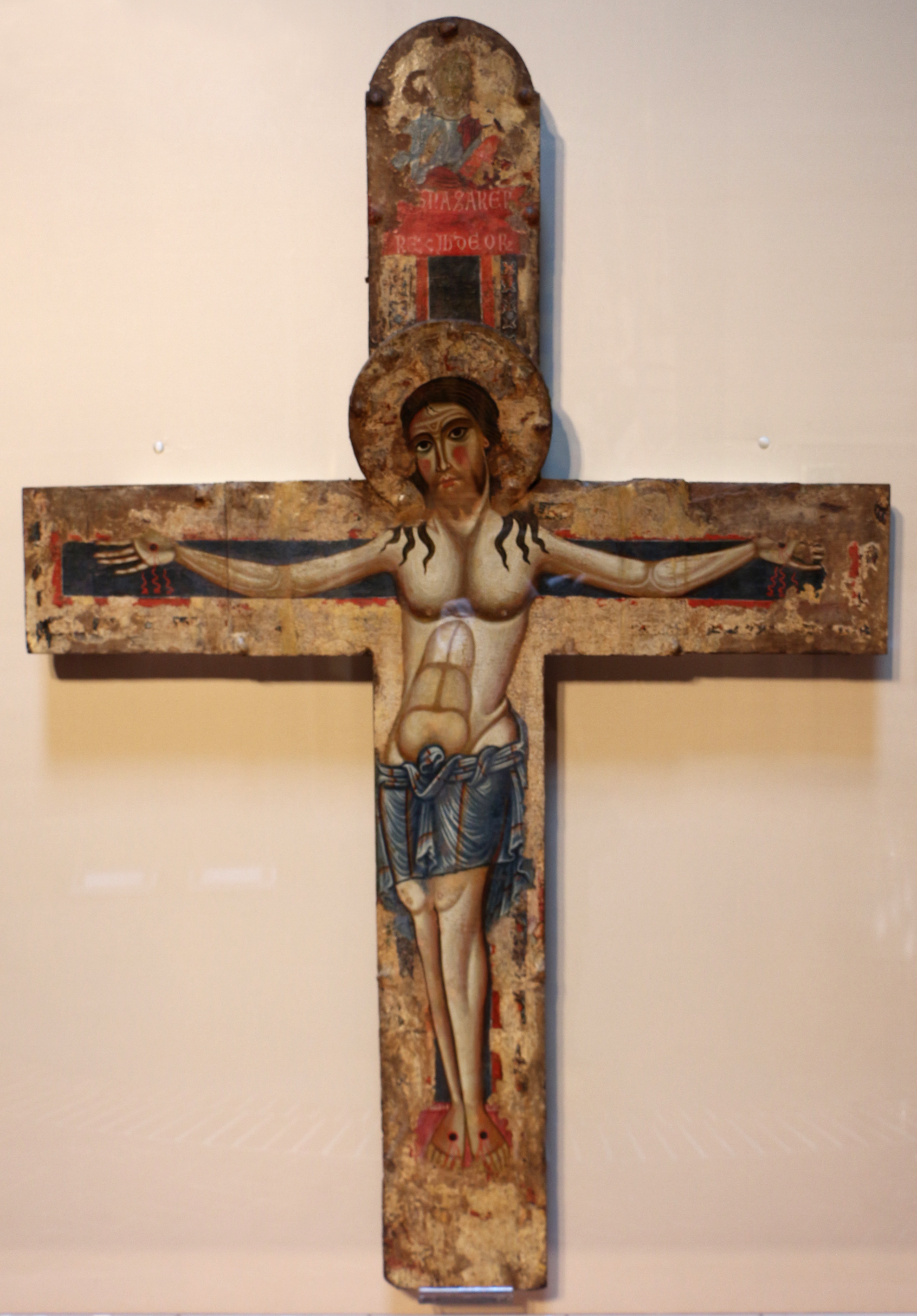
Crucifix, c. 1255, Monte dei Paschi collection, Siena

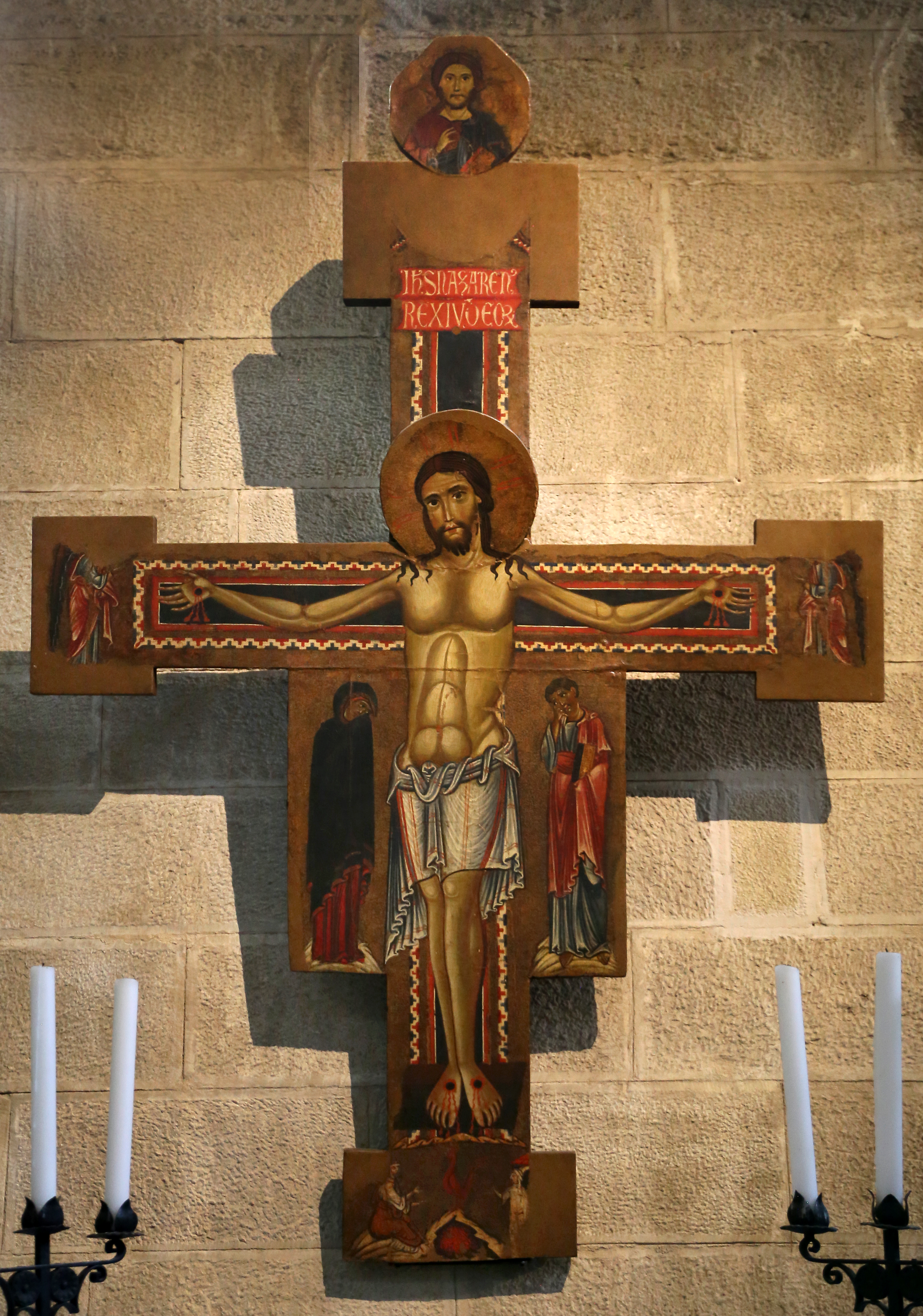
Santa Maria della Pieve church, Arezzo
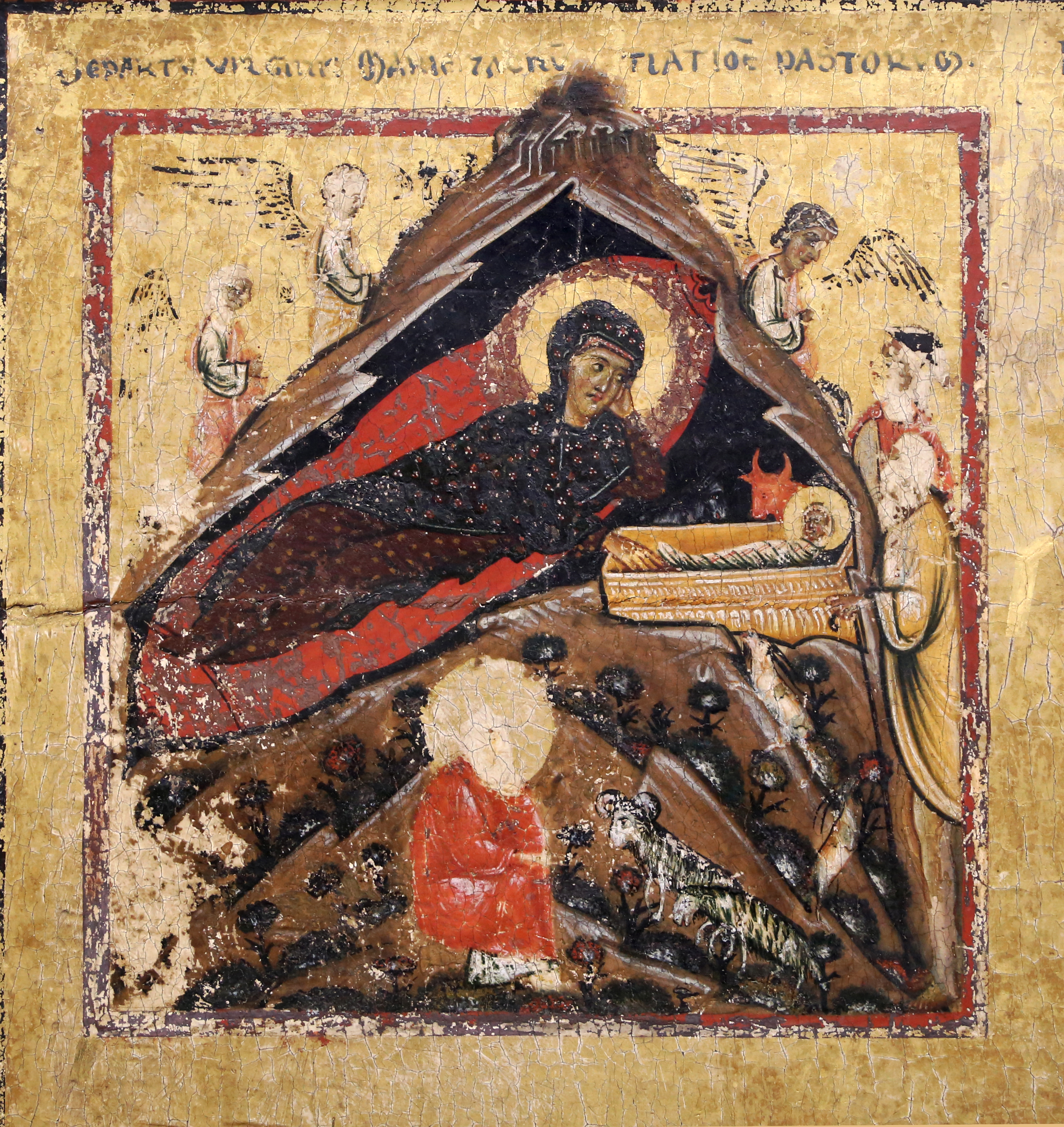
Nativity, 1263–64, from the London altarpiece

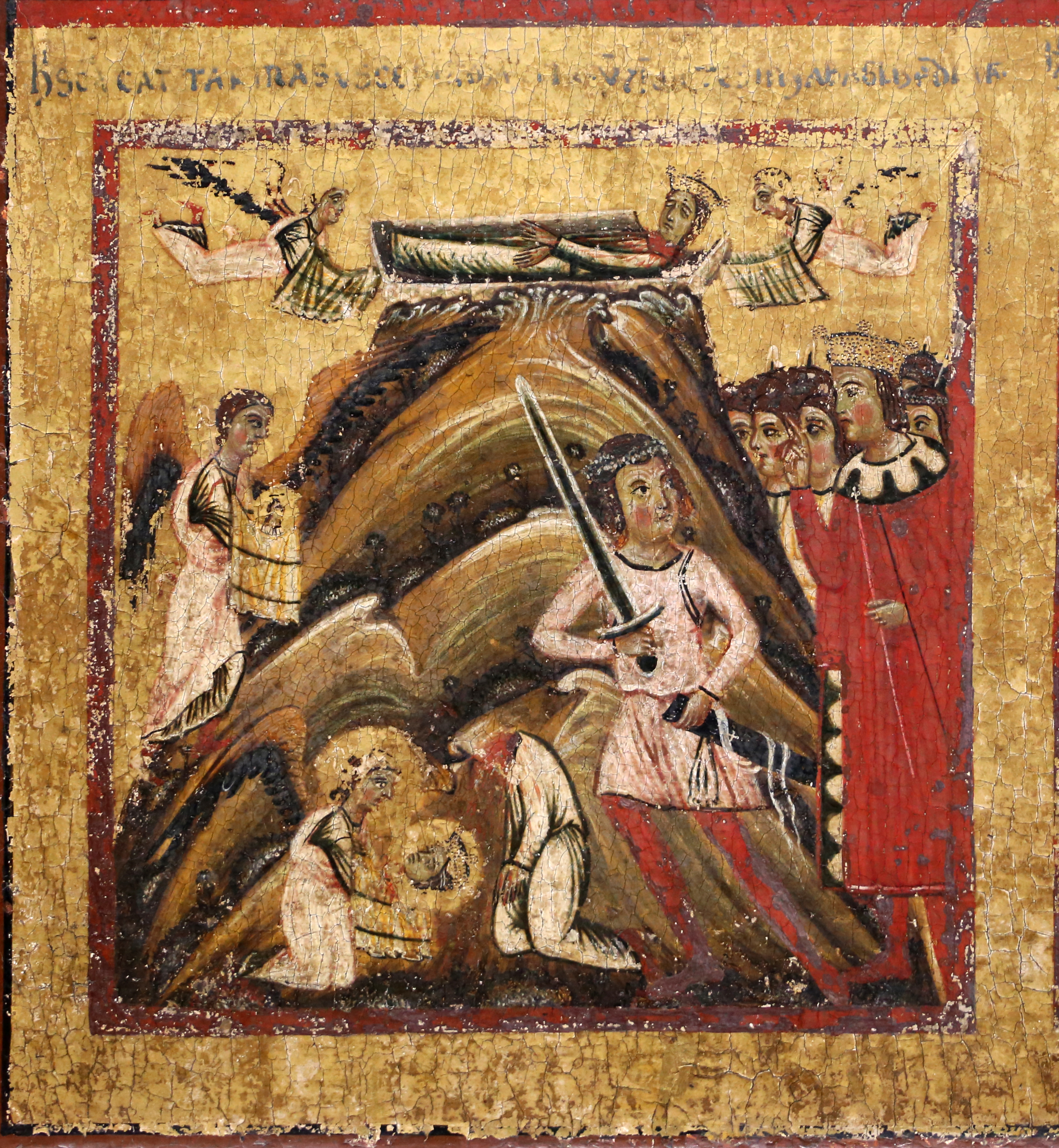
Martyrdom of Catherine of Alexandria, from the London altarpiece

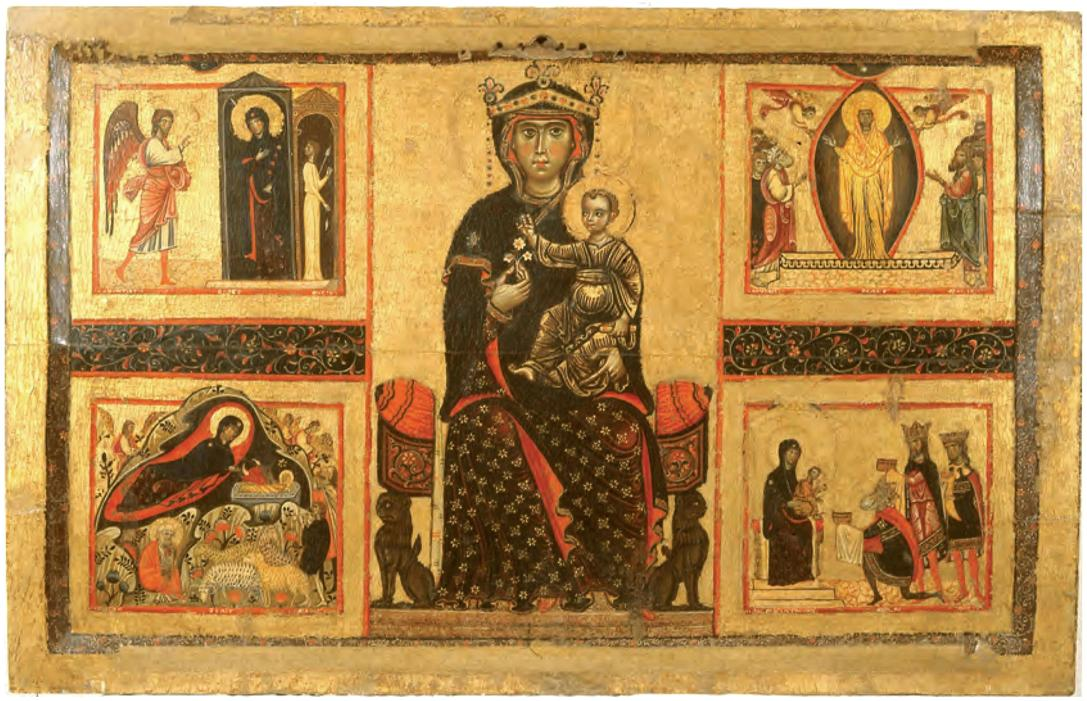
Altarpiece with scenes from the Life of the Virgin, also signed by Ristoro
