= Viva Maria (movement) =

The Viva Maria was one of the anti-French movements, known collectively as the Sanfedisti, which arose in Italy between 1799 and 1800; it was motivated as much by hunger amongst the peasants as by anti-French sentiment. It operated above all in the town of Arezzo and the rest of Tuscany, but also in the neighboring territories of the Papal States. Their rallying cry was the Marian hymn Evviva Maria from which they had their name.
