= List of municipalities of the Metropolitan City of Florence =

The following is a list of the 41 municipalities (comuni) of the Metropolitan City of Florence in the region of Tuscany in Italy.

== List ==
Municipality	Population (2026)	Area (km^{2})	Density
Bagno a Ripoli	24,806	74.10	334.8
Barberino di Mugello	10,981	133.29	82.4
Barberino Tavarnelle	11,983	123.01	97.4
Borgo San Lorenzo	18,412	146.37	125.8
Calenzano	18,008	76.97	234.0
Campi Bisenzio	47,435	28.75	1,649.9
Capraia e Limite	7,804	24.92	313.2
Castelfiorentino	17,488	66.44	263.2
Cerreto Guidi	10,659	49.32	216.1
Certaldo	15,731	75.28	209.0
Dicomano	5,610	61.63	91.0
Empoli	49,526	62.21	796.1
Fiesole	13,742	42.19	325.7
Figline e Incisa Valdarno	23,291	97.90	237.9
Firenzuola	4,444	271.99	16.3
Florence	361,625	102.32	3,534.3
Fucecchio	22,919	65.18	351.6
Gambassi Terme	4,872	83.15	58.6
Greve in Chianti	13,365	169.38	78.9
Impruneta	14,186	48.72	291.2
Lastra a Signa	19,880	42.90	463.4
Londa	1,848	59.29	31.2
Marradi	2,808	154.07	18.2
Montaione	3,433	104.76	32.8
Montelupo Fiorentino	14,272	24.67	578.5
Montespertoli	13,197	124.97	105.6
Palazzuolo sul Senio	1,095	109.11	10.0
Pelago	7,966	54.56	146.0
Pontassieve	20,122	114.40	175.9
Reggello	16,555	121.68	136.1
Rignano sull'Arno	8,511	54.14	157.2
Rufina	7,103	45.88	154.8
San Casciano in Val di Pesa	16,288	107.83	151.1
San Godenzo	1,115	99.21	11.2
Scandicci	49,135	59.70	823.0
Scarperia	11,943	115.81	103.1
Sesto Fiorentino	49,237	48.80	1,009.0
Signa	18,990	18.81	1,009.6
Vaglia	5,371	56.94	94.3
Vicchio	8,164	138.86	58.8
Vinci	14,574	54.19	268.9

== See also ==
- List of municipalities of Tuscany
- List of municipalities of Italy
