= Castagno d'Andrea =

Frazione in Italy

- Frazione
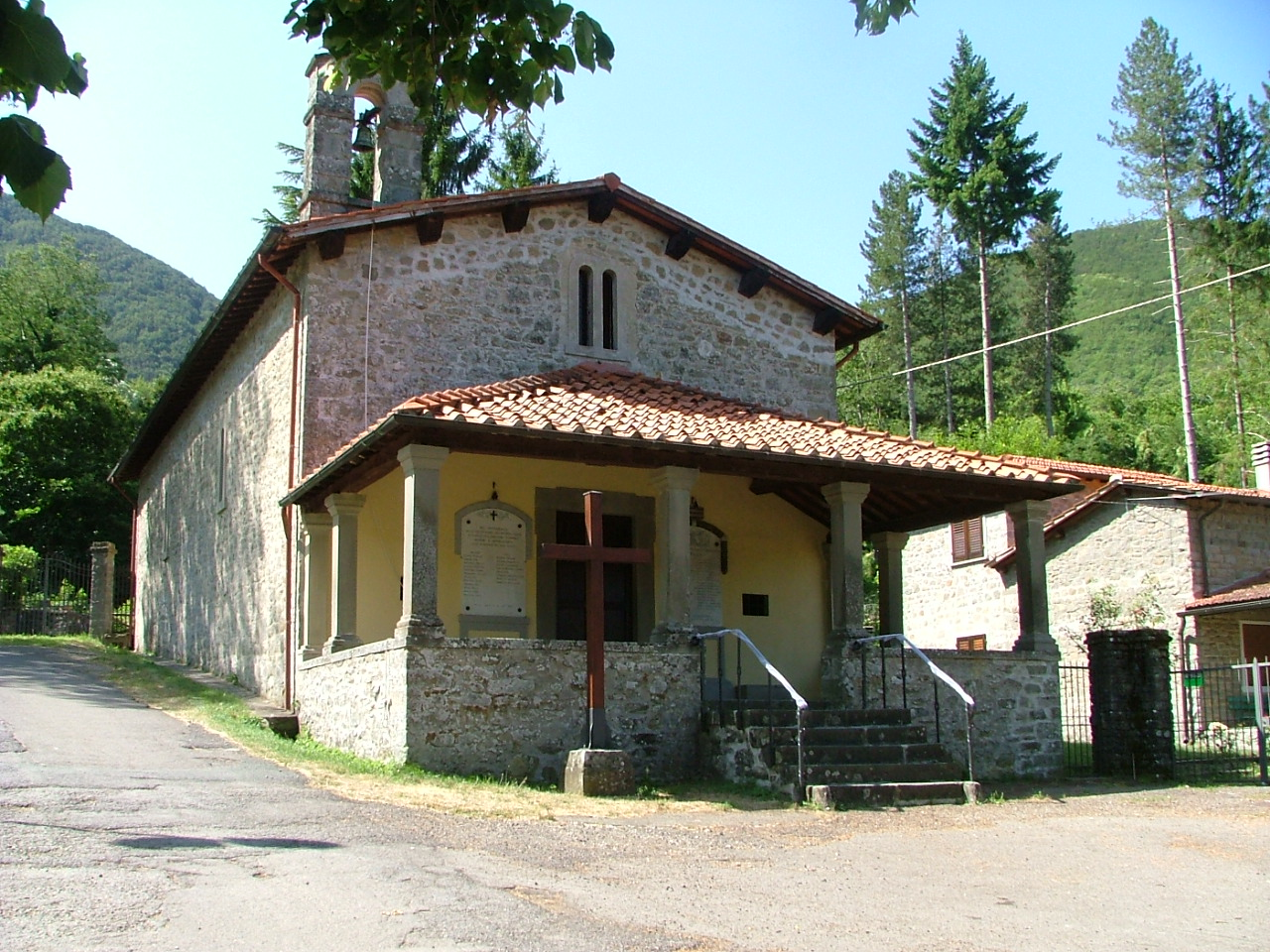
- The church

- Location of Castagno d'Andrea in Italy
- Coordinates: 43°53′45″N 11°39′37″E
- Country: Italy
- Region: Tuscany
- Province: Florence (FI)
- Comune: San Godenzo
- Elevation: 750 m (2,460 ft)

Population (2011)
  - Total: 253
- Time zone: UTC+1 (CET)
  - Summer (DST): UTC+2 (CEST)

Castagno d'Andrea is a frazione of the comune of San Godenzo, in the Metropolitan City of Florence, Tuscany (Italy). It is located within the Foreste Casentinesi, Monte Falterona, Campigna National Park.

It has only a single osteria, but many walking trails. Trekking over the Apennines to the national parks, the chestnut trees for which the village is named, the village osteria and a handful of bed and breakfast spots and bars, and the local church (Chiesa di San Martin) are the major tourist draws.

It was thought to be the birthplace of the painter Andrea del Castagno, although this has been disputed due to its location, "literally at the end of the road."
