= Borgo San Lorenzo =

- Comune
- Comune di Borgo San Lorenzo
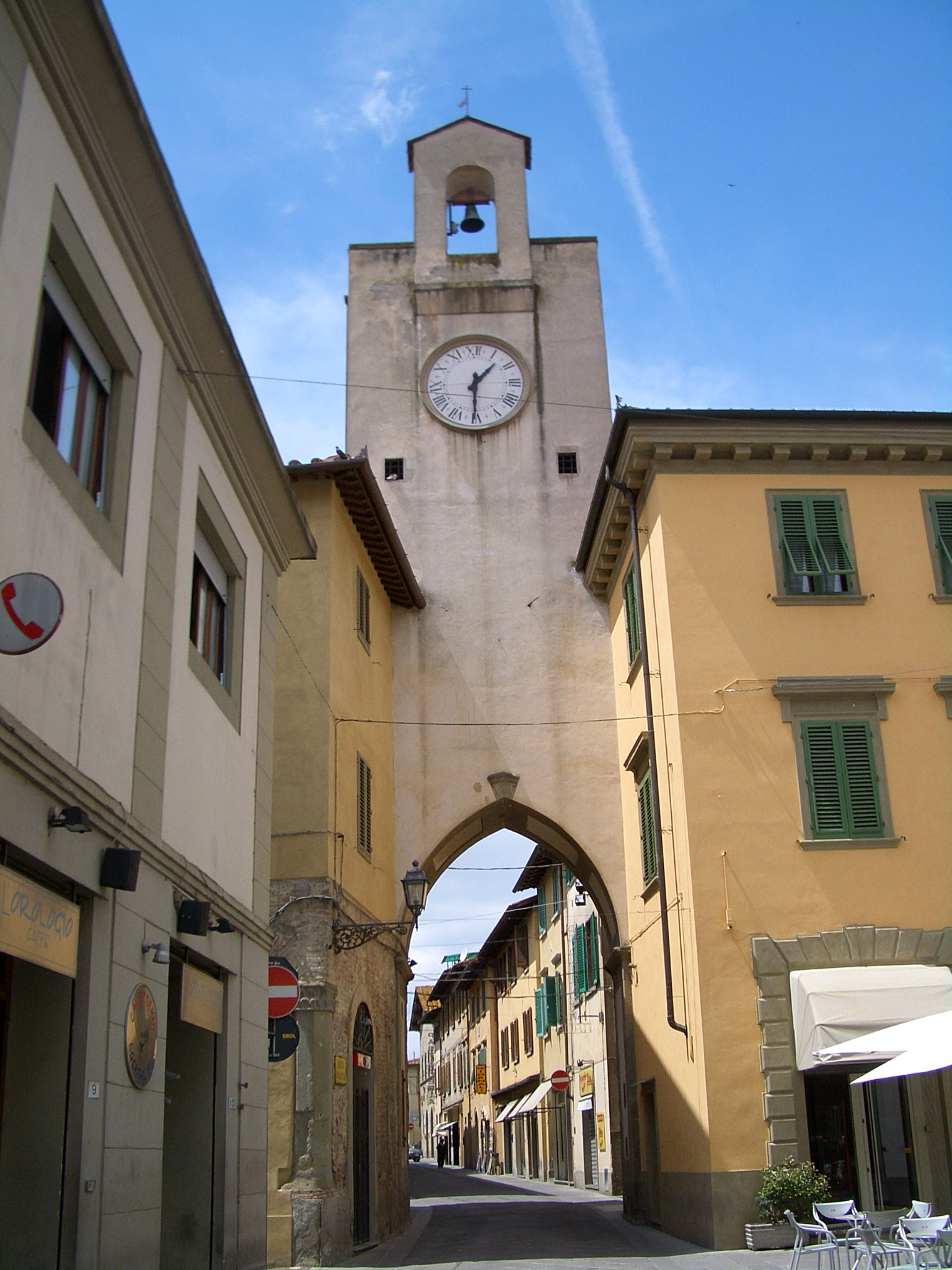

- Coat of arms

- Location within Italy Location within Tuscany
- Coordinates: 43°57′N 11°23′E
- Country: Italy
- Region: Tuscany
- Metropolitan city: Florence (FI)
- Frazioni: Casaglia, Grezzano, Gricignano, Luco di Mugello, Montepulico, Panicaglia, Polcanto, Rabatta, Razzolo, Ronta, Sagginale, Salaiole

Government
  - Mayor: Leonardo Romagnoli

Area
  - Total: 146 km^{2} (56 sq mi)
- Elevation: 193 m (633 ft)

Population (31 August 2007)
  - Total: 18,085
  - Density: 124/km^{2} (321/sq mi)
- Demonym: Borghigiani
- Time zone: UTC+1 (CET)
  - Summer (DST): UTC+2 (CEST)
- Postal code: 50032
- Dialing code: 055
- Patron saint: St. Lorenzo
- Saint day: August 10
- Website: Official website

Borgo San Lorenzo is a comune (municipality) in the Metropolitan City of Florence in the Italian region Tuscany, located about 20 kilometres (12 mi) northeast of Florence. As of 31 December 2004, it had a population of 18,085 and an area of 146.1 square kilometres (56.4 mi^{2}).

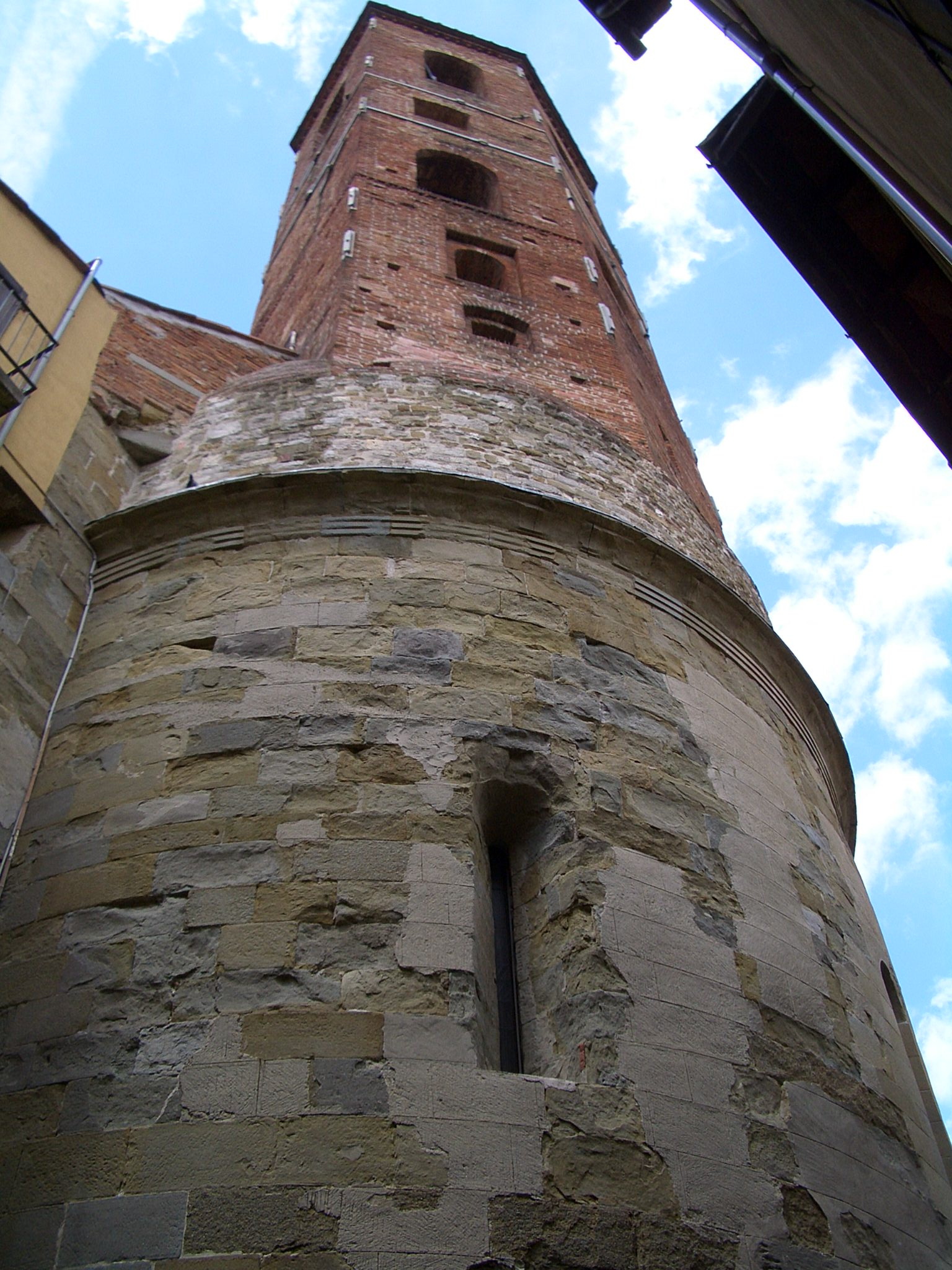
The church of San Lorenzo in Borgo San Lorenzo

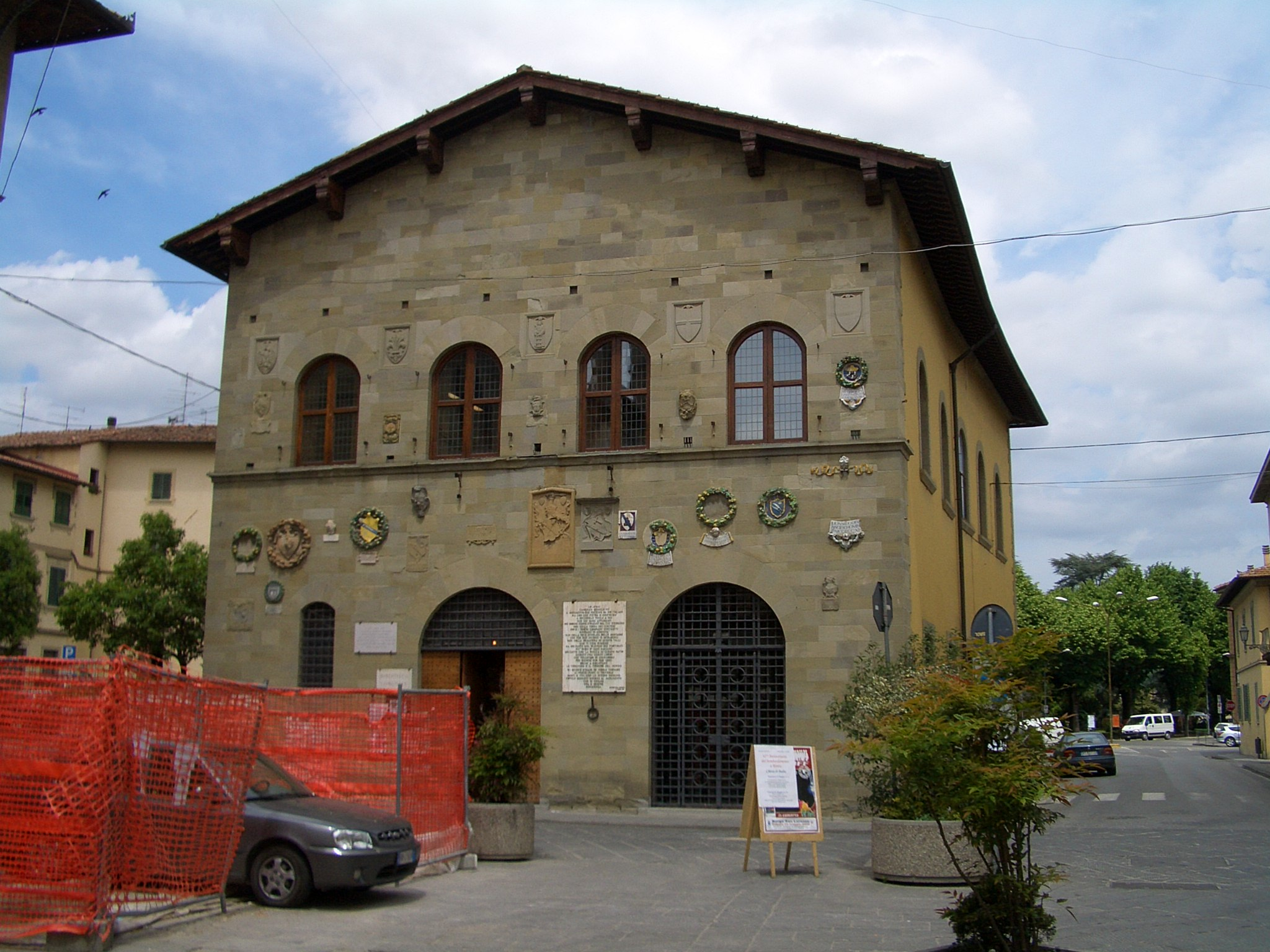
The public library of the comune

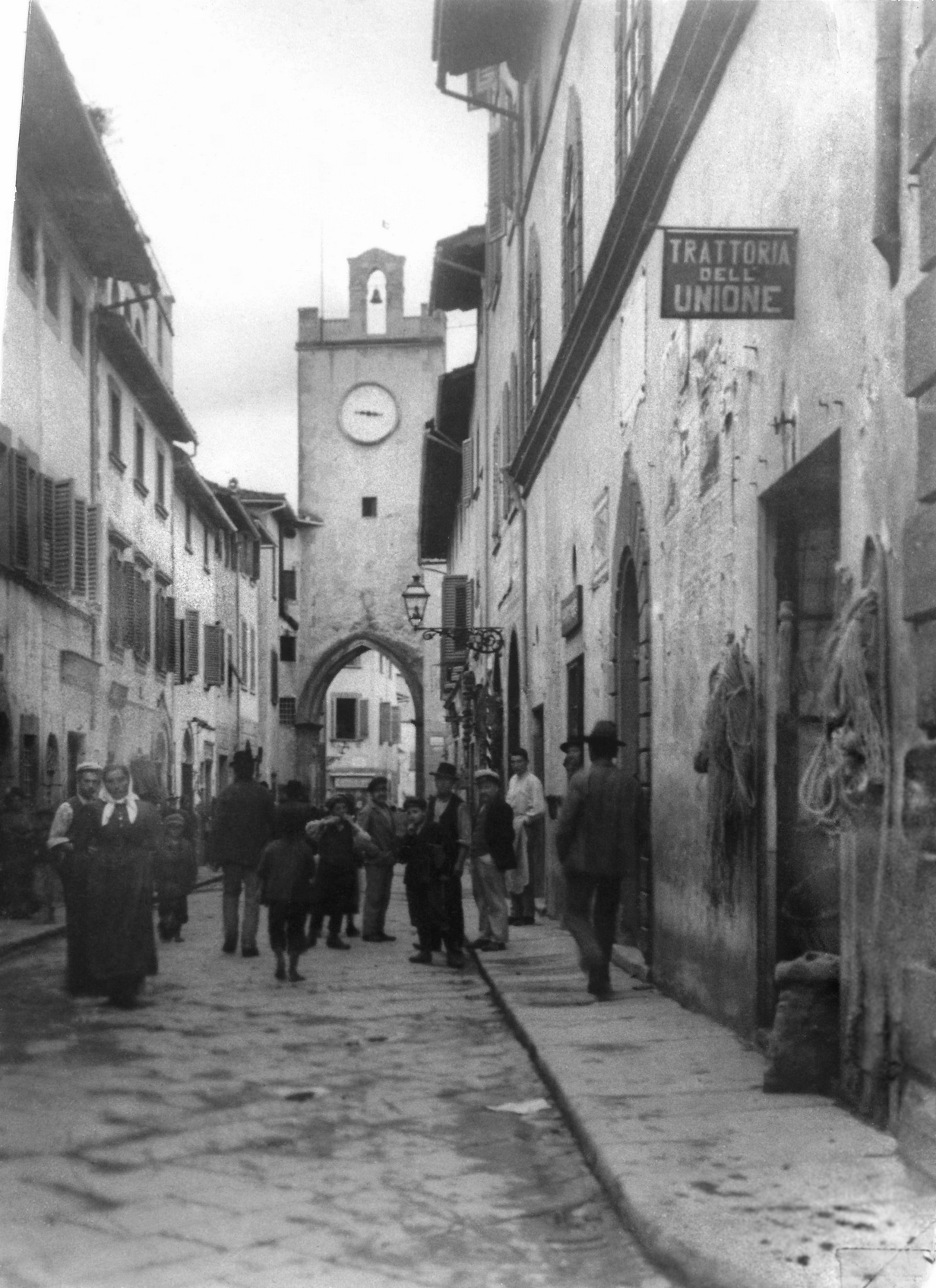
The main street and the clock tower in 1904

== History ==
The first settlements in the central area of Mugello, later occupied by Borgo San Lorenzo, are certainly very ancient. There are numerous testimonies of the existence of settlements even before the Etruscans, of which we can find traces near Ronta. From the 2nd century BC, the Romans settled here, creating the village of Anneianum, on the road from Florence to Faenza.

The status of the village is obscure in Late Antiquity and the Gothic era. In the Middle Ages, the town belonged to the Ubaldini family until the 10th century AD, when it passed under the civil power of the Florentine bishop, as demonstrated by the existence of an emphyteutic contract dated 941, in which the church of San Lorenzo in Mugello is described as belonging to the Florentine chapter. Given its favourable position as a road junction, controlling a crossing over the Sieve river, Borgo San Lorenzo acquired a certain importance that allowed it to prevail over the entire surrounding area and to become the market town.

The control of the Florentine Bishop was exercised through the Bishop's Vicar, who exercised economic and civil power under the title of Podestà. This power gradually weakened in relation to the economic growth of Borgo, which in the early 13th century affected the whole of Mugello; this is also demonstrated by the use of its own measures in transactions, such as the staio and the mina burgensi.

As early as 1222, the bishop of Florence had to relinquish total control over the appointment of the jusdicente, reserving it for himself only once every four years and leaving the people a free choice for the other three years. Subsequently, there were further attempts to revolt against the bishop's authority, which in 1239 forced the then Podestà, Ubaldino della Pila, to issue an order prohibiting the building of houses and towers over 15 fathoms high.

The spirit of rebellion was led by the Guelph nobles who, in 1251, had to suffer the assault of the Ghibellines who had escaped from Florence, allied with the Lords of Romagna. Finally, in 1290, the municipality of Florence intervened and, by paying 3000 florins, acquired all the rights over Mugello.

In the following years Borgo San Lorenzo paid for its ties with the Florentine Guelph Republic, suffering attacks from the Ghibellines, as in 1303 when the town was conquered by Scarpetta degli Ordelaffi, a Ghibelline from Forlì; or as in 1312, at the coming of Arrigo VII, when the Ubaldini returned to Borgo. To protect itself from these attacks, and from the threat created by the Visconti of Milan, Florence intervened in 1351 by walling up the town of Borgo San Lorenzo and creating the new lands of Scarperia and Firenzuola.

The appearance of the town was thus regularised by means of a rectangular wall structure, with four gates with towers and a road axis that cut across the whole town lengthwise. Today's Piazza Cavour was the meeting point of the two main streets.

The town was the main centre of a league that brought together all the inhabitants of the area; it was the seat of political power, represented by a Podestà sent every six months from Florence; the men who held all public offices were also Florentine. The fact that each gate had two keys, one held by the Podestà, the other by an appointee every three months, was unusual.

In 1440 Borgo was besieged by Niccolò Piccinino, an ally of the Albizi against the Medici, but was not conquered. Between 1529 and 1530, during the siege of Florence, a mercenary captain took possession of the town and transformed it into an arsenal and shipyard for the construction of devices to be used against Florence. With the fall of the Republic in Florence, Borgo San Lorenzo became part of the Medici principality.

Under the Hapsburg-Lorraine of Tuscany, Borgo San Lorenzo became the main centre of the entire Mugello, thanks to the centrality of its position in the area and the increase in building and agriculture brought about by Grand Ducal policy. In the 19th century the town's role was confirmed with the birth of a good industrial organisation and, towards the end of the century, with the creation of a railway network linking Florence, Faenza and Pontassieve. In 1861 Borgo San Lorenzo was annexed to the Kingdom of Italy by King Vittorio Emanuele II of Savoy.

On the 1st July the 2023 Giro Donne stage 2 passed through the town.

== Geography ==
Borgo San Lorenzo borders the following municipalities: Fiesole, Firenzuola, Marradi, Palazzuolo sul Senio, Pontassieve, Scarperia e San Piero, Vaglia, Vicchio. It is considered a Zone 2 area according to the Italian Seismic classification following the PCM 3274.

== Demographic evolution ==
Historical population

Year	Pop.	±%
1861	11,237	—
1871	12,289	+9.4%
1881	12,614	+2.6%
1901	14,784	+17.2%
1911	15,579	+5.4%

Year	Pop.	±%
1921	16,432	+5.5%
1931	17,172	+4.5%
1936	16,805	−2.1%
1951	16,535	−1.6%
1961	14,498	−12.3%

Year	Pop.	±%
1971	14,199	−2.1%
1981	14,685	+3.4%
1991	15,285	+4.1%
2001	15,825	+3.5%

Source: Data from ISTAT

== Transportation ==
Access to the city of Borgo San Lorenzo includes a Trenitalia local rail service from Florence and Faenza.
