= Rufina =

- Comune
- Comune di Rufina
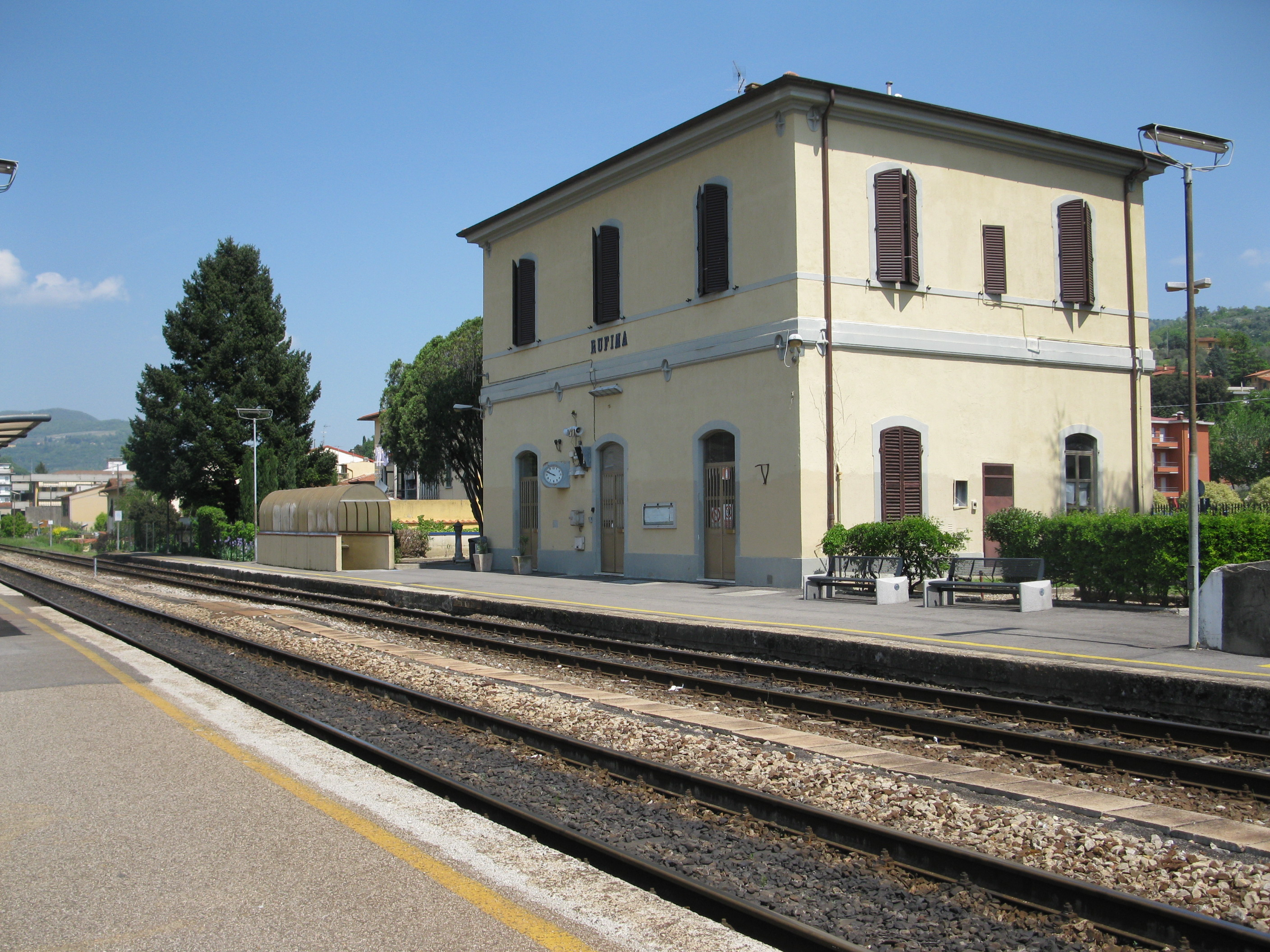
- Rufina railway station

- Coat of arms

- Location within Italy Location within Tuscany
- Coordinates: 43°49′N 11°29′E
- Country: Italy
- Region: Tuscany
- Metropolitan city: Florence (FI)
- Frazioni: Agna, Casi, Casini, Castelnuovo, Cigliano, Consuma, Contea, Falgano, Masseto, Pomino, Rimaggio, Scopeti, Selvapiana, Stentatoio, Turicchi

Government
  - Mayor: Mauro Pinzani

Area
  - Total: 45.7 km^{2} (17.6 sq mi)
- Elevation: 115 m (377 ft)

Population (2007)
  - Total: 7,382
  - Density: 162/km^{2} (418/sq mi)
- Demonym: Rufinesi
- Time zone: UTC+1 (CET)
  - Summer (DST): UTC+2 (CEST)
- Postal code: 50068
- Dialing code: 055
- Website: Official website

Rufina is a comune (municipality) in the Metropolitan City of Florence in the Italian region Tuscany, located about 20 kilometres (12 mi) east of Florence.

Rufina borders the following municipalities: Dicomano, Londa, Montemignaio, Pelago, Pontassieve, Pratovecchio.

== Main sights ==
- Church of Santo Stefano, at Castiglioni, an architectural complex formed of several buildings including a church and belltower. The interior of the church is divided into a nave and two aisles covered with a trussed ceiling.
- Church of Santa Maria at Falgano
- Pieve of San Bartolomeo at Pomino
- Church of Santa Maria del Carmine ai Fossi
- Villa di Poggio Reale, a 16th-century residence which now hosts events and conferences. A cypress-lined boulevard leads up to the facade of Villa Poggio Reale where Leopold II, Grand Duke of Tuscany stayed in 1829.
