= Pratovecchio Stia =

- Comune
- Comune di Pratovecchio Stia
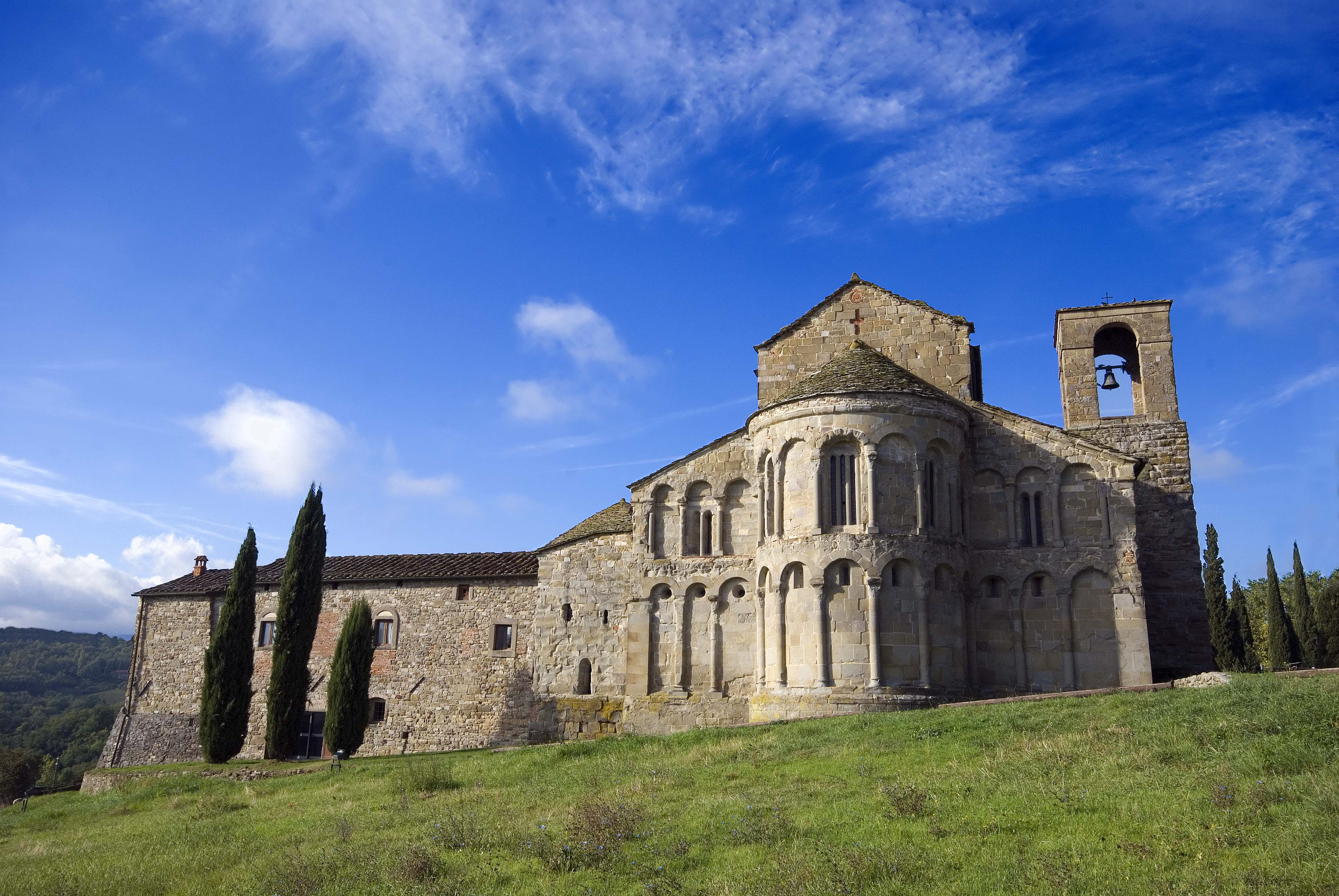
- Apse view of the pieve of Romena.

- Location within Italy Location within Tuscany
- Coordinates: 43°47′N 11°43′E
- Country: Italy
- Region: Tuscany
- Province: Arezzo (AR)
- Frazioni: Campolombardo, Casalino, Gualdo, Lonnano, Papiano, Porciano, Pratovecchio, Stia (municipal seat), Tartiglia, Villa

Government
  - Mayor: Nicolò Caleri

Area
  - Total: 138.24 km^{2} (53.37 sq mi)
- Elevation: 441 m (1,447 ft)

Population (31 May 2022)
  - Total: 5,436
  - Density: 39.32/km^{2} (101.8/sq mi)
- Demonym(s): Pratovecchini and Stiani
- Time zone: UTC+1 (CET)
  - Summer (DST): UTC+2 (CEST)
- Postal code: 52015
- Dialing code: 0575
- Saint day: January 1
- Website: Official website

Pratovecchio Stia is a comune in the province of Arezzo, Tuscany. It was formed by the merger of the two former comuni of Pratovecchio and Stia in 2014.

== History ==
Dono di Paolo, father of the Florentine artist Paolo Uccello, was a barber-surgeon from Pratovecchio. Dono moved to Florence and became a citizen there in 1373.

== Main sights ==
- Monastery and church of San Giovanni Evangelista (1134). Renovated in the 17th century, it has a Baroque portal and a single nave. Artworks include a Coronation of the Virgin by Giovanni Bizzelli (1600) and an Assumption by the Master of Pratovecchio (mid-15th century).
- Church of San Biagio, in Ama. Built in the 11th century in Romanesque style, it has a Gothic portal
- Church of Santi Vito e Modesto, in Lonnano (12th century).
- Santa Maria a Poppiena, at Poppiena, documented from 1099, in Romanesque style (notable the façade rose window). The apse is introduced by an arch and has three mullioned windows decorated in alabaster stones. It houses a 15th-century Annunciation by Giovanni dal Ponte and fragment of a 14th-century fresco of Madonna Enthroned with Child.
- Monastery of Santa Maria della Neve, founded in 1567.
- Pieve di San Pietro a Romena, in Romena. The church was built in the mid-12th century over a pre-existing edifice, perhaps dating to the 8th century. Notable are the capitals decoration of the interiors (1152). The edifice is flanked by the late-Romanesque baptistery. At Romena is also a castle where Dante Alighieri lived for a short time during his exile from Florence. The castle was destroyed in 1440 by Niccolò Piccinino's Milanese troops and later restored under the Grand Duchy of Florence. It was bombed and damaged by the Allies during World War II.
- Church of San Romolo, at Valiana, founded in 1126. It is in Romanesque style. It houses a noteworthy Pietà by an unknown master, dating from the late 14th-early 15th centuries.

== People ==
- Roberto Ghelli (born 1942), retired professional football player
