= Corella, Italy =

Corella
- Frazione
- Location of Corella in Italy
- Coordinates: 43°56′27″N 11°33′33″E
- Country: Italy
- Region: Tuscany
- Province: Florence (FI)
- Comune: Dicomano
- Elevation: 427 m (1,401 ft)

Population (2001)
  - Total: 10
- Time zone: UTC+1 (CET)
  - Summer (DST): UTC+2 (CEST)

Corella is a village (frazione) of the comune of Dicomano, Metropolitan City of Florence, central Italy. The village is located in a valley of the Apennines, about 50 km from Florence.

== History ==
=== World War II ===
On 3 September 1944, during the German withdrawal from Tuscany in the final stages of World War II, German troops entered Corella and committed acts of violence against the civilian population. An elderly displaced civilian, Giuseppe Brazzini, was shot and killed, while members of the Argivi family were subjected to robbery, threats of execution, and sexual violence. The perpetrators were never conclusively identified, although German army units operating in the Dicomano area at the time included elements of the 334th Infantry Division and the 1st Parachute Division.

== Landmarks ==
The village is home to the church of San Martino, built in the 18th century to replace an earlier medieval pieve first documented in 1184, when it was mentioned in a papal bull of Pope Lucius III as being under the patronage of the Abbey of San Miniato al Monte. The earlier parish church stood at a slightly lower elevation and exercised ecclesiastical jurisdiction over a large surrounding area, including the villages of Paterno, Ampinana, Rossoio, and Casaromana.

== People ==
Andrea del Castagno lived in Corella during the war between Florence and Milan and returned to his home after the end of that war.
