= Pelago =

- Comune
- Comune di Pelago
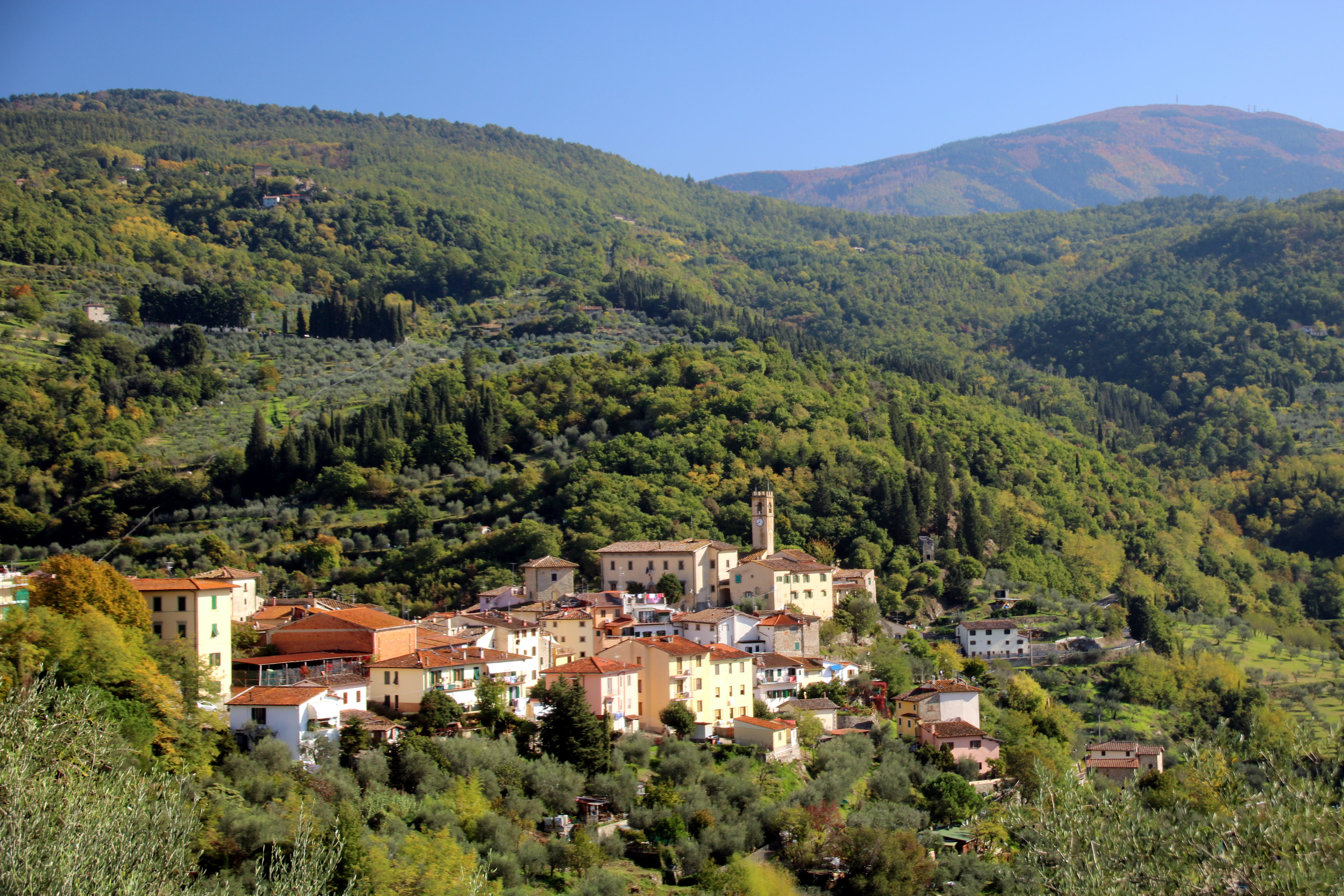
- View of Pelago, the main town in the Comune

- Location within Italy Location within Tuscany
- Coordinates: 43°46′N 11°30′E
- Country: Italy
- Region: Tuscany
- Metropolitan city: Florence (FI)
- Frazioni: Borselli, Carbonile, Consuma, Diacceto, Fontisterni, Magnale, Palaie, Paterno, Raggioli, San Francesco, Stentatoio

Area
  - Total: 54.8 km^{2} (21.2 sq mi)
- Elevation: 309 m (1,014 ft)

Population (Dec. 2004)
  - Total: 7,396
  - Density: 135/km^{2} (350/sq mi)
- Demonym: Pelaghesi
- Time zone: UTC+1 (CET)
  - Summer (DST): UTC+2 (CEST)
- Postal code: 50060 Pelago (capoluogo), 50060 Borselli, 50060 Consuma, 50060 Diacceto, 50065 Pontassieve (San Francesco), 50060 Pelago (altre frazioni)
- Dialing code: 055
- Website: Official website

Pelago is a comune (municipality) in the Metropolitan City of Florence in the Italian region Tuscany, located about 20 kilometres (12 mi) east of Florence. As of 31 December 2004, it had a population of 7,396 and an area of 54.8 square kilometres (21.2 mi^{2}).

The municipality of Pelago contains the frazioni (subdivisions, mainly villages and hamlets) Borselli, Carbonile, Consuma, Diacceto, Fontisterni, Magnale, Palaie, Paterno, Raggioli, San Francesco, and Stentatoio.

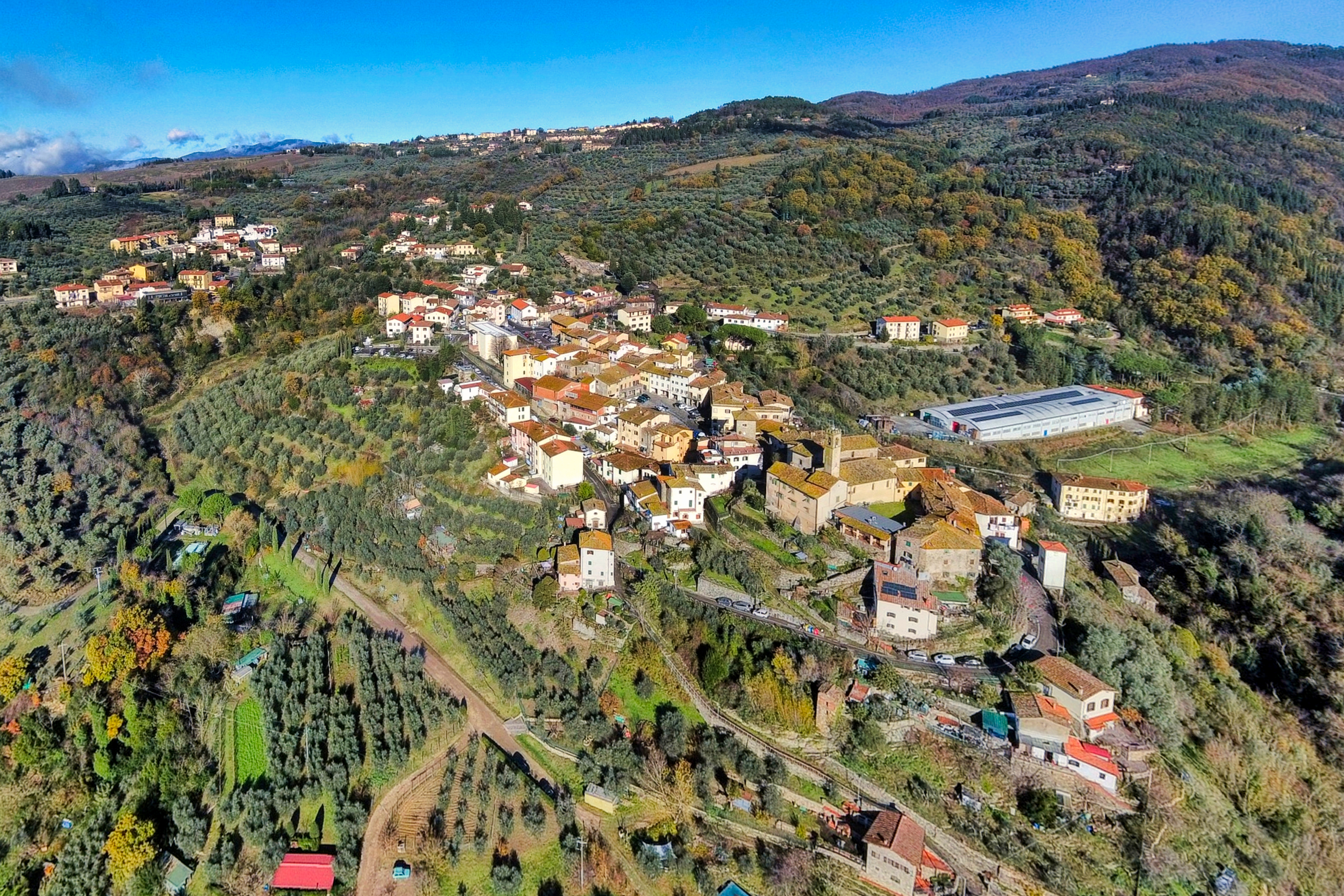
An aerial view of the village

Lorenzo Ghiberti was born in Pelago in 1378.

Pelago borders the following municipalities: Montemignaio, Pontassieve, Pratovecchio, Reggello, Rignano sull'Arno, Rufina.

== Demographic evolution ==
Historical population

Year	Pop.	±%
1861	5,393	—
1871	5,872	+8.9%
1881	5,663	−3.6%
1901	6,606	+16.7%
1911	6,692	+1.3%

Year	Pop.	±%
1921	6,611	−1.2%
1931	7,119	+7.7%
1936	7,008	−1.6%
1951	6,942	−0.9%
1961	6,632	−4.5%

Year	Pop.	±%
1971	6,989	+5.4%
1981	6,958	−0.4%
1991	7,218	+3.7%
2001	7,270	+0.7%

Source: Data from ISTAT
