= Stia =

- Frazione
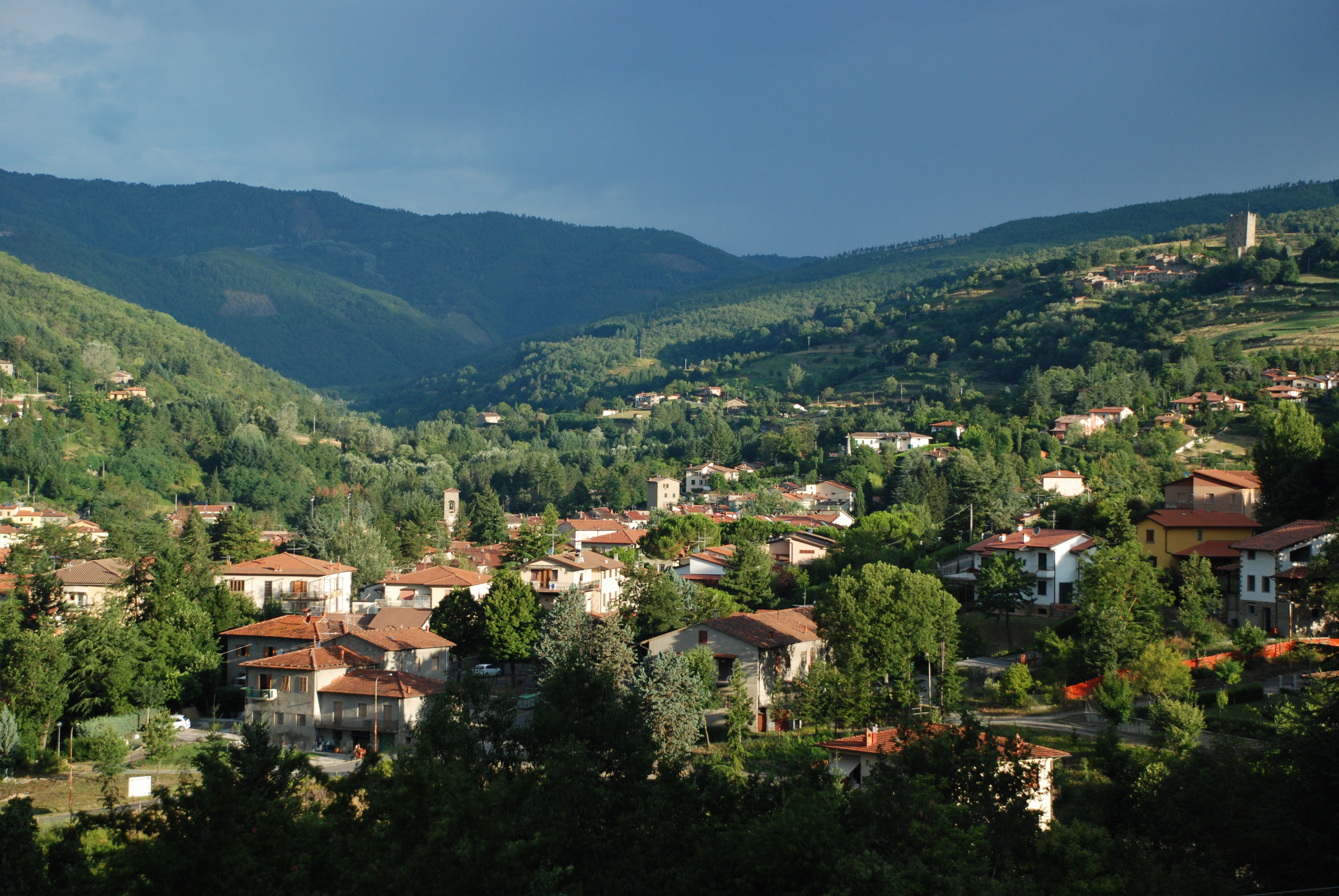

- Location of Stia in Italy
- Coordinates: 43°48′14″N 11°42′34″E
- Country: Italy
- Region: Tuscany
- Province: Arezzo (AR)
- Comune: Pratovecchio Stia
- Elevation: 441 m (1,447 ft)

Population (2011)
  - Total: 2,359
- Demonym: Stiani
- Time zone: UTC+1 (CET)
  - Summer (DST): UTC+2 (CEST)
- Postal code: 52015
- Dialing code: 0575

Stia is a frazione of the comune of Pratovecchio Stia in the Province of Arezzo in the Italian region Tuscany, located about 40 kilometres (25 mi) east of Florence and about 40 kilometres (25 mi) northwest of Arezzo. It was an independent commune until it was merged to Pratovecchio in 2014.

== Geography ==
The town of Stia is often called the "source of the Arno", although the real source is some 1,200 metres (3,900 ft) higher on the slopes of Monte Falterona. However, Stia is the first true village the Arno reaches, where it is joined by another river, the stream Staggia, that starts at Passo la Calla to the north-east. It is suggested that the name 'Stia' comes from a corruption of the river Staggia's name. As well as the being situated on the confluence of the Arno and the Staggia, Stia also has its own spring that rises in the park of Palagio Fiorentino, which has now been channelled so the water flows from 10 permanent taps.

Stia borders the following municipalities: Londa, Pratovecchio, San Godenzo and Santa Sofia. It contus the hamlets (frazioni) of Molin di Bucchio, Palazzo, Papiano, Papiano Alto, Porciano, Santa Maria alle Grazie and Vallucciole.

== History ==
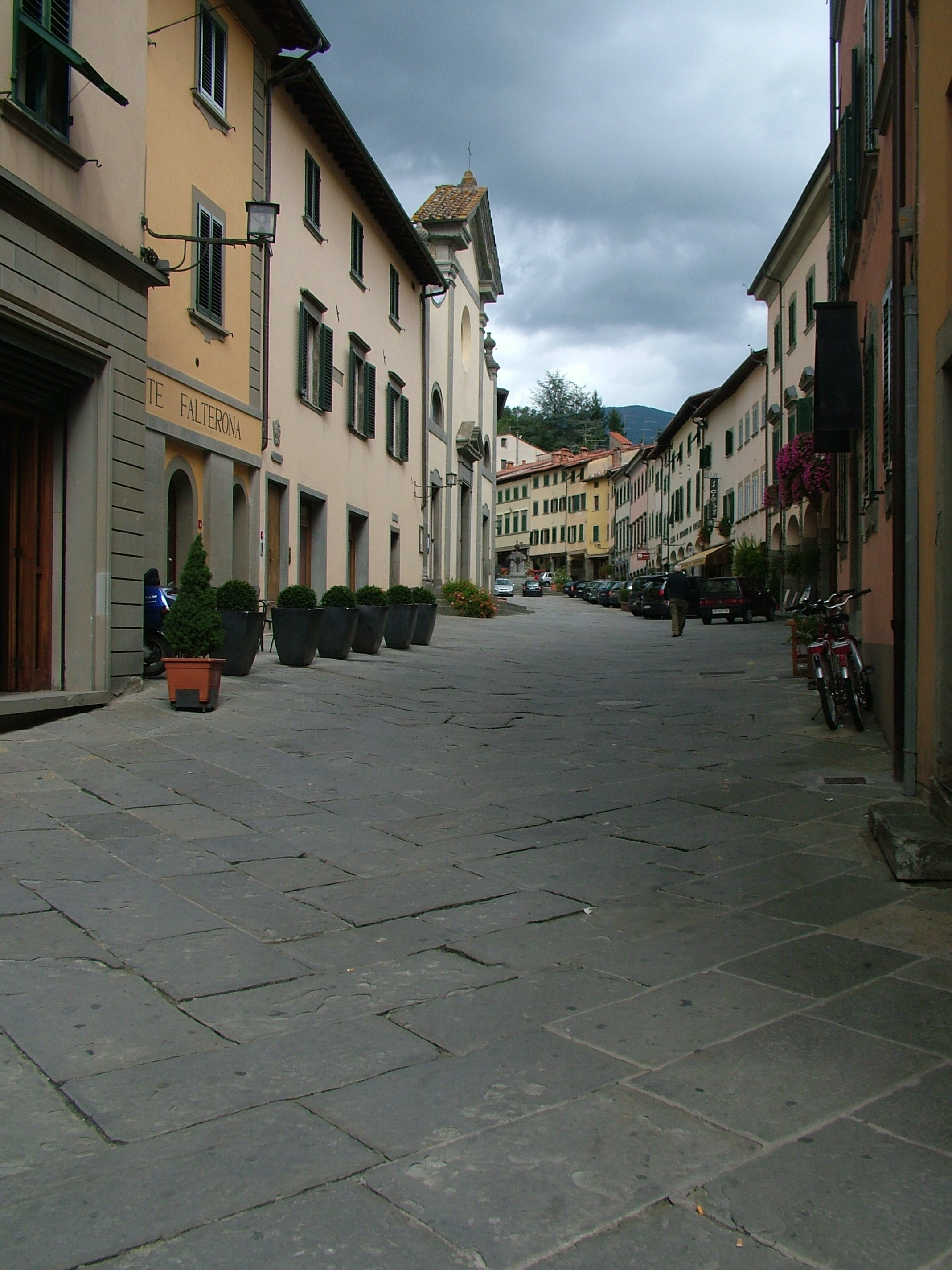
Piazza Tanucci in Stia

Stia began as the marketplace below the Guidi Castle at Porciano. This area, known as Il Palagio, served as the capital of the county of the Guidis. Until the end of the eighteenth century, the city of Stia was called Palagio Fiorentino. The first mention of the Guidi family in Stia appears in a donation deed from April 1054, drafted in the chamber of the parish priest of Santa Maria in Stia in the Casentino region. This document indicates that the donor was Count Guido, son of the late Count Alberto of Ripuarian origin.

On April 16, 1311, while Emperor Henry VII was besieging Cremona, Dante addressed a letter to him from "in finibus Thusciae, sub fontem Sarni," meaning "on the borders of Tuscany, under the source of the Arno," referring to the Castle of Porciano. At that time, the lords of the castle were Counts Tancredi and Bandino Guidi of Porciano, who, as fervent Ghibellines, assisted the ambassadors of Henry VII in their passage from Mugello to Casentino in 1312. Tancredi personally presented his allegiance to Henry upon his arrival in Tuscany.

The fact that the counts of Porciano -- the most combative branch the Guidi family in Casentino -- were also the lords of Palagio, or Stia Vecchia, is confirmed by the Florentine historian Scipione Ammirato. He notes that in 1358, a Count Francesco da Porciano served the Florentines as a cavalry commander and was later referred to as Count Francesco da Palagio in 1363. According to Ammirato, this Count Francesco was the same as Count Guido Francesco of the Guidi counts, who died in 1369. Guido Francesco entrusted the guardianship of his children and their castles, including Porciano and its related possessions, to the Signoria of Florence in 1402. It was renamed Palagio Fiorentino, a name it retained until the eighteenth century.

Due to the unique topography, the central piazza is not a typical square but an unusual triangular shape, sloping steeply at its far end. Today, it is known as Piazza Tanucci, named after Bernardo Tanucci, an Italian statesman born in Stia in 1698.

Stia features a pair of covered arcades that run along either side of the piazza, now home to various shops, bars, and restaurants. Entering the piazza from the lower end, the Baroque facade of Santa Maria della Assunta dominates the left side of the street. The plain 19th-century exterior conceals a well-preserved Romanesque interior that is at least six hundred years older.

The original church was built around 1150 for the Guidi Counts at Porciano, though a sacred site was documented here as early as 1017. The original facade was demolished in 1776 when the piazza was enlarged and was rebuilt in the present Baroque style.

Inside, sandstone columns are topped with capitals decorated with floral motifs, animals, and stylized figures. The church also houses a glazed blue-and-white terracotta Madonna and Child, an exquisite example of Andrea della Robbia's work.

The campanile at the rear of the church has undergone several alterations throughout its history, with the current belfry and clock added in the eighteenth century.

Historically, the Casentino was a fertile valley with various industries that contributed to its prosperity. Timber was vital during the Medici period for shipbuilding, and woolen fabric production initially clothed the monks and nuns in the area and later the wealthy families of Tuscany. 'Panno Casentino' was originally made with yarn spun by local women at home and was later produced in modern cloth mills along the Staggia River (Ella Noyes, 1905). The production of Panno Casentino played an important role in the local economy, leading to the construction and expansion of a significant woolen mill. At its peak, the largest wool mill in Stia, built in 1838, employed over 500 people and produced 700,000 meters of cloth annually.

The factory is now a museum dedicated to wool production.

== Transport ==
Stia hosts the final railway station of the line that runs down the valley, following the Arno, to Arezzo. The line is popularly known as the "Treno del Casentino" (the Casentino Train), and is owned by the company LFI.

== Sources ==
- Eckenstein, Lina. Through the Casentino with Hints for the Traveller (London, J.M.Dent & Co., 1902).
- Jepson, Tim; Buckley, Johnathan; Ellingham, Mark. Tuscany & Umbria (London, Rough Guides, 2003).
- Kleinhenz, Christopher (ed). Medieval Italy: An Encyclopedia (New York, Routledge, 2004).
- Machiavelli, Niccolò. The History of Florence (A New Translation. London, Henry Bohn, 1847).
- Noyes, Ella. The Casentino and its Story (London, J.M.Dent & Co, 1905).
- Ring, Trudy; Sulkin, Robert; La Boda, Sharon (eds). International Dictionary of Historic Places: Southern Europe, Vol 3 (New York, Routledge, 1996).
- Trollope, T. Adolophus. A History of the Commonwealth of Florence (London, Chapman and Hall, 1865).
- Wickham, C.J. The Mountain and the City: The Tuscan Appennines in the Early Middle Age (Oxford, Clarendon Press, 1988).
- Williams, H.W. Travels in Italy, Greece, and the Ionian Islands (Edinburgh, Archibald Constable & Co., 1820).
