= Londa, Tuscany =

Londa
- Comune
- Comune di Londa
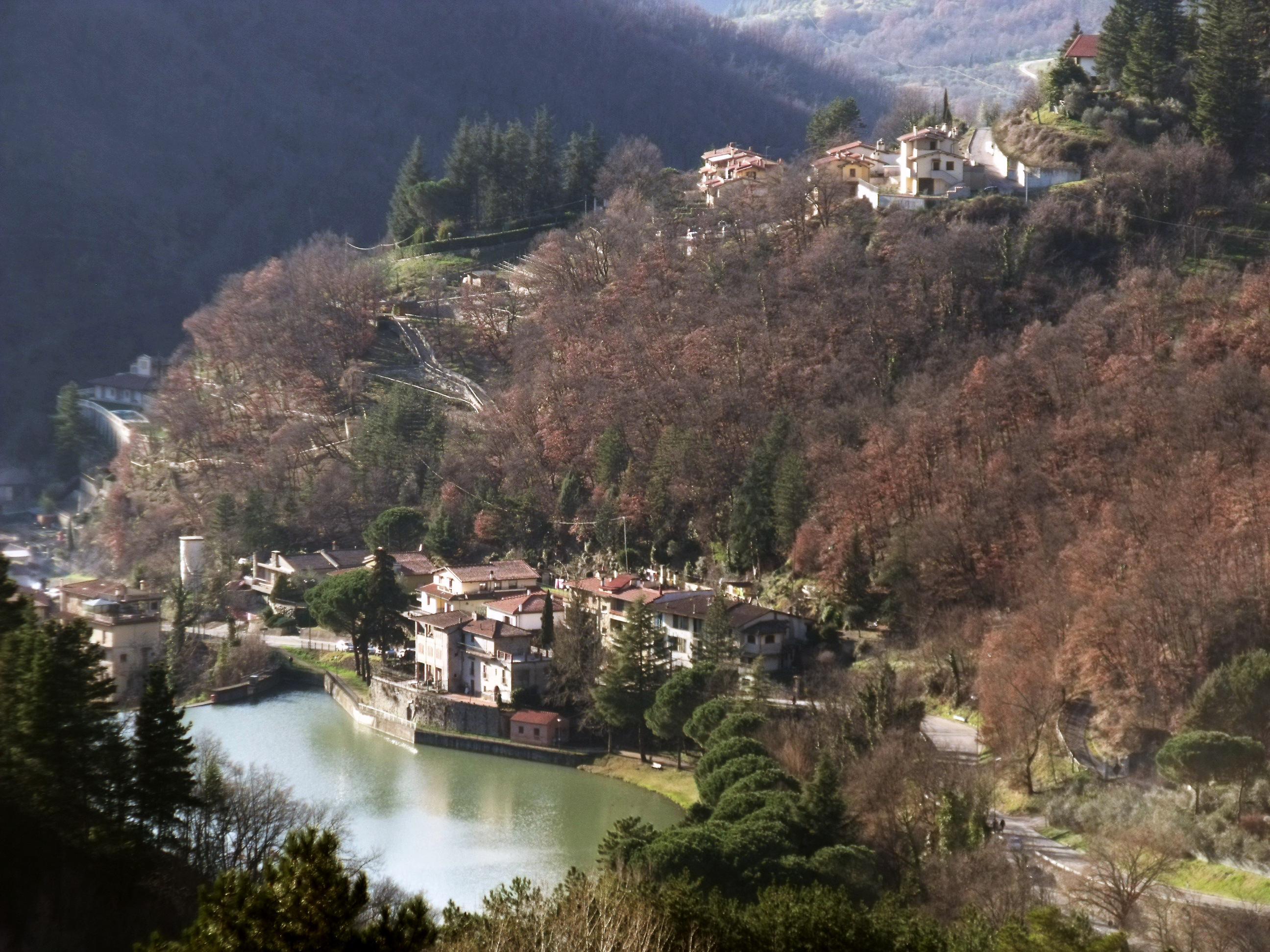
- Panorama of Londa

- Coat of arms

- Location within Italy Location within Tuscany
- Coordinates: 43°51′46″N 11°34′12″E
- Country: Italy
- Region: Tuscany
- Metropolitan city: Florence (FI)
- Frazioni: Caiano, Fornace, Rincine, Rata, Vierle, Petroio, Bucigna, Sambucheta, San Leolino.

Government
  - Mayor: Aleandro Murras

Area
  - Total: 59.4 km^{2} (22.9 sq mi)
- Elevation: 226 m (741 ft)

Population (31 August 2007)
  - Total: 1,840
  - Density: 31.0/km^{2} (80.2/sq mi)
- Demonym: Londesi
- Time zone: UTC+1 (CET)
  - Summer (DST): UTC+2 (CEST)
- Postal code: 50060
- Dialing code: 055
- Patron saint: Immaculate Conception
- Saint day: 8 December
- Website: Official website

Londa is a municipality in the Metropolitan City of Florence in the central Italian region Tuscany.

== Geography ==
The neighbouring communes are Dicomano, Pratovecchio, Rufina, San Godenzo and Stia.

The toponym is first recorded in a document of 1028 as Unda, meaning "wave" and alluding to the torrent on which it is situated. The wave appears in the communal coat of arms.
