= Roberto Ghelli =

Italian footballer

Personal information
- Date of birth: 28 February 1942 (age 84)
- Place of birth: Pratovecchio, Italy
- Position: Striker

Senior career*
| Years | Team | Apps | (Gls) |
| 1960–1961 | Internazionale | 1 | (0) |
| 1961–1966 | Del Duca Ascoli | 81 | (?) |
| 1966–1967 | Prato | 19 | (4) |
| 1967–1968 | Rimini | 36 | (7) |
- * Club domestic league appearances and goals

Roberto Ghelli (born 28 February 1942 in Pratovecchio) is a retired Italian professional football player.

== See also ==
- Football in Italy
- List of football clubs in Italy
