= Marradi =

- Comune
- Comune di Marradi
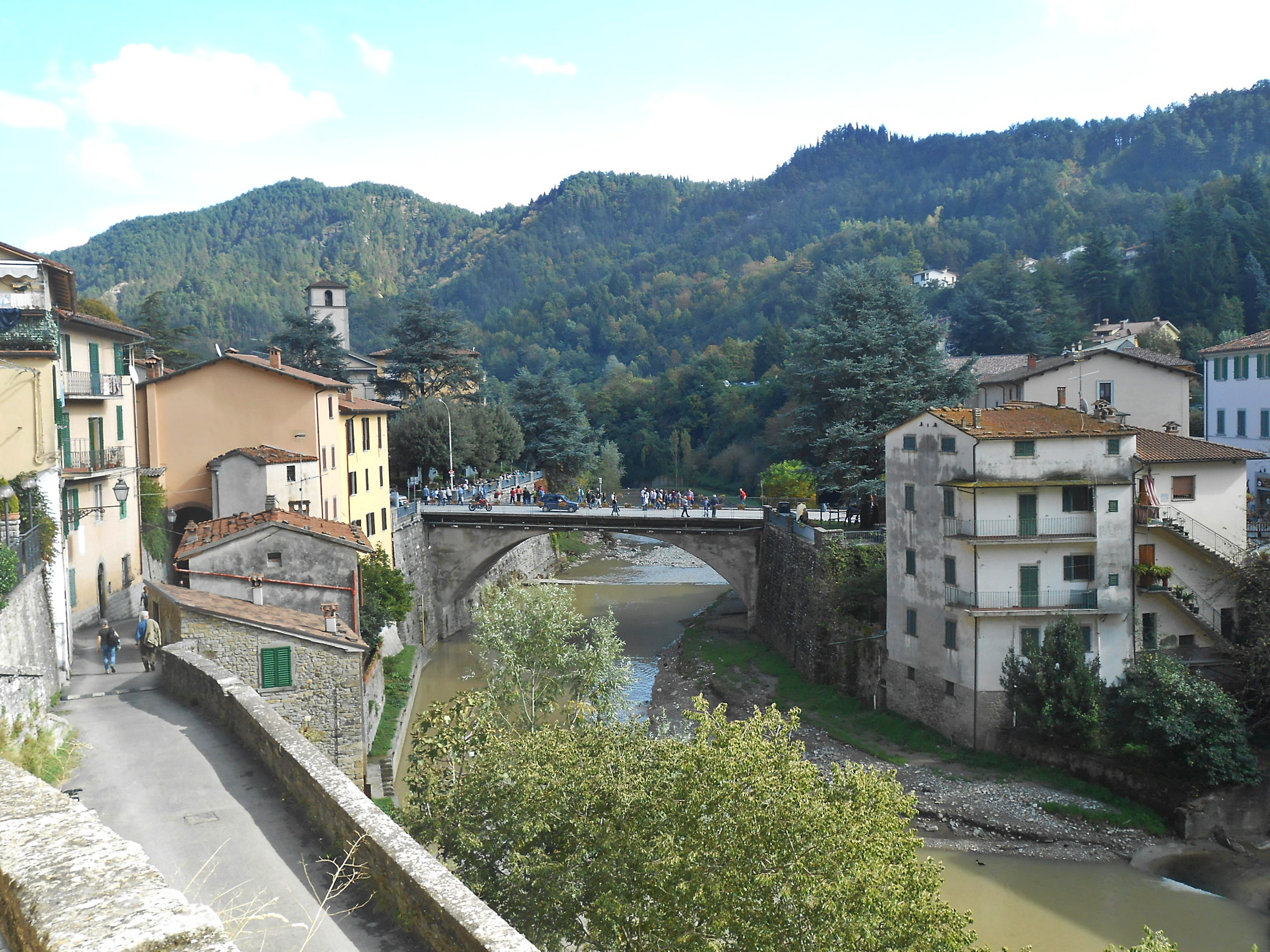
- Marradi

- Location within Italy Location within Tuscany
- Coordinates: 44°5′N 11°37′E
- Country: Italy
- Region: Tuscany
- Metropolitan city: Florence (FI)
- Frazioni: Abeto, Badia del Borgo Caset., Biforco, Campigno, Crespino, Popolano, Sant'Adriano, Val della Meta

Government
  - Mayor: Tommaso Triberti

Area
  - Total: 154.07 km^{2} (59.49 sq mi)
- Elevation: 328 m (1,076 ft)

Population (30 September 2017)
  - Total: 3,072
  - Density: 19.94/km^{2} (51.64/sq mi)
- Demonym: Marradesi
- Time zone: UTC+1 (CET)
  - Summer (DST): UTC+2 (CEST)
- Postal code: 50034
- Dialing code: 055
- Website: Official website

Marradi (Romagnol: Maré) is a comune (municipality) in the Metropolitan City of Florence in the Italian region Tuscany, located about 45 kilometres (28 mi) northeast of Florence at the borders with the Emilia-Romagna region.

Marradi borders the following municipalities: Borgo San Lorenzo, Brisighella, Dicomano, Modigliana, Palazzuolo sul Senio, Portico e San Benedetto, San Godenzo, Tredozio, Vicchio.

On 1st of July 2023 the 2nd stage of the 2023 Giro Donne finished at Marradi.

== Main sights ==
- Chiesa di Santa Maria Nascente (1112)
- Chiesa di San Ruffillo
- Hermitage of San Pier Damiani
- Badia di Santa Reparata (Badia del Borgo)
- Chiesa di San Lorenzo (Marradi)
- Communal Palace
- Palazzo Fabbroni

== People ==
- Serafino Razzi (1531–1613)
- Dino Campana (1885–1932)
- Vincenzo Castaldi (1916–1970)
- Anna Anni (1926–2011)
