= Fossi =

Fossi is a surname. Notable people with the surname include:

- Francesco Fossi (born 1988), Italian rower
- Raffaello Fossi (1928–1962), Italian painter

== See also ==
- Dossi
- Rossi (surname)
