= Palazzuolo sul Senio =

Palazzuolo sul Senio Palazzuolo di Romagna
- Comune
- Comune di Palazzuolo sul Senio
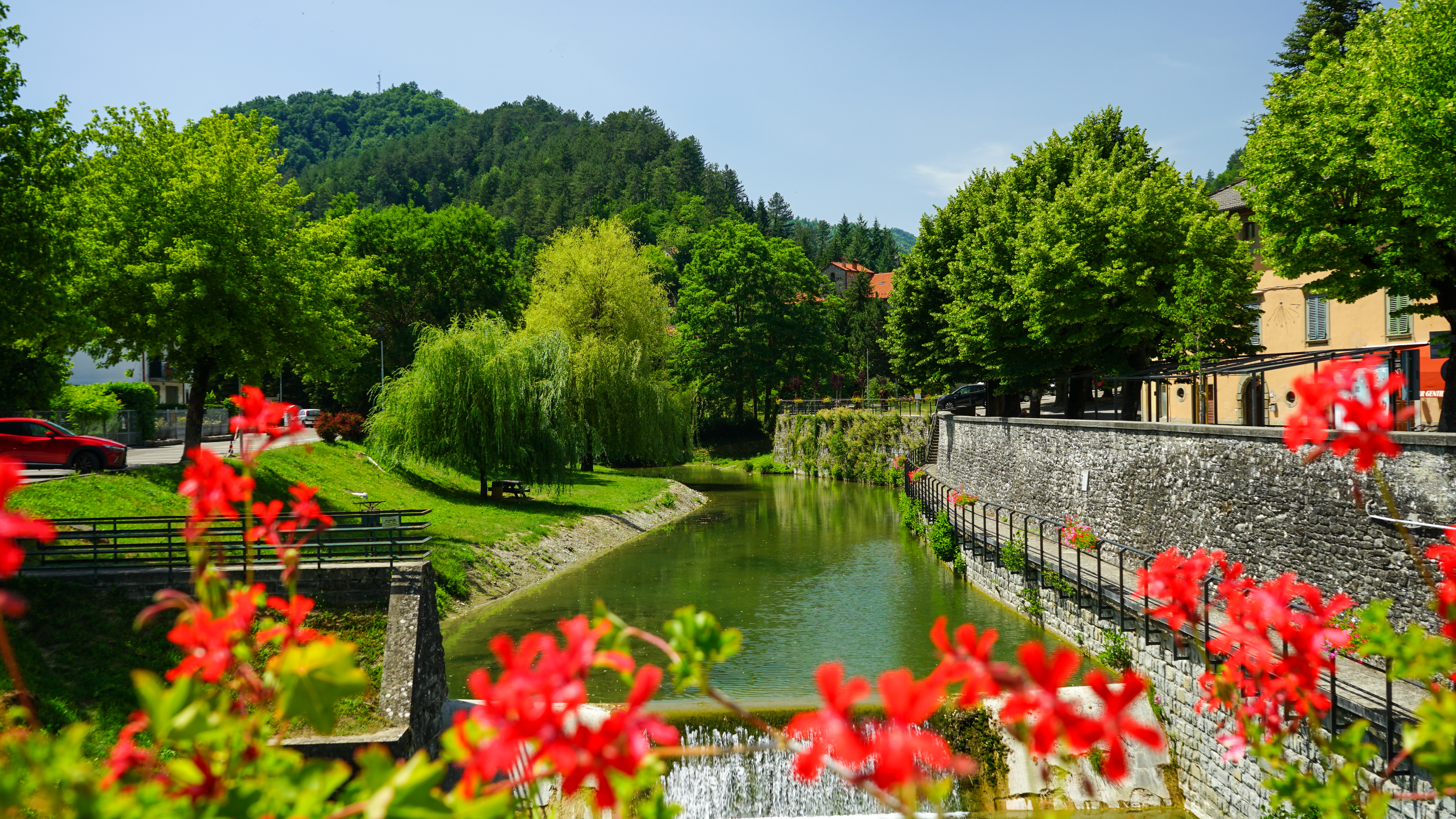
- Overview of the riverfront (Senio River)

- Coat of arms

- Location of Palazzuolo sul Senio in Italy Palazzuolo sul Senio (Tuscany)
- Coordinates: 44°7′N 11°33′E
- Country: Italy
- Region: Tuscany
- Metropolitan city: Florence (FI)
- Frazioni: Campanara, Casetta di Tiara, Mantigno, Misileo, Piedimonte, Quadalto, Salecchio, Visano

Government
  - Mayor: Marco Bottino

Area
  - Total: 109.11 km^{2} (42.13 sq mi)
- Elevation: 437 m (1,434 ft)

Population (1 January 2024)
  - Total: 1,081
  - Density: 9.907/km^{2} (25.66/sq mi)
- Demonym: Palazzuolesi
- Time zone: UTC+1 (CET)
  - Summer (DST): UTC+2 (CEST)
- Postal code: 50035
- Dialing code: 055
- ISTAT code: 048031
- Patron saint: St. Stephen
- Saint day: December 26
- Website: Official website

Palazzuolo sul Senio (formerly Palazzolo di Romagna; Romagnolo: Palazol) is a comune (municipality) in the Metropolitan City of Florence in the Italian region Tuscany, located about 45 kilometres (28 mi) northeast of Florence.

Palazzuolo sul Senio borders the following municipalities: Borgo San Lorenzo, Brisighella, Casola Valsenio, Castel del Rio, Firenzuola, Marradi.

Since 2018, it has been designated as one of I Borghi più belli d'Italia ("The most beautiful villages of Italy").
