= Capraia e Limite =

- Comune
- Comune di Capraia e Limite
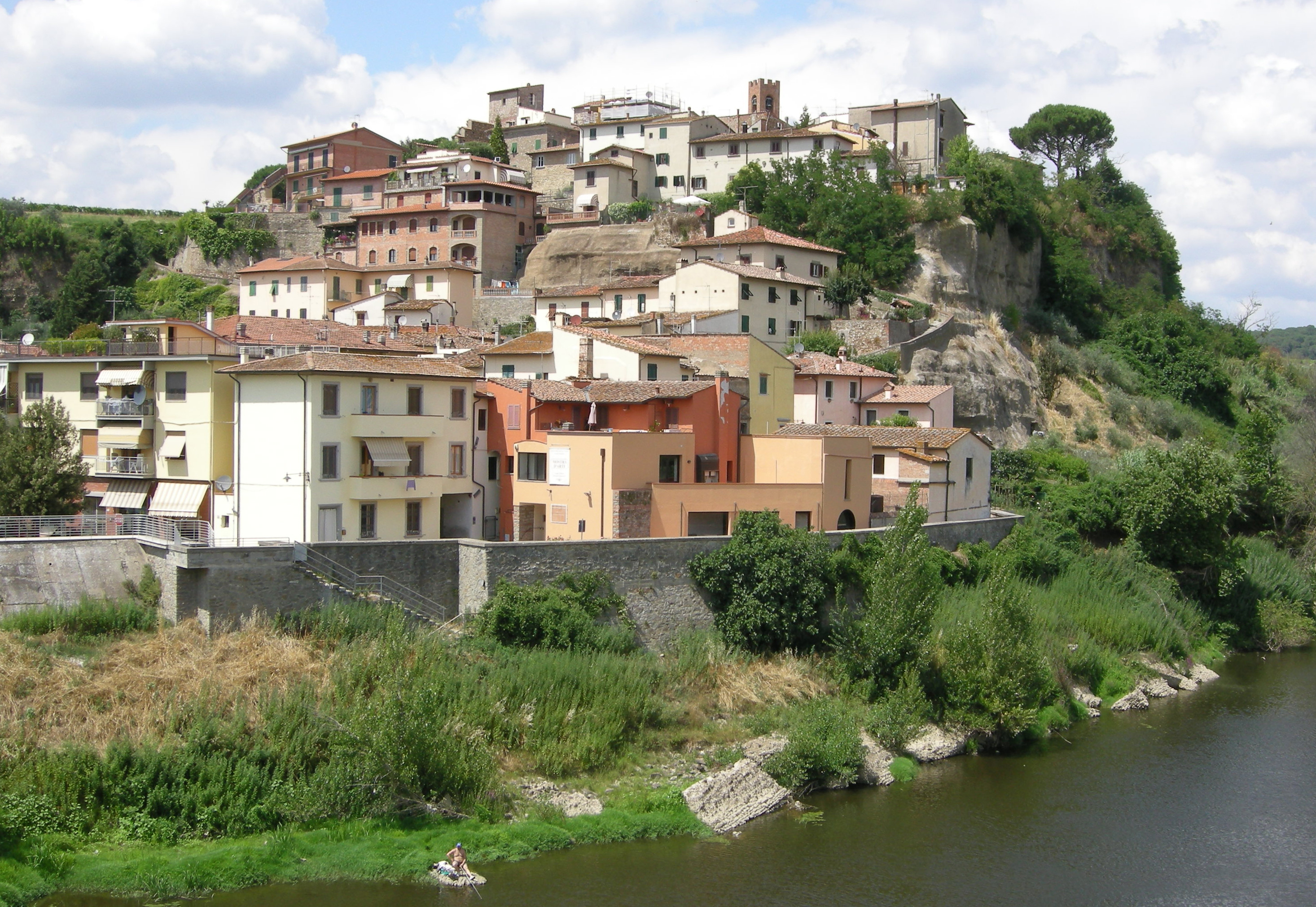
- Panorama of Capraia

- Location within Italy Location within Tuscany
- Coordinates: 43°45′N 10°59′E
- Country: Italy
- Region: Tuscany
- Metropolitan city: Florence (FI)
- Frazioni: Capraia Fiorentina, Castra, Limite sull'Arno, Pulignano

Government
  - Mayor: Alessandro Giunti

Area
  - Total: 24.92 km^{2} (9.62 sq mi)
- Elevation: 28 m (92 ft)

Population (31 May 2017)
  - Total: 7,730
  - Density: 310/km^{2} (803/sq mi)
- Demonym(s): Capraini and Limitesi
- Time zone: UTC+1 (CET)
  - Summer (DST): UTC+2 (CEST)
- Postal code: 50050
- Dialing code: 0571
- Patron saint: St. Stephen (Capraia)
- Saint day: 26 December
- Website: Official website

Capraia e Limite is a comune (municipality) in the Metropolitan City of Florence in the Italian region Tuscany, located about 20 kilometres (12 mi) west of Florence. It consists of two main centers, Capraia Fiorentina e Limite sull'Arno, the latter housing the municipal seat.

Limite sull'Arno, starting from the 18th century, has been a main center of shipmaking in the Grand Duchy of Tuscany.

== Twin towns ==
- (Western Sahara) Bir Lehlu, Sahrawi Arab Democratic Republic
