= Vicchio =

- Comune
- Comune di Vicchio
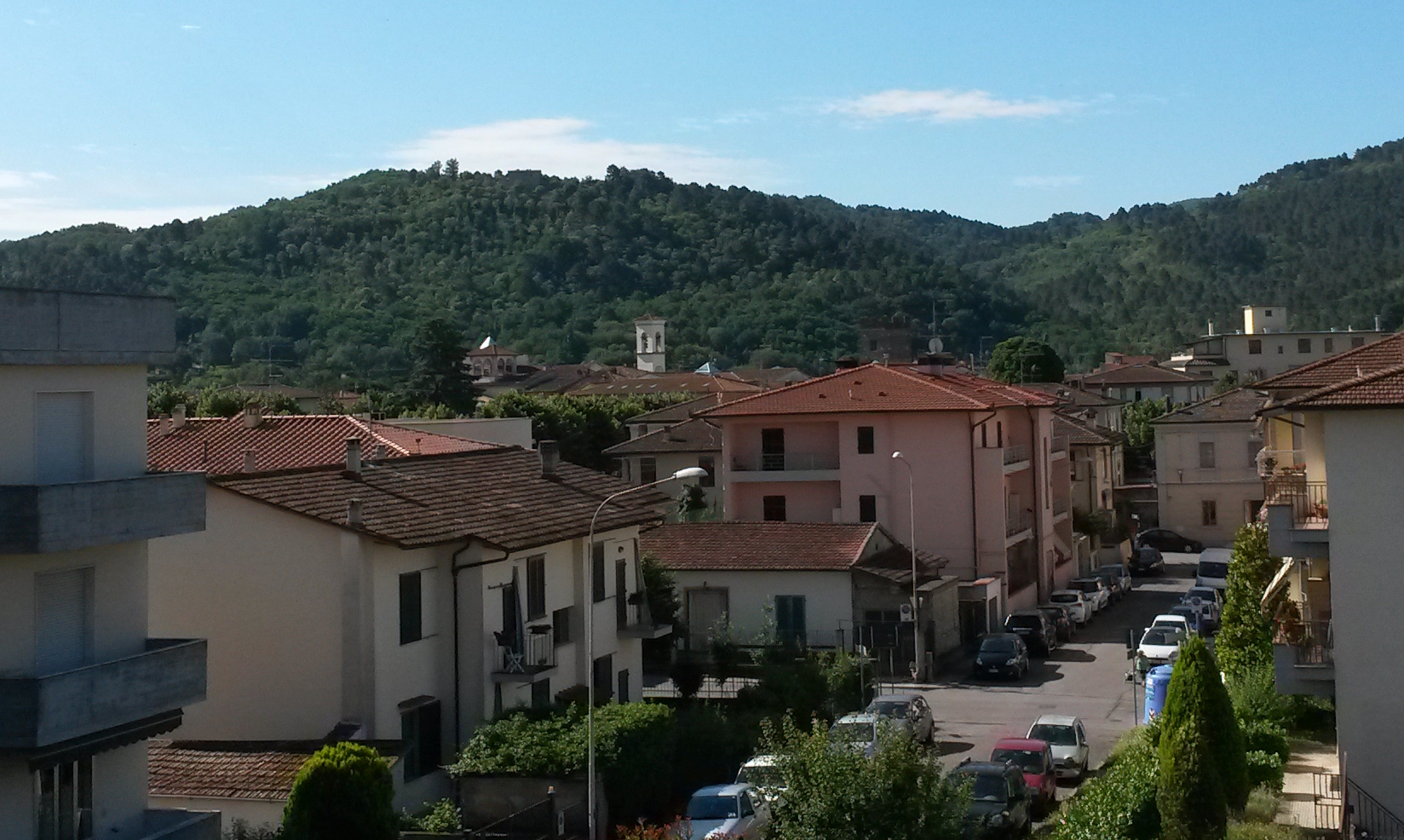
- Panoramic view of town's center

- Coat of arms

- Vicchio within the Province of Florence

- Location within Italy Location within Tuscany
- Coordinates: 43°56′N 11°28′E
- Country: Italy
- Region: Tuscany
- Metropolitan city: Florence (FI)
- Frazioni: Ampinana, Arsella, Barbiana, Boccagnello, Bovino, Bricciana, Campestri, Casole, Cistio, Cuccino, Farneto, Gattaia, Gracchia, Mirandola, Molezzano, Mulinuccio, Padule, Paterno, Piazzano, Pilarciano, Pimaggiore, Ponte a Vicchio, Rossoio, Rostolena, Rupecanina, Scopeto, Uliveta, Vespignano, Vezzano, Villore, Zufolana

Government
  - Mayor: Roberto Izzo

Area
  - Total: 139.0 km^{2} (53.7 sq mi)
- Elevation: 203 m (666 ft)

Population (2016)
  - Total: 8,105
  - Density: 58.31/km^{2} (151.0/sq mi)
- Demonym: Vicchiesi
- Time zone: UTC+1 (CET)
  - Summer (DST): UTC+2 (CEST)
- Postal code: 50039
- Dialing code: 055
- Patron saint: St. John the Baptist
- Saint day: June 24
- Website: Official website

Vicchio is a town and comune (municipality) in the Metropolitan City of Florence in the Italian region Tuscany, located about 25 kilometres (16 mi) northeast of Florence. As of 2016, it had a population of 8,105 and an area of 139.0 square kilometres (53.7 mi^{2}).

== Geography ==
Vicchio borders the municipalities of Borgo San Lorenzo, Dicomano, Marradi and Pontassieve. It counts the hamlets (frazioni) of Ampinana, Arsella, Barbiana, Boccagnello, Bovino, Bricciana, Campestri, Casole, Cistio, Cuccino, Farneto, Gattaia, Gracchia, Mirandola, Molezzano, Mulinuccio, Padule, Paterno, Piazzano, Pilarciano, Pimaggiore, Ponte a Vicchio, Rossoio, Rostolena, Rupecanina, Scopeto, Uliveta, Vespignano, Vezzano, Villore and Zufolana.

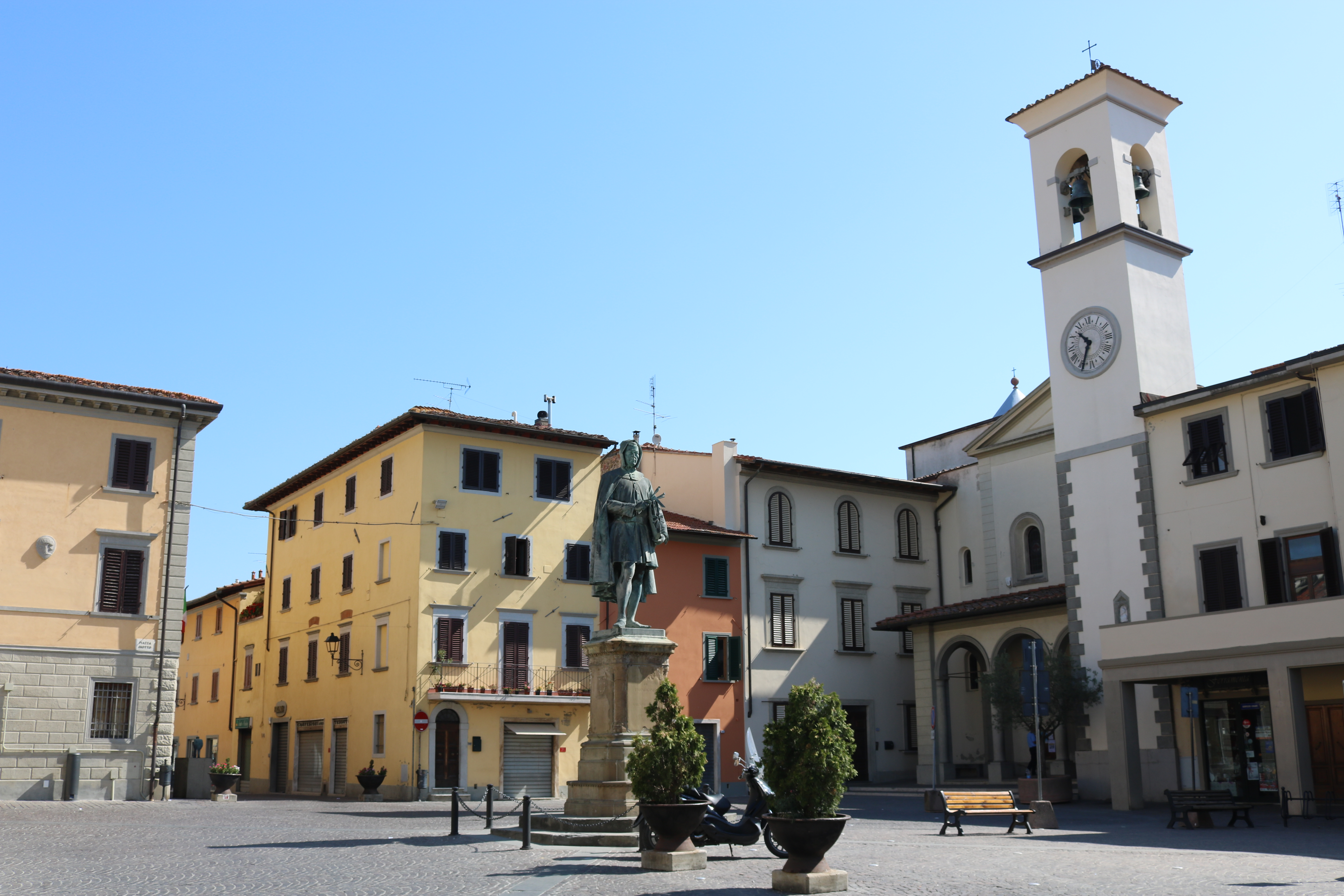
Piazza Giotto in the town centre

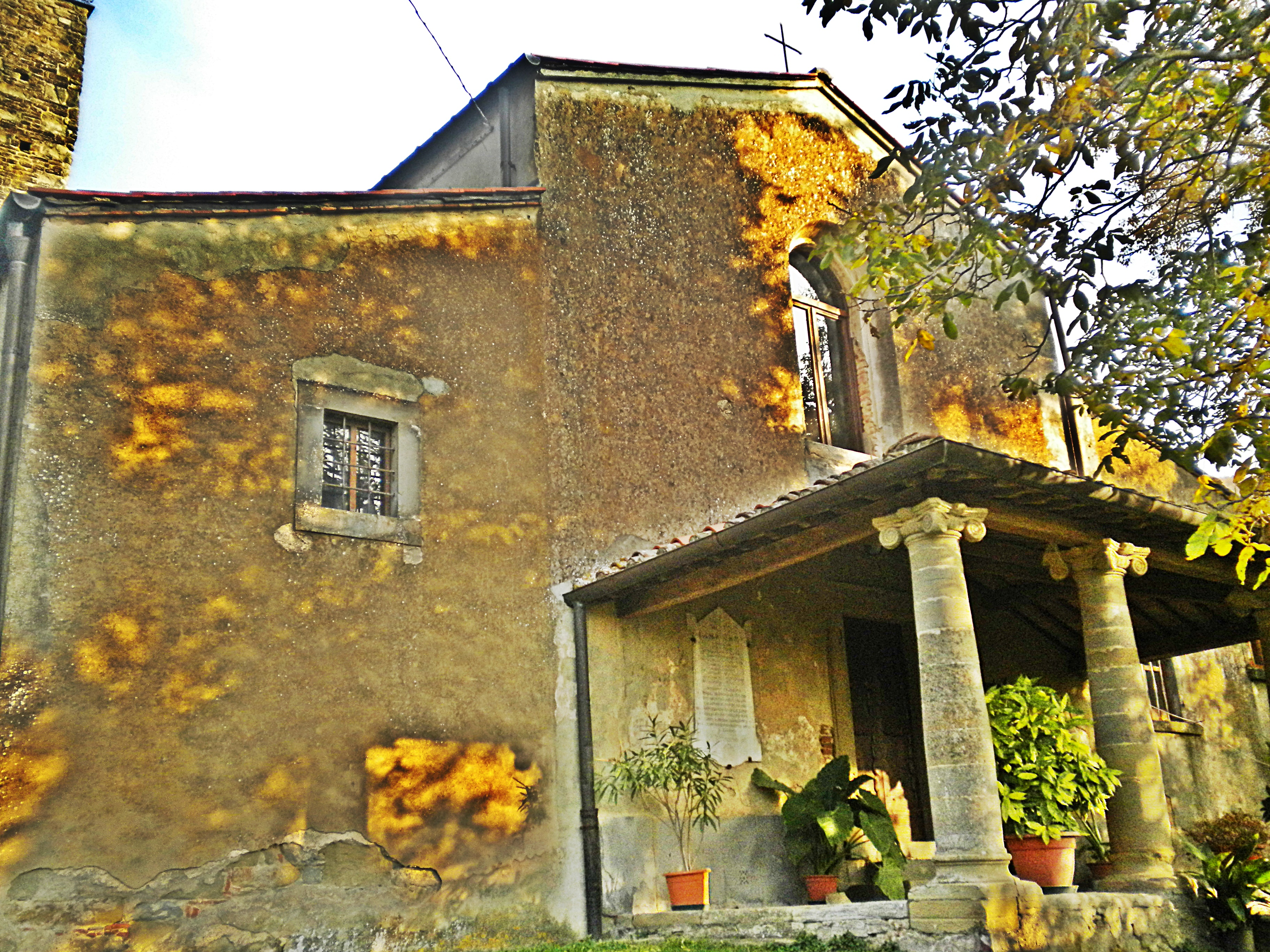
Church of San Lorenzio in Villore

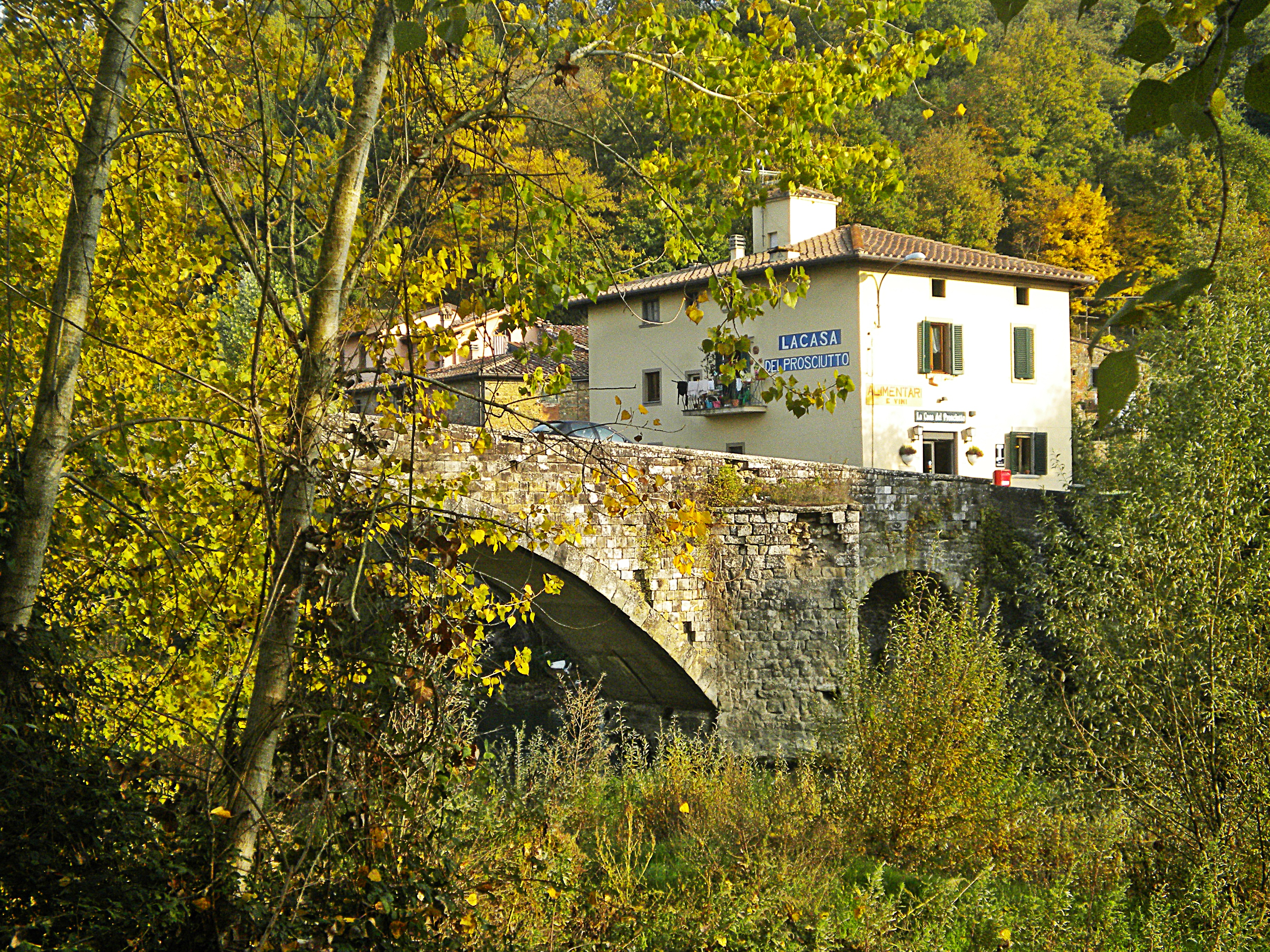
Ponte a Vicchio

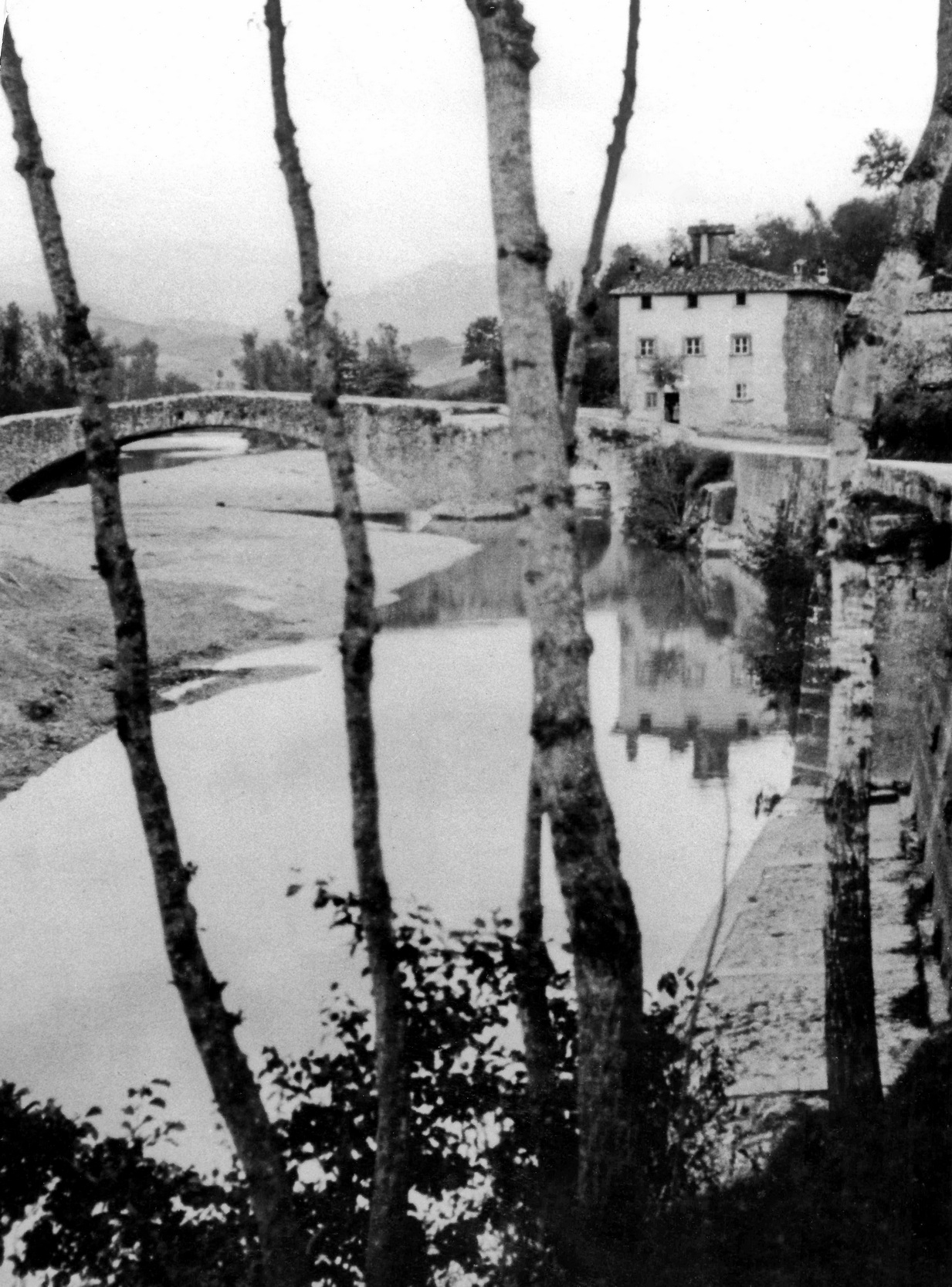
Ponte a Vicchio in 1904

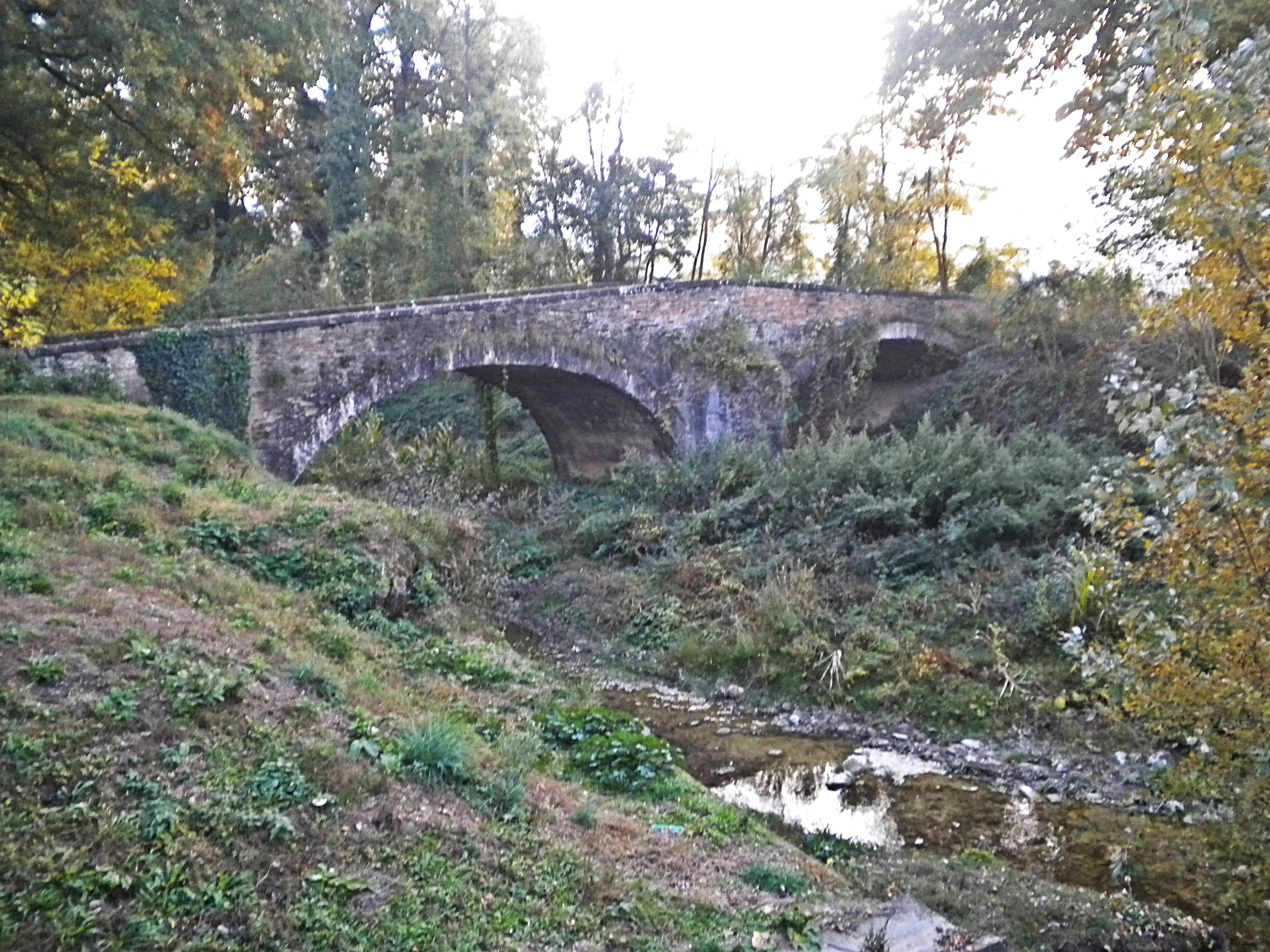
Cimabue bridge in Vespignano

== Demographics ==
Historical population

Year	Pop.	±%
1861	8,302	—
1871	8,967	+8.0%
1881	8,943	−0.3%
1901	11,894	+33.0%
1911	12,381	+4.1%
1921	12,860	+3.9%

Year	Pop.	±%
1931	12,080	−6.1%
1936	11,551	−4.4%
1951	10,462	−9.4%
1961	7,660	−26.8%
1971	5,917	−22.8%
1981	5,976	+1.0%

Year	Pop.	±%
1991	6,271	+4.9%
2001	7,145	+13.9%
2011	8,117	+13.6%
2016	8,105	−0.1%

Source: Data from ISTAT

== Personalities ==
- Many famous Italian painters were born near Vicchio: Giotto (in the frazione of Colle di Vespignano), Fra Angelico (at Rupecanina), Giovanni Malesci, Rutilio Muti, Armeno Mattioli and Foresto Marianini. There is a 3.2 meter statue of Giotto in Vicchio's central square, the Piazza di Giotto. It was also the birthplace of Jean-Baptiste Lully (Baptized Giovanni Battista Lulli), who would become the founder of the French opera tradition.
- Two victims of the Monster of Florence (killed nearby the town in 1984), Pia Rontini and Claudio Stefanacci, were citizens of Vicchio.

== Twin cities ==
- Tolmin, Slovenia, since 1981
- Tifariti, Western Sahara
