= San Godenzo =

- Comune
- Comune di San Godenzo
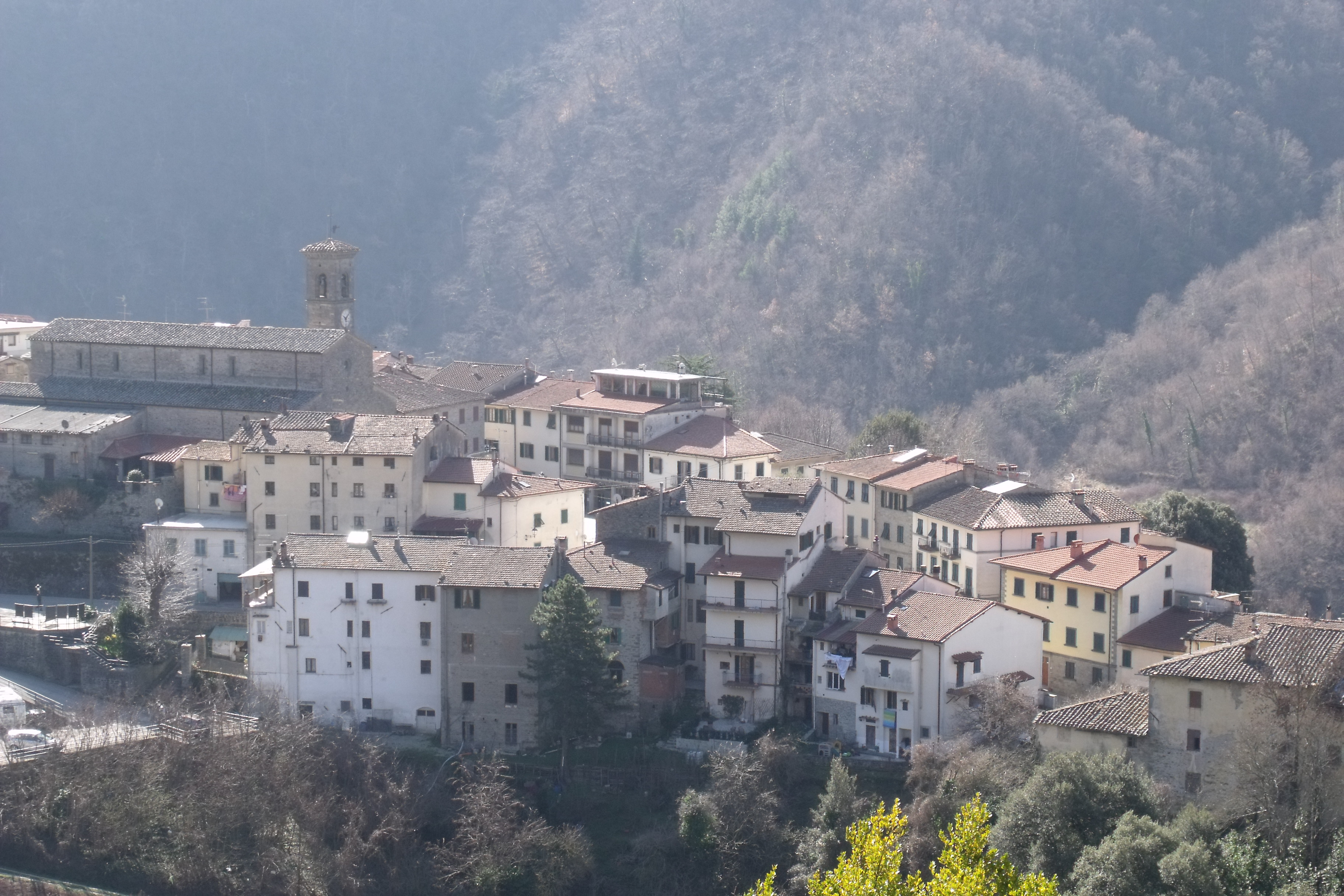
- Panorama of San Godenzo
- Coat of arms
- Location within Italy Location within Tuscany
- Coordinates: 43°55′N 11°37′E
- Country: Italy
- Region: Tuscany
- Metropolitan city: Florence (FI)
- Frazioni: Casale, Castagneto, Castagno d'Andrea, Cavallino, Petrognano, San Bavello

Government
  - Mayor: Alessandro Manni

Area
  - Total: 98.9 km^{2} (38.2 sq mi)
- Elevation: 404 m (1,325 ft)

Population (Dec. 2004)
  - Total: 1,237
  - Density: 12.5/km^{2} (32.4/sq mi)
- Time zone: UTC+1 (CET)
  - Summer (DST): UTC+2 (CEST)
- Postal code: 50060
- Dialing code: 055

San Godenzo is a comune (municipality) in the Metropolitan City of Florence in the Italian region Tuscany, located about 35 kilometres (22 mi) northeast of Florence, in the Tuscan-Emilian Apennines.

San Godenzo borders the following municipalities: Dicomano, Londa, Marradi, Portico e San Benedetto, Premilcuore, Santa Sofia, Stia.

Located at the foot of the Monte Falterona, it is one of the accesses to the Foreste Casentinesi, Monte Falterona e Campigna National Park. The frazione of Castagno d'Andrea was the birthplace of the Renaissance painter Andrea del Castagno.

== Demographic evolution ==
Historical population

Year	Pop.	±%
1861	3,387	—
1871	3,581	+5.7%
1881	3,688	+3.0%
1901	3,867	+4.9%
1911	4,068	+5.2%

Year	Pop.	±%
1921	3,943	−3.1%
1931	3,644	−7.6%
1936	3,557	−2.4%
1951	3,155	−11.3%
1961	2,169	−31.3%

Year	Pop.	±%
1971	1,397	−35.6%
1981	1,162	−16.8%
1991	1,105	−4.9%
2001	1,187	+7.4%

Source: Data from ISTAT
