= Seismic classification in Italy =

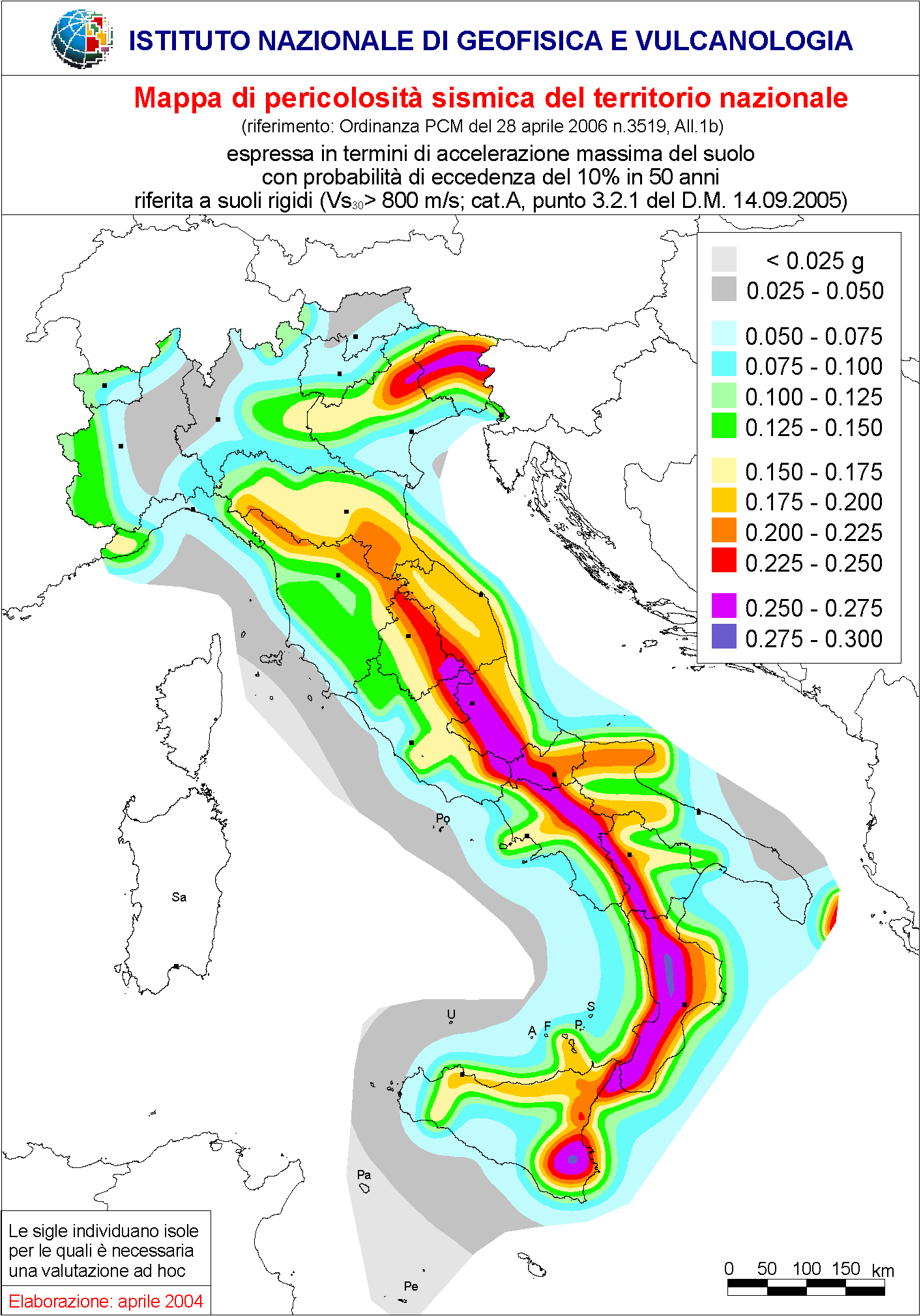
Map of seismic hazard of the Italian territory, elaborated by the INGV (Istituto Nazionale di Geofisica e Vulcanologia). The seismic hazard is expressed in terms of PGA (Peak Ground Acceleration). Stucchi M., Meletti C., Montaldo V., Akinci A., Faccioli E., Gasperini P., Malagnini L., Valensise G.. (2004) - INGV

The seismic classification in Italy (Italian: Classificazione sismica dell'Italia) is the subdivision of the territory of Italy into specific areas, characterized by a common seismic risk. Currently the seismic classification of the Italian territory into zones has remained exclusively for statistical and administrative aspects. With the legislation that came into force in 2009 (NTC08), after the earthquake that affected the city of L'Aquila, a new calculation methodology based on a point-like statistical approach is used for the purpose of anti-seismic design. Each point of the Italian territory is characterized by a precise ground acceleration value (Peak Ground Acceleration) as a function of a return time (ie a probabilistic value).

- Zone 1 : high seismicity (PGA over 0.25 g), includes 708 municipalities.
- Zone 2 : medium-high seismicity (PGA between 0.15 and 0.25 g), includes 2,345 municipalities (in Tuscany and Piedmont some municipalities are classified in Zone 3S, medium seismicity, which requires the calculation of the identical seismic action to Zone 2).
- Zone 3 : medium-low seismicity (PGA between 0.05 and 0.15 g), includes 1,560 municipalities.
- Zone 4 : low seismicity (PGA less than 0.05 g), includes 3,488 municipalities.
