= Gambassi Terme =

- Comune
- Comune di Gambassi Terme
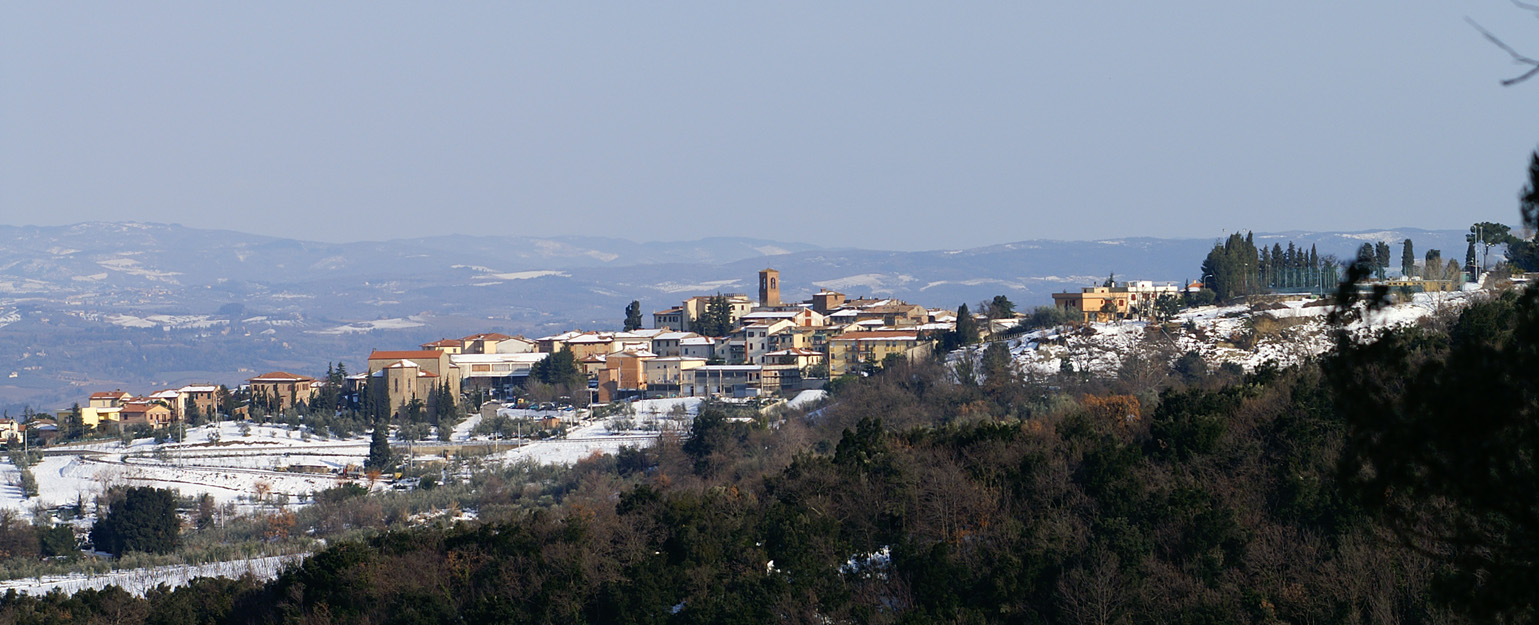

- Coat of arms

- Location within Italy Location within Tuscany
- Coordinates: 43°32′N 10°57′E
- Country: Italy
- Region: Tuscany
- Metropolitan city: Florence (FI)
- Frazioni: Badia a Cerreto, Borgoforte, Casenuove, Castagno, Catignano, Montignoso, Pillo, Varna

Government
  - Mayor: Paolo Campinoti

Area
  - Total: 83.15 km^{2} (32.10 sq mi)
- Elevation: 332 m (1,089 ft)

Population (31 August 2017)
  - Total: 4,832
  - Density: 58.11/km^{2} (150.5/sq mi)
- Demonym: Gambassini
- Time zone: UTC+1 (CET)
  - Summer (DST): UTC+2 (CEST)
- Postal code: 50050
- Dialing code: 0571
- Patron saint: St. Sebastian
- Saint day: 20 January
- Website: Official website

Gambassi Terme is a comune (municipality) in the Metropolitan City of Florence in the Italian region Tuscany, located about 35 kilometres (22 mi) southwest of Florence. It is named after the Gambassi Family, a part of the Florentine Nobility that has resided in the area since the 1350s.

== Main sights ==
- The church of San Giovanni Battista, in the frazione of Varna, which houses a replica of Andrea del Sarto's Madonna with Child and Saints.
- The Romanesque Pieve of Santa Maria Assunta (12th century)
- Parco Comunale, former garden of the Villa Sinnai.
