= Vaglia =

- Comune
- Comune di Vaglia
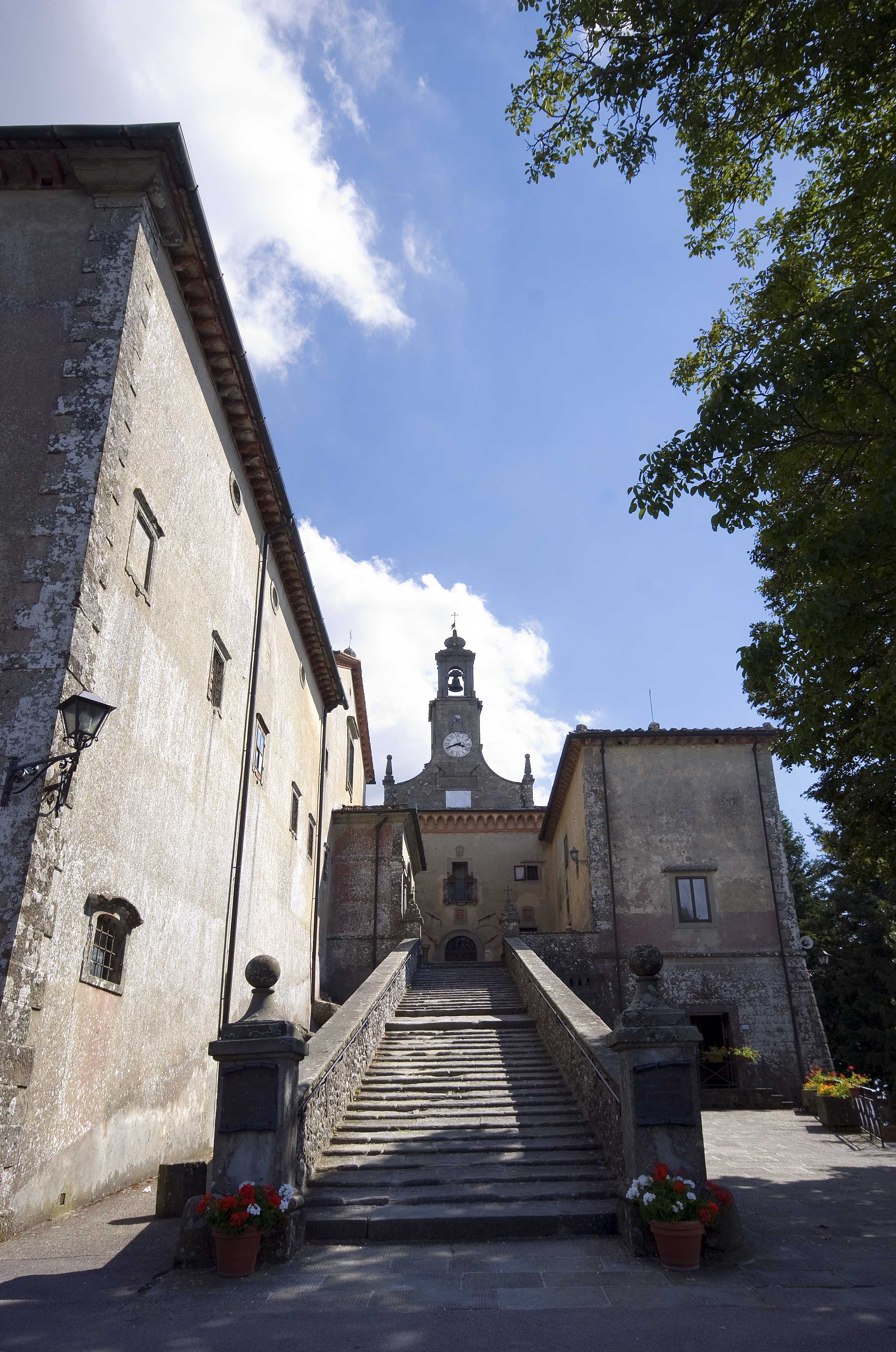
- Sanctuary of Montesenario.

- Coat of arms

- Location within Italy Location within Tuscany
- Coordinates: 43°54′26″N 11°16′54″E
- Country: Italy
- Region: Tuscany
- Metropolitan city: Florence (FI)
- Frazioni: Bivigliano, Caselline, Fontebuona, Montorsoli, Mulinaccio, Paterno, Pratolino, Viliani

Government
  - Mayor: Fabio Pieri

Area
  - Total: 57.0 km^{2} (22.0 sq mi)
- Elevation: 290 m (950 ft)

Population (1 January 2007)
  - Total: 5,073
  - Density: 89.0/km^{2} (231/sq mi)
- Demonym: Vagliesi
- Time zone: UTC+1 (CET)
  - Summer (DST): UTC+2 (CEST)
- Postal code: 50030
- Dialing code: 055
- Patron saint: St. Peter
- Saint day: 29 June
- Website: Official website

Vaglia is a comune (municipality) in the Metropolitan City of Florence in the Italian region Tuscany, located about 15 kilometres (9 mi) north of Florence.

It is home to Villa Demidoff, housing the remains of the Villa Medici di Pratolino. The communal territory also includes the Sanctuary of Montesenario, one of the most important ones in Tuscany.
