= Dicomano =

- Comune
- Comune di Dicomano
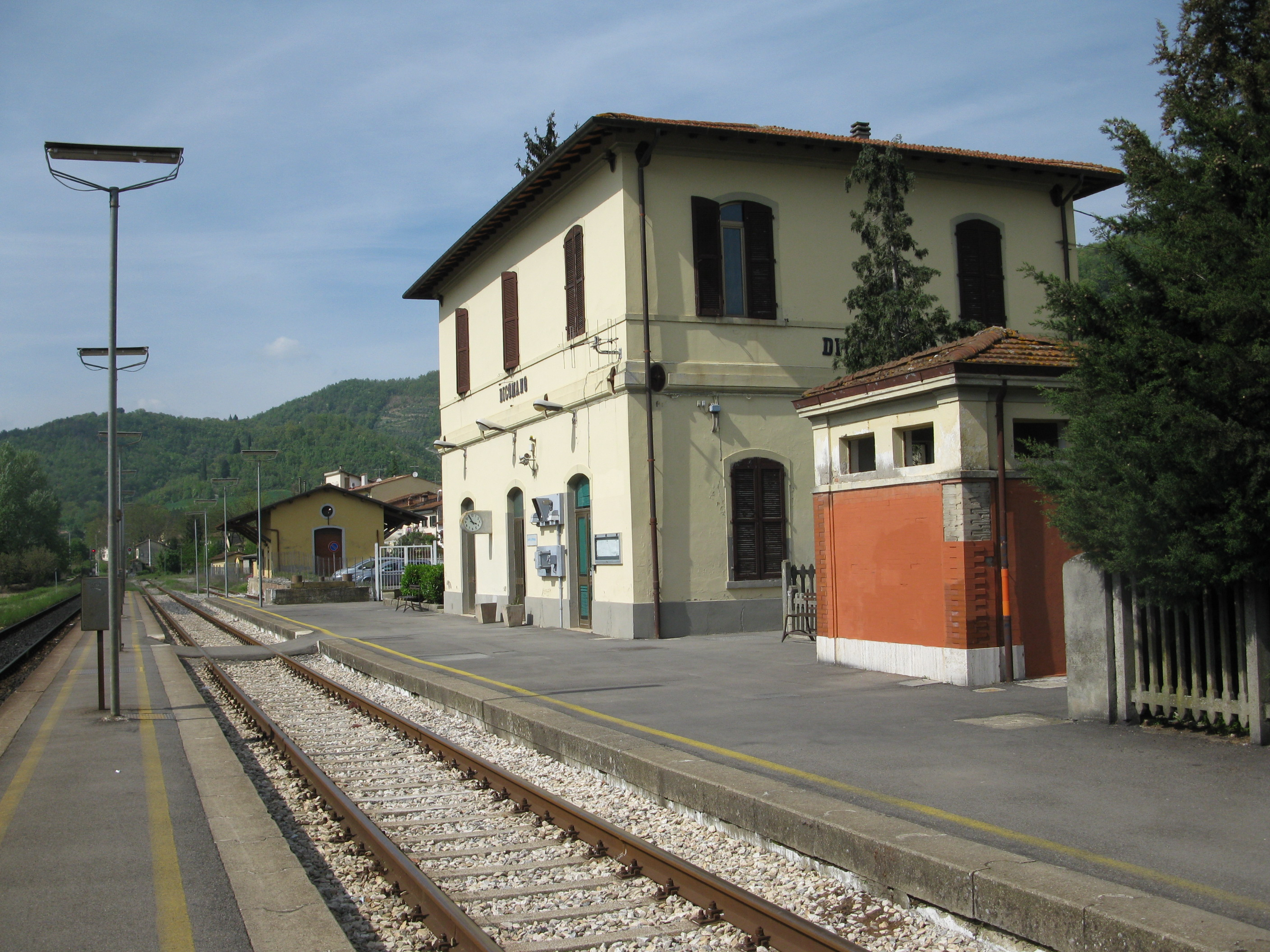
- Dicomano railway station

- Coat of arms

- Location within Italy Location within Tuscany
- Coordinates: 43°54′N 11°32′E
- Country: Italy
- Region: Tuscany
- Metropolitan city: Florence (FI)
- Frazioni: Celle, Corella, Frascole, Contea

Government
  - Mayor: Ida Ciucchi

Area
  - Total: 61.7 km^{2} (23.8 sq mi)
- Elevation: 162 m (531 ft)

Population (31 August 2007)
  - Total: 5,503
  - Density: 89.2/km^{2} (231/sq mi)
- Demonym: Dicomanesi
- Time zone: UTC+1 (CET)
  - Summer (DST): UTC+2 (CEST)
- Postal code: 50062
- Dialing code: 055
- Website: Official website

Dicomano is a comune (municipality) in the Metropolitan City of Florence in the Italian region Tuscany, located about 25 kilometres (16 mi) northeast of Florence.

Dicomano borders the following municipalities: Londa, Rufina, San Godenzo, Vicchio.
