= Metropolitan City of Florence =

Coordinates: 43.7714°N 11.2542°E

Metropolitan City of Florence Città metropolitana di Firenze (Italian)
- Metropolitan city
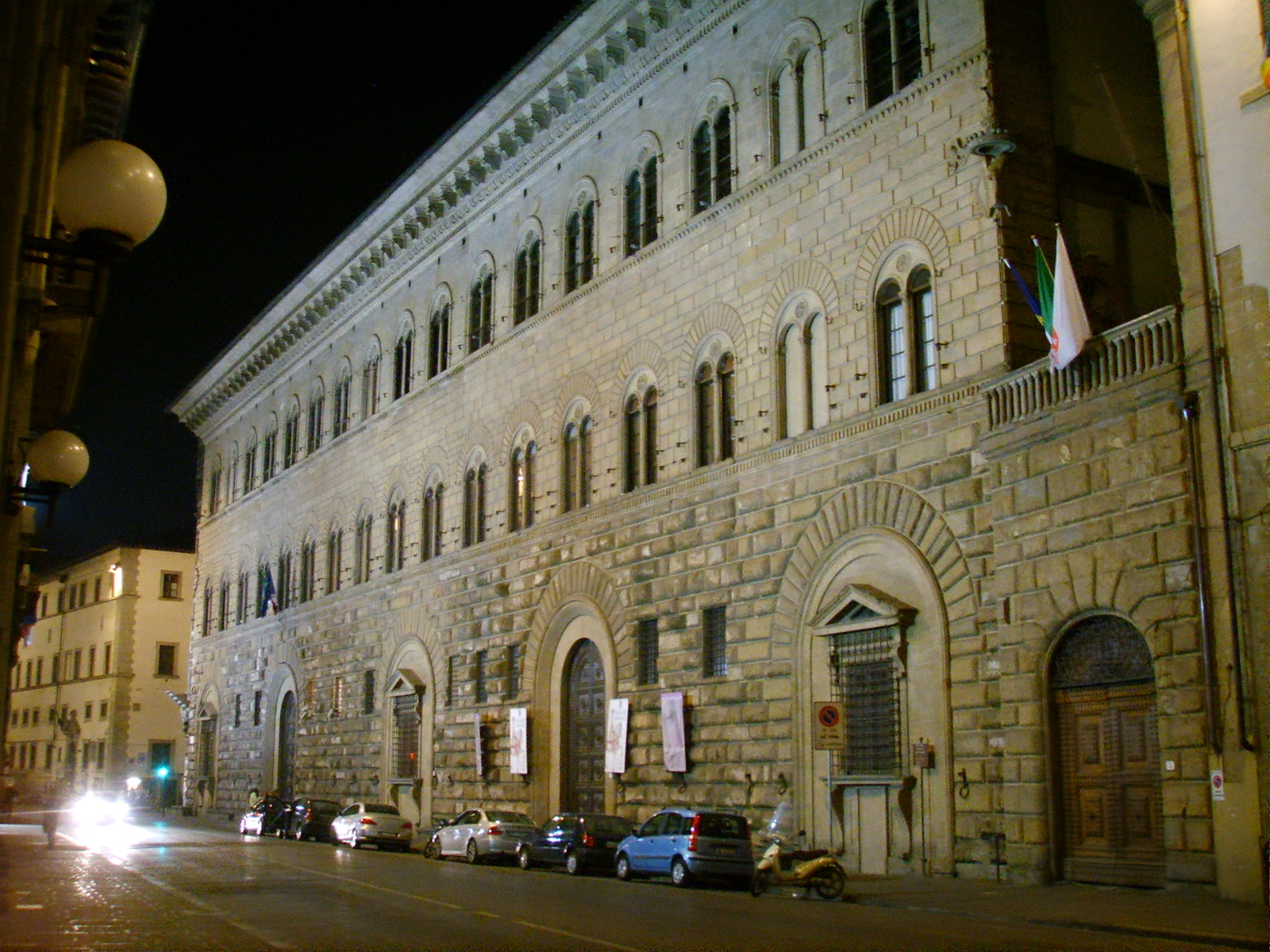
- Palazzo Medici Riccardi, the Metropolitan City seat

- Flag Coat of arms

- Location of the Metropolitan City of Florence in Italy
- Country: Italy
- Region: Tuscany
- Created: 1 January 2015
- Capital(s): Florence
- Municipalities: 41

Government
  - Metropolitan mayor: Sara Funaro (PD)

Area
  - Total: 3,513.69 km^{2} (1,356.64 sq mi)

Population (2026)
  - Total: 988,494
  - Density: 281.326/km^{2} (728.632/sq mi)

GDP
  - Metro: €36.097 billion (2015)
  - Per capita: €35,642 (2015)
- Time zone: UTC+1 (CET)
  - Summer (DST): UTC+2 (CEST)
- Postal code: 50100
- Telephone prefix: 055, 0571
- Vehicle registration: FI
- ISTAT code: 248
- Website: cittametropolitana.fi.it

The Metropolitan City of Florence (Italian: città metropolitana di Firenze) is a metropolitan city in the region of Tuscany in Italy. Its capital is the city of Florence. It was first created by the reform of local authorities (Law 142/1990) and then established by the Law 56/2014, replacing the province of Florence, and has been operative since 1 January 2015.

It has a population of 988,494 in an area of 3,513.69 square kilometres (1,356.64 sq mi) across its 41 municipalities.

== Geography ==
The Metropolitan City of Florence is bordered by the Metropolitan City of Bologna in the north, the province of Ravenna and Forlì-Cesena in the north-east, the province of Prato, Pistoia and Lucca in the north-west, the province of Pisa in the west, the province of Siena in the south and the province of Arezzo in the east and southeast.

Much of its territory lies in the plain of the Arno river and has thus become an exurban sprawl around the city of Florence. The northeastern part of the metropolitan city, in the Apennines, remains less developed. Romagna Granducale is the name given to the region lying on the northern slopes of Apennines. Corn, wine and silk are the chief products in the valley regions. Silk manufacturing was an important industry in the medieval times. Renaissance polymath Leonardo da Vinci was born in the village of Anchiano, which is a part of the Metropolitan City of Florence. The capital Florence is a well known cultural and a large tourist centre.

== Government ==
=== List of metropolitan mayors ===
	Metropolitan Mayor	Term start	Term end	Party
1	Dario Nardella	1 January 2015	26 June 2024	PD
2	Sara Funaro	26 June 2024	In office	PD

=== Municipalities ===
The metropolitan city has 41 municipalities:

- Bagno a Ripoli
- Barberino di Mugello
- Barberino Tavarnelle
- Borgo San Lorenzo
- Calenzano
- Campi Bisenzio
- Capraia e Limite
- Castelfiorentino
- Cerreto Guidi
- Certaldo
- Dicomano
- Empoli
- Fiesole
- Figline e Incisa Valdarno
- Firenzuola
- Florence
- Fucecchio
- Gambassi Terme
- Greve in Chianti
- Impruneta
- Lastra a Signa
- Londa
- Marradi
- Montaione
- Montelupo Fiorentino
- Montespertoli
- Palazzuolo sul Senio
- Pelago
- Pontassieve
- Reggello
- Rignano sull'Arno
- Rufina
- San Casciano in Val di Pesa
- San Godenzo
- Scandicci
- Scarperia
- Sesto Fiorentino
- Signa
- Vaglia
- Vicchio
- Vinci

== Demographics ==
As of 2026, the population is 988,494, of which 48.4% are male, and 51.6% are female. Minors make up 13.8% of the population, and seniors make up 26.6%.

Historical population

Year	Pop.	±%
1861	454,645	—
1871	531,427	+16.9%
1881	537,259	+1.1%
1901	632,657	+17.8%
1911	675,681	+6.8%
1921	703,351	+4.1%
1931	736,650	+4.7%
1936	753,901	+2.3%

Year	Pop.	±%
1951	804,541	+6.7%
1961	867,000	+7.8%
1971	964,761	+11.3%
1981	995,639	+3.2%
1991	967,437	−2.8%
2001	933,860	−3.5%
2011	973,145	+4.2%
2021	987,260	+1.5%

Source: ISTAT

=== Immigration ===
As of 2025, immigrants make up 16.1% of the total population. The 5 largest foreign countries of birth are Albania, China, Romania, Peru, and Morocco.

== Economy ==
Wholesale and retail is the largest sector in the Metropolitan City: As of 2008, almost 29% of the firms in the former province of Florence were involved in it. Manufacturing, construction, real estate and agriculture are the next important ones with a percentage share of about 19.5%, 14%, 13.6% and 8% respectively.

Tourism is also an important industry. Empoli is known for its ancient glass-making industry.

== Main sights ==
The Metropolitan City receives large number of tourists every year.

The capital city Florence has been recognised as UNESCO World Heritage Site. Some major tourist attractions of the city are Piazza del Duomo, Duomo of Santa Maria del Fiore, the Baptistery of San Giovanni, Giotto's Bell Tower, the Loggia del Bigallo and Museo dell'Opera di Santa Maria del Fiore, Ponte Vecchio along with many others.

Sights in Barberino di Mugello include Cattani Castle and Palazzo Pretorio. The Certosa del Galluzzo houses artworks by Pontormo. Giovanni Boccaccio's hometown Certaldo is home to the Palazzo Pretorio and Boccaccio's House, while Vinci, birthplace of Leonardo da Vinci, houses a museum dedicated to the Italian polymath. Sesto Fiorentino is known for the Etruscan tomb "La Montagnola".

== See also ==
- Province of Florence
