= Pratovecchio =

- Frazione
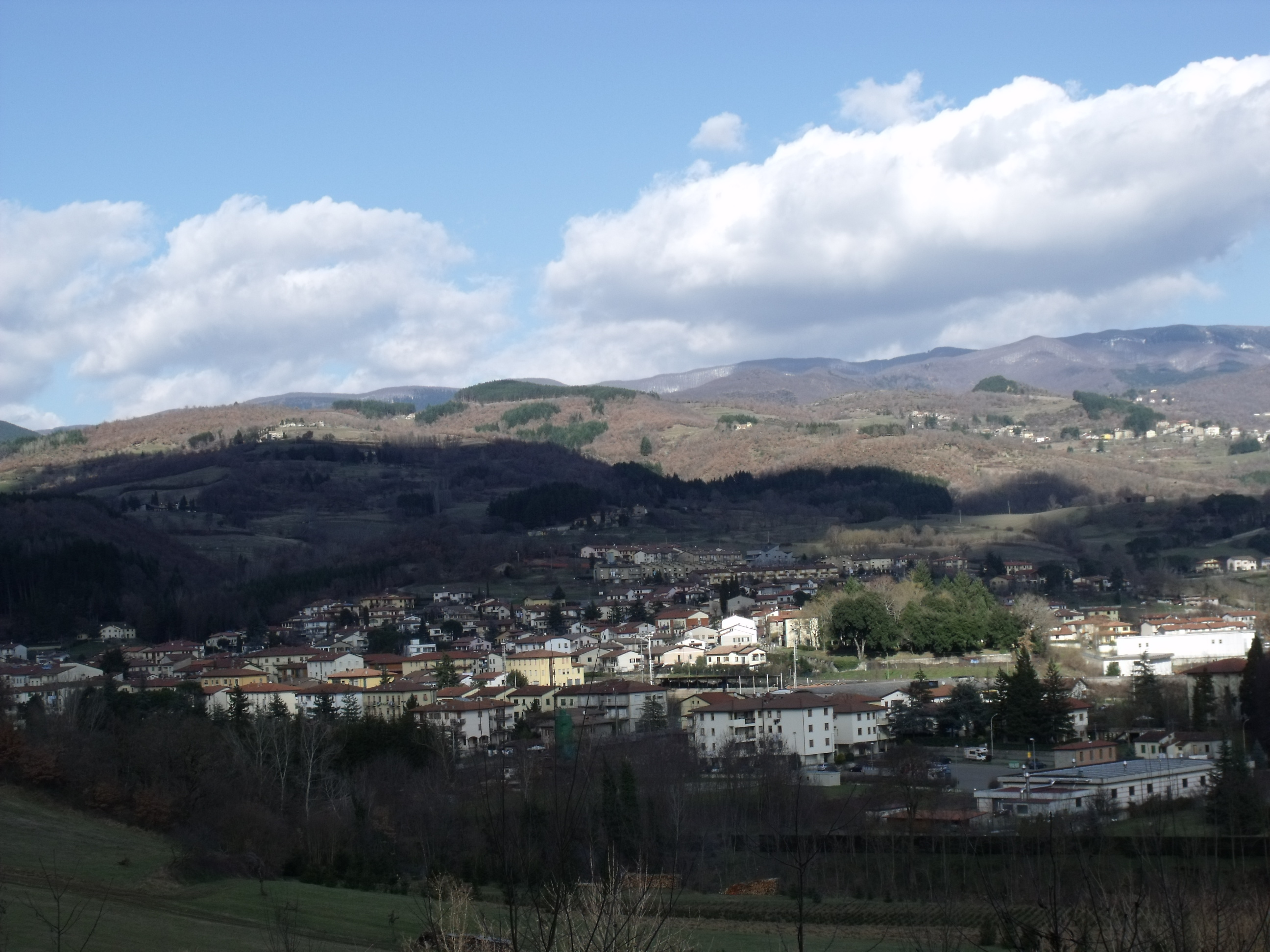

- Location of Pratovecchio in Italy
- Coordinates: 43°47′16″N 11°43′28″E
- Country: Italy
- Region: Tuscany
- Province: Arezzo (AR)
- Comune: Pratovecchio Stia
- Elevation: 420 m (1,380 ft)

Population (2011)
  - Total: 2,154
- Demonym: Pratovecchini
- Time zone: UTC+1 (CET)
  - Summer (DST): UTC+2 (CEST)
- Postal code: 52015
- Dialing code: 0575

Pratovecchio is a town and frazione of the municipality of Pratovecchio Stia in the province of Arezzo, Tuscany, Italy.

It was an independent municipality until it merged with Stia in 2014.

== Main sights ==
- Church of Santissimo Nome di Gesù
- Monastery of Santa Maria della Neve
- Monastery and church of San Giovanni Evangelista (1134). Renovated in the 17th century, it has a Baroque portal and a single nave. Artworks include an Coronation of the Virgin by Giovanni Bizzelli (1600) and an Assumption by the Master of Pratovecchio (mid-15th century).
