= List of municipalities of the Province of Forlì-Cesena =

This is a list of the 30 municipalities (comuni) of the Province of Forlì-Cesena in the region of Emilia-Romagna in Italy.

== List ==
Municipality	Population (2026)	Area (km²)	Density
Bagno di Romagna	5,584	233.52	23.9
Bertinoro	11,193	57.25	195.5
Borghi	2,915	30.23	96.4
Castrocaro Terme e Terra del Sole	6,530	38.95	167.7
Cesena	95,620	249.47	383.3
Cesenatico	26,042	45.16	576.7
Civitella di Romagna	3,626	117.93	30.7
Dovadola	1,591	38.97	40.8
Forlì	118,053	228.20	517.3
Forlimpopoli	13,140	24.46	537.2
Galeata	2,556	63.13	40.5
Gambettola	10,963	7.77	1,410.9
Gatteo	9,469	14.14	669.7
Longiano	7,194	23.58	305.1
Meldola	10,037	79.08	126.9
Mercato Saraceno	6,826	99.33	68.7
Modigliana	4,301	101.17	42.5
Montiano	1,695	9.26	183.0
Portico e San Benedetto	716	61.05	11.7
Predappio	6,364	91.39	69.6
Premilcuore	675	98.56	6.8
Rocca San Casciano	1,823	50.56	36.1
Roncofreddo	3,558	51.53	69.0
San Mauro Pascoli	12,458	17.29	720.5
Santa Sofia	4,033	148.87	27.1
Sarsina	3,287	100.72	32.6
Savignano sul Rubicone	18,147	23.30	778.8
Sogliano al Rubicone	3,145	93.43	33.7
Tredozio	1,075	62.20	17.3
Verghereto	1,721	117.90	14.6

== See also ==
- List of municipalities of Emilia-Romagna
- List of municipalities of Italy
