= Montone (river) =

Coordinates: 44.3965°N 12.2006°E

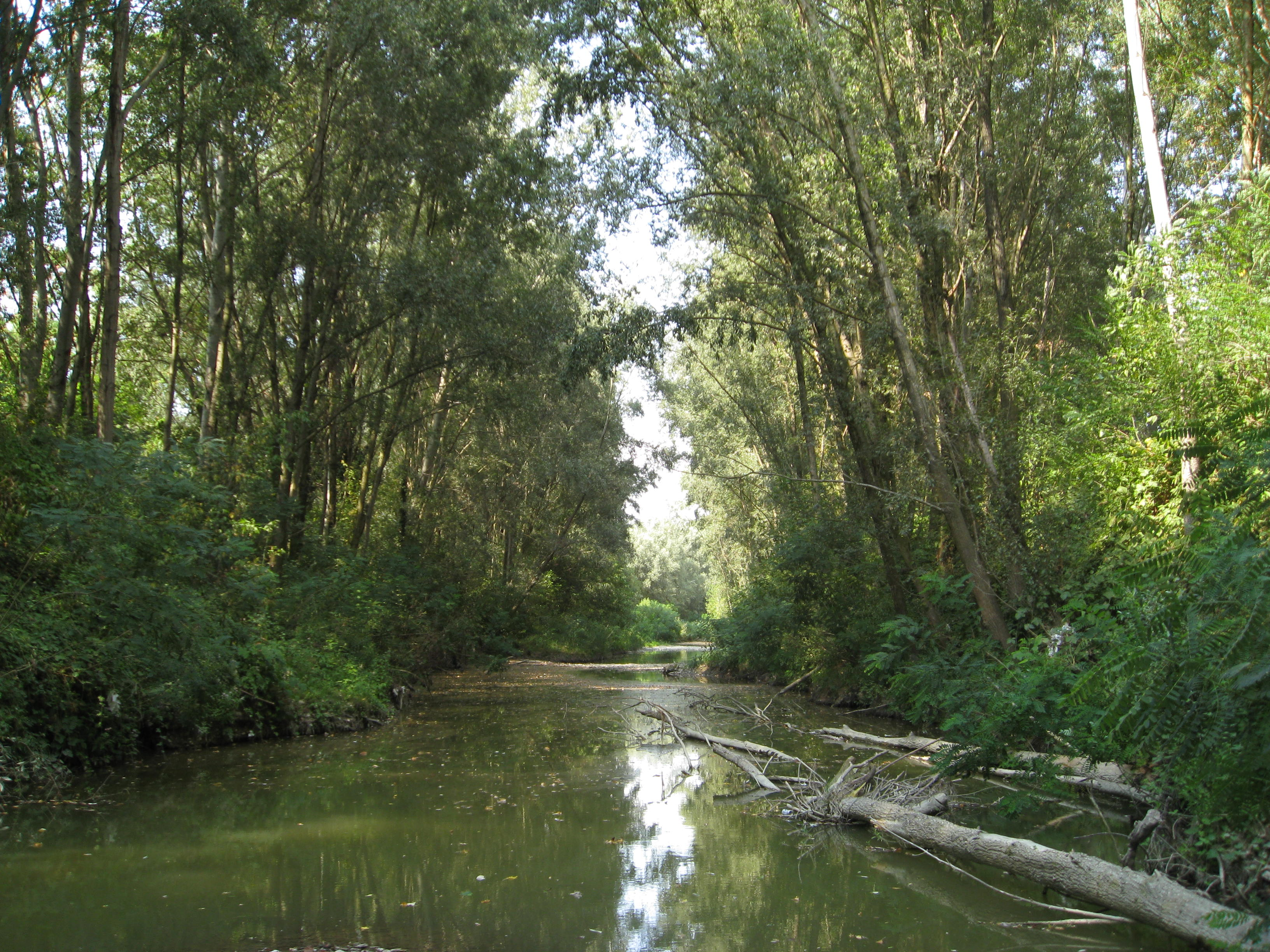
- The Montone at Forlì

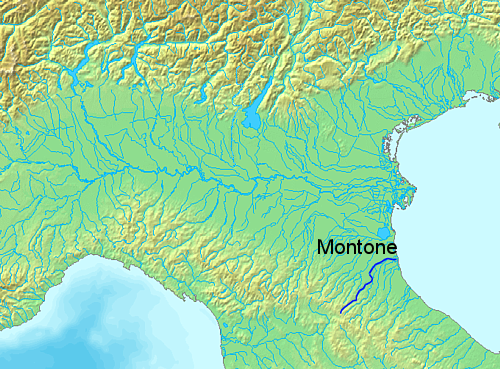

Location
- Country: Italy

Physical characteristics
- Source
  - location: Tuscan-Emilian Apennine mountains in the Metropolitan City of Florence
  - elevation: 900 m (3,000 ft)
- Mouth: Fiumi Uniti
- Length: 90 km (56 mi)
- Discharge
  - average: 5 m^{3}/s (180 cu ft/s)

Basin features
- Progression: Fiumi Uniti→ Adriatic Sea

The Montone is a river in the historical region of Romagna, which is in the present-day region of Emilia-Romagna in northern Italy. It is the northernmost river on the east-facing slopes of the Apennines to flow directly into the Adriatic Sea rather than entering the Po. Its Latin name was Utens, Utis or Vitis.

The source of the river is in the Foreste Casentinesi, Monte Falterona, Campigna National Park in the Tuscan-Emilian Apennine mountains in the Metropolitan City of Florence (which is in the Tuscany region of Italy). The river flows northeast and crosses the border into the province of Forlì-Cesena and passes through the localities of San Benedetto in Alpe, Portico di Romagna, Bocconi, Rocca San Casciano, Dovadola, Castrocaro, Terra del Sole and Forlì. Near Forlì, the river receives the waters of the Rabbi and curves northwest. It then flows northeast again and forms the border between the province of Forlì-Cesena and the province of Ravenna before flowing into the province of Ravenna. The river curves eastward and is joined by the Bidente-Ronco south of Ravenna. The combined rivers are known as the Uniti.

The Battle of Ravenna was fought near the confluence with the Ronco in 1512. Also famous is the Acquacheta stream, mentioned by Dante Alighieri in his Divine Comedy.
