= Rabbi (river) =

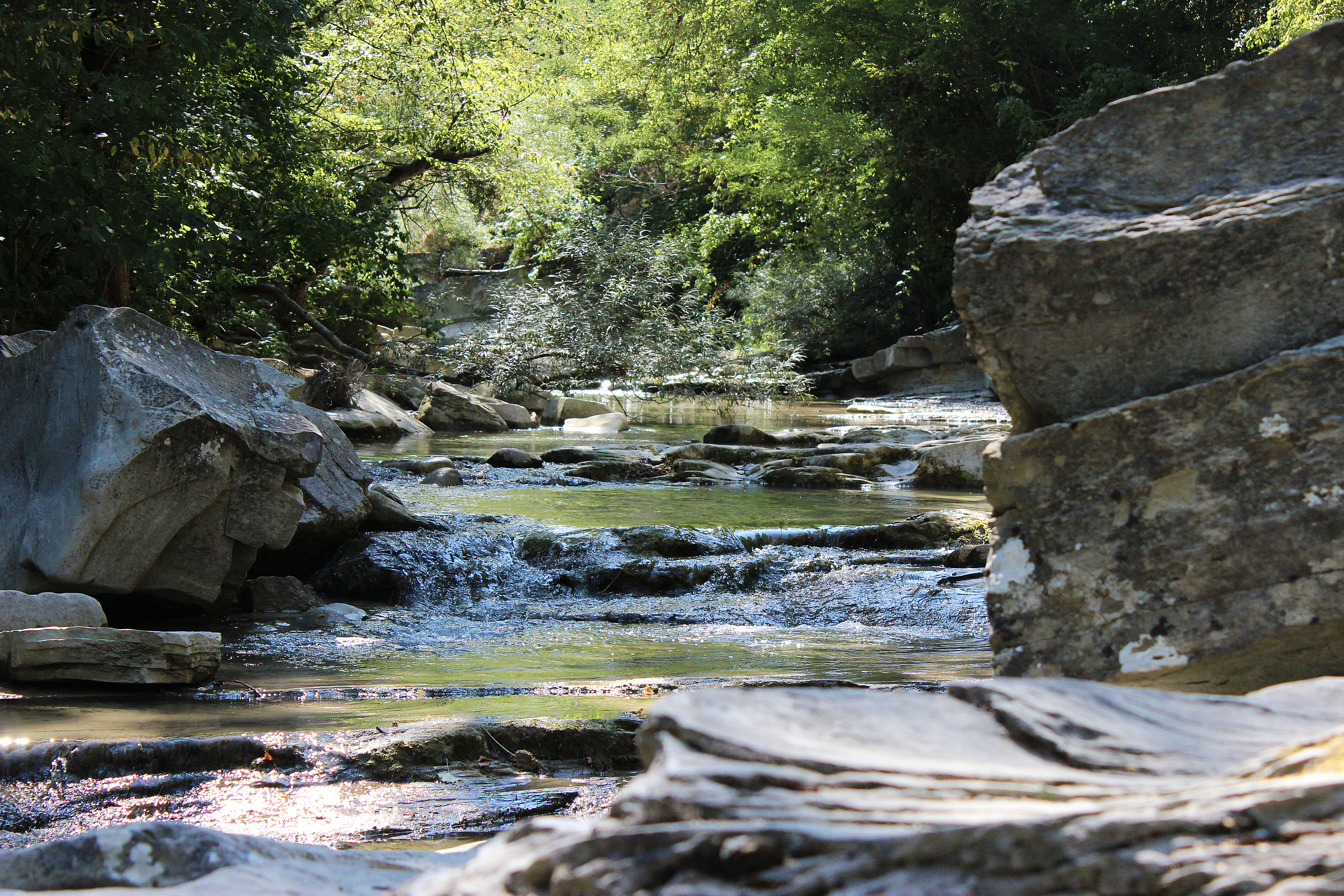
- The Rabbi near Premilcuore

Location
- Country: Italy

Physical characteristics
- Source
  - location: Appennino Tosco-Emiliano mountains in the Province of Florence
  - elevation: 1,654 m (5,427 ft)
- Mouth: Montone
  - coordinates: 44.2114°N 12.0272°E
- Length: 63 km (39 mi)
- Discharge
  - average: 2.5 m^{3}/s (88 cu ft/s)

Basin features
- Progression: Montone→ Fiumi Uniti→ Adriatic Sea

The Rabbi is a river in the Tuscany and Emilia-Romagna regions of Italy. The source of the river is in the Foreste Casentinesi, Monte Falterona, Campigna National Park in the Appennino Tosco-Emiliano mountains in the province of Florence. The river crosses the border into the province of Forlì-Cesena and flows northeast near Premilcuore and Predappio before joining the Montone near Forlì.
