= Bidente-Ronco =

Coordinates: 44.3965°N 12.2006°E

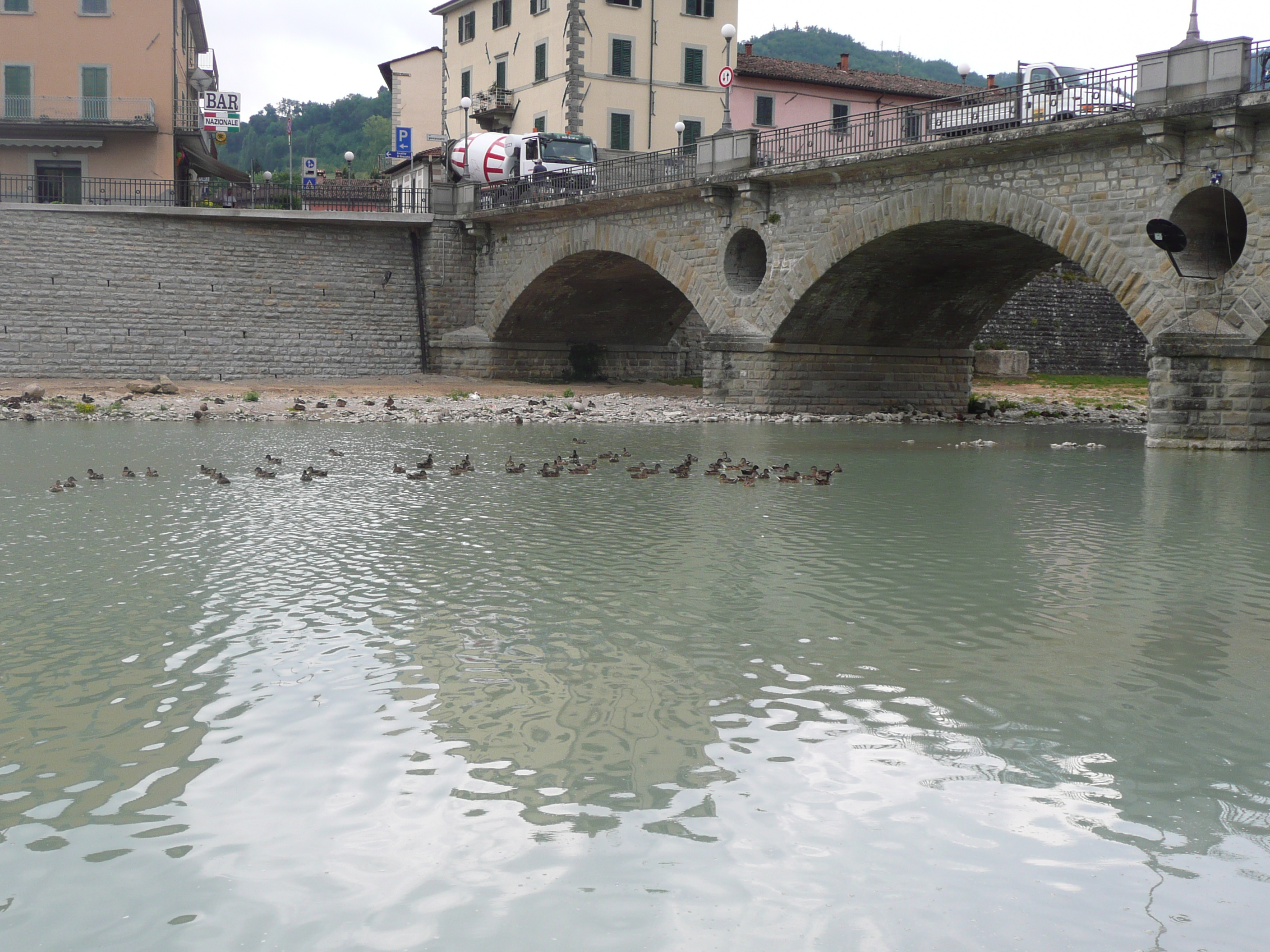
- The Ponte Vecchio over the Bidente-Ronco at Santa Sofia

Location
- Country: Italy

Physical characteristics
- Source
  - location: near the border between the Province of Forlì-Cesena, Province of Arezzo, and Province of Florence
  - elevation: 1,654 m (5,427 ft)
- Mouth: Fiumi Uniti
- Discharge
  - average: 3.5 m^{3}/s (120 cu ft/s)

Basin features
- Progression: Fiumi Uniti→ Adriatic Sea

The Bidente-Ronco is a river in the Emilia-Romagna region of Italy. The first portion of the river is called the Bidente. Once the river passes under the Ponte dei Veneziani (Bridge of the Venetians) in Meldola, the river is called the Ronco. The source of the river is near the border between the province of Forlì-Cesena, the province of Arezzo, and the province of Florence in the Foreste Casentinesi, Monte Falterona, Campigna National Park. The river flows northeast through the mountains in the province of Forlì-Cesena and flows near Santa Sofia, Galeata, Civitella di Romagna and Meldola. Beyond Meldola, the river flows north near Bertinoro, Forlimpopoli, and Forlì before crossing the border into the province of Ravenna. The river flows northeast until it joins the Montone south of Ravenna, and the resulting river is known as the Uniti. The Battle of Ronco took place here.
