= Acquacheta =

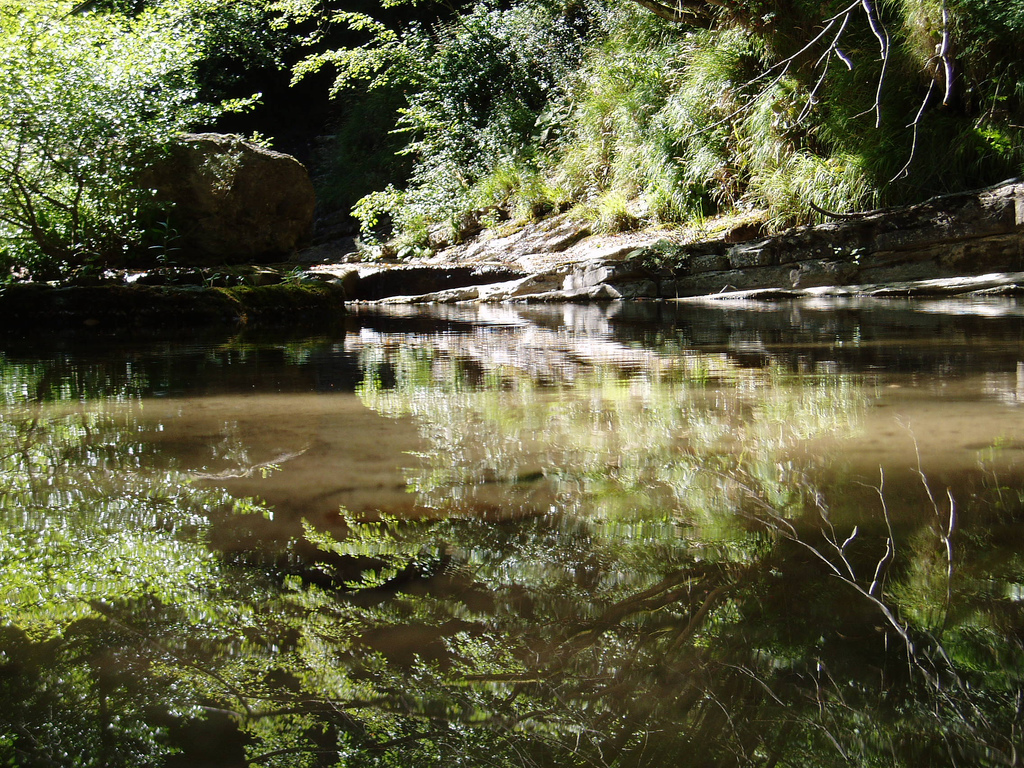

Location
- Country: Italy

Physical characteristics
- Mouth: Montone
  - coordinates: 43.9818°N 11.6889°E

Basin features
- Progression: Montone→ Fiumi Uniti→ Adriatic Sea

The Acquacheta is a stream in the province of Forlì-Cesena, Romagna, northern Italy. An affluent of the Montone in San Benedetto in Alpe, it is famous because it was mentioned by Dante Alighieri in his Divine Comedy (Inferno, XVI, 94–102).

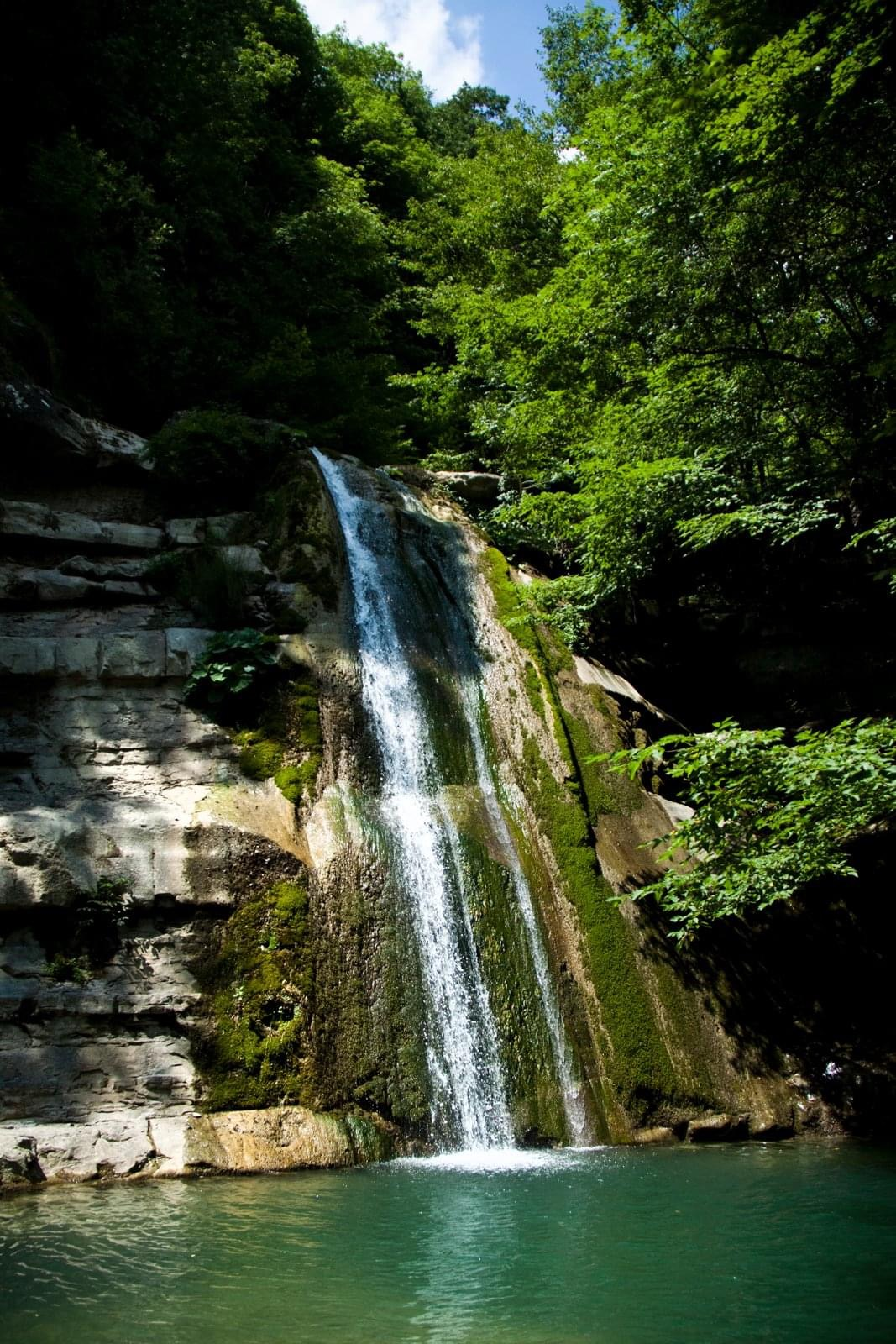
Waterfall of Acquacheta within the National Park of Casentinesi Forests

The waterfall is a renowned attraction of the Foreste Casentinesi, Monte Falterona e Campigna National Park.

== See also ==
- Conservation in Italy
