= Military districts of Italy =

Territorial recruitment and administrative units of the Italian Army (1870–2005)

Map of the military subdivisions of Italy in 1883

Military Districts of Italy (Italian: distretti militari) were territorial commands of the Italian Army tasked with overseeing recruitment, conscription, and administrative functions from their inception in 1870 until their replacement in 2005.

Originally intended to replace the provincial and garrison commands of the pre-unification states, these districts became central to Italy’s conscription system and the local mobilization of manpower throughout the Kingdom of Italy and the Italian Republic.

== Origins and Early Structure ==
The establishment of military districts in 1870 was part of a broader reform aimed at unifying and streamlining Italy’s military administration. Initially, 45 districts were formed, each led by a dedicated District Command. These commands were responsible for conscription operations, administrative processing of recruits, and mobilization planning. Each district typically included a recruitment office and an administrative bureau, along with a detachment of troops for preliminary training.

Military service for new conscripts began at the local district level, where they received their initial military instruction before being assigned to regular army units. By 1897, a permanent officer cadre was also established to support district operations.

== Expansion and Reforms (1871–1940) ==
Between 1871 and 1897, the number of military districts grew to 62 and eventually to 88 as the population and administrative needs expanded. The 1910 reform attempted to narrow their scope exclusively to recruitment tasks, transferring other duties to newly established army offices. However, the outbreak of the First World War prevented full implementation.

Postwar reorganizations restored and expanded the role of districts. In 1920, a total of 106 District Commands were operational. Their responsibilities now included not only recruitment but also mobilization coordination and training logistics. A classification system introduced in 1926 divided districts into five categories, with Rome occupying the highest tier (Category I), followed by Florence, Milan, and Turin.

By 1940, 116 military districts were active. That year also saw reforms in the conscription system, detailing responsibilities of district commands, provincial draft boards, and mobile recruitment commissions.

== Post-War Developments ==
Following the Second World War, military districts remained the core mechanism for managing compulsory military service. Their functions extended to record-keeping and issuing military documentation (known as the matricular system). They continued to serve as the primary interface between the military and the public regarding conscription matters.

In 1964, a reorganization reduced the number of districts to 66. This number continued to decline in the subsequent decades, reflecting changes in the size and structure of the armed forces.

== Decline and Abolishment ==
With the professionalization of the Italian Army and the end of mandatory military service in the early 2000s, the traditional role of military districts became obsolete. In 2000, district commands were placed under the authority of regional RFC (Reclutamento Forze di Completamento) Commands within the Army's recruitment inspectorate.

The definitive reform came with the suspension of conscription, legislated by Law No. 331 of 14 November 2000. By 2005, military districts had been formally disbanded. Their functions were transferred to newly established Centro documentale (Army Documentation Centers), responsible for the archival maintenance of conscription records and the provision of certification services. Some residual public information units (NIP – Nuclei Informativi al Pubblico) remained active in provincial capitals for a few years before also being phased out.

== List of Military Districts in 1870 ==
The following table lists the 45 military districts as they were organized in 1870, along with the provinces included in each:

Military District	Provinces Included
1st Military District of Alessandria	Alessandria
2nd Military District of Piacenza	Pavia, Piacenza
3rd Military District of Bari	Bari
4th Military District of Foggia	Campobasso, Foggia
5th Military District of Lecce	Lecce
6th Military District of Bologna	Bologna, Ferrara
7th Military District of Parma	Modena, Parma, Reggio (Emilia)
8th Military District of Ravenna	Forlì, Ravenna
9th Military District of Chieti	Aquila, Chieti
10th Military District of Teramo	Ascoli, Teramo
11th Military District of Florence	Arezzo, Firenze
12th Military District of Siena	Grosseto, Siena
13th Military District of Livorno	Livorno, Pisa
14th Military District of Lucca	Massa Carrara, Lucca
15th Military District of Cagliari	Cagliari
16th Military District of Genoa	Genova, Porto Maurizio
17th Military District of Sassari	Sassari
18th Military District of Catania	Catania
19th Military District of Catanzaro	Catanzaro
20th Military District of Messina	Messina
21st Military District of Reggio Calabria	Reggio (Calabria)
22nd Military District of Como	Como, Sondrio
23rd Military District of Milan	Milano
24th Military District of Novara	Novara
25th Military District of Benevento	Avellino, Benevento
26th Military District of Caserta	Caserta
27th Military District of Naples	Napoli
28th Military District of Treviso	Belluno, Treviso
29th Military District of Padua	Padova, Rovigo, Venezia
30th Military District of Udine	Udine
31st Military District of Caltanissetta	Caltanissetta, Siracusa
32nd Military District of Trapani	Girgenti, Trapani
33rd Military District of Palermo	Palermo
34th Military District of Ancona	Ancona, Macerata, Pesaro e Urbino
35th Military District of Perugia	Perugia
36th Military District of Rome	Roma
37th Military District of Cosenza	Cosenza
38th Military District of Potenza	Potenza
39th Military District of Salerno	Salerno
40th Military District of Cuneo	Cuneo
41st Military District of Turin	Torino
42nd Military District of Bergamo	Bergamo
43rd Military District of Brescia	Brescia
44th Military District of Cremona	Cremona, Mantova
45th Military District of Verona	Verona, Vicenza

== See also ==
- Military history of Italy
