= Premilcuore =

- Comune
- Comune di Premilcuore
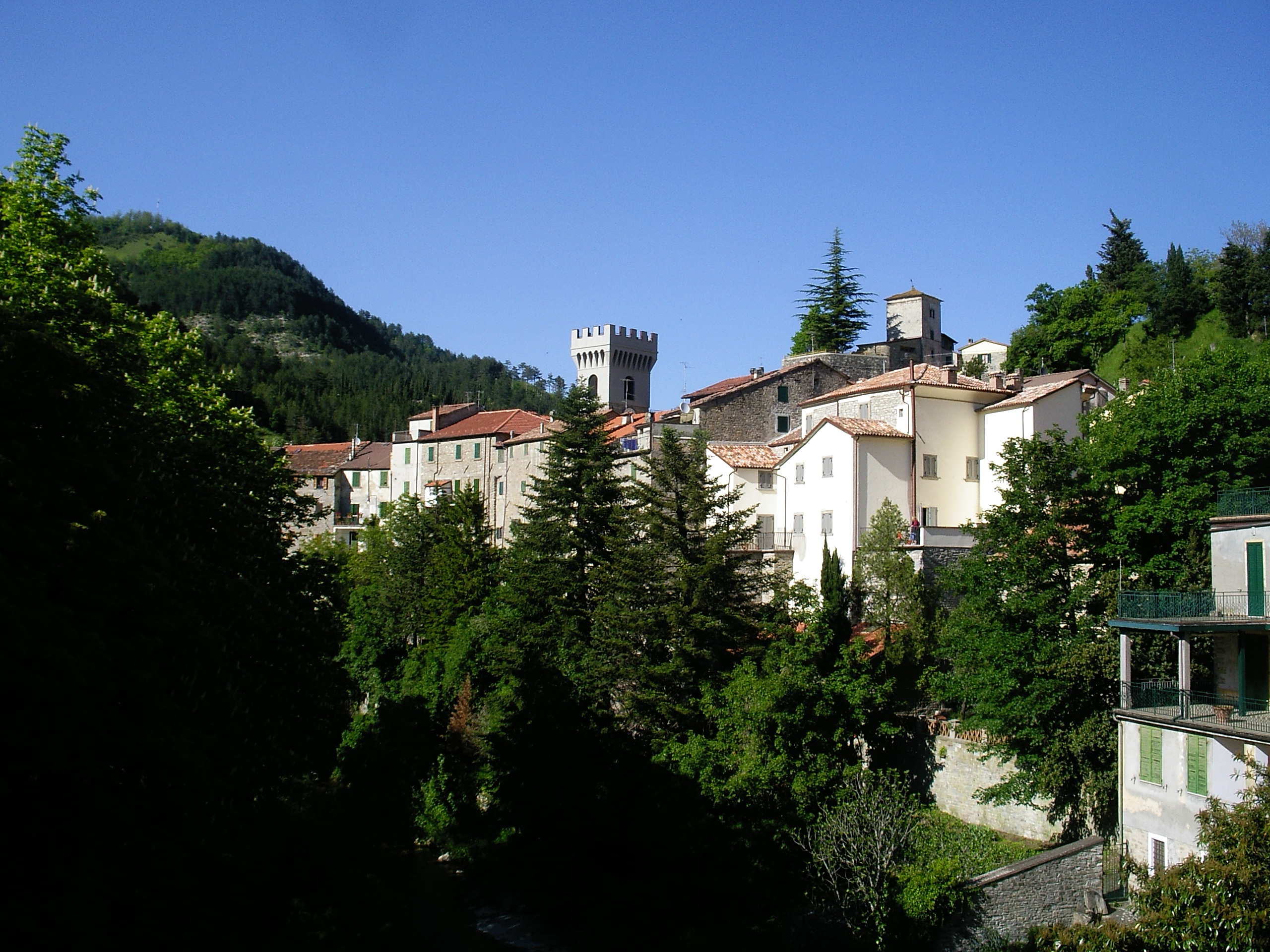
- View of Premilcuore

- Coat of arms

- Premilcuore within the Province of Forlì-Cesena

- Location within Italy Location within Emilia-Romagna
- Coordinates: 43°59′N 11°47′E
- Country: Italy
- Region: Emilia-Romagna
- Province: Forlì-Cesena (FC)
- Frazioni: Ponte Fantella

Government
  - Mayor: Ursula Valmori

Area
  - Total: 98.8 km^{2} (38.1 sq mi)
- Elevation: 459 m (1,506 ft)

Population (2011)
  - Total: 803
  - Density: 8.13/km^{2} (21.1/sq mi)
- Demonym: Premilcuoresi
- Time zone: UTC+1 (CET)
  - Summer (DST): UTC+2 (CEST)
- Postal code: 47010
- Dialing code: 0543
- Website: Official website

Premilcuore (Romagnol: Premaicur) is a comune (municipality) in the Province of Forlì-Cesena in the Italian region Emilia-Romagna, located about 70 kilometres (43 mi) southeast of Bologna and about 35 kilometres (22 mi) southwest of Forlì.

== History ==
Following a local tradition, the town was founded in the year 215 by a Roman centurion named "Marcelliano", who took refuge with some soldiers in the valley of Rabbi river. First mentioned in 1124, it was part of the Province of Florence, in Tuscany, until 1923.

== Geography ==
Located at the borders of Romagna with Tuscany, Premilcuore is a little hill town of the Apennine Mountains, below the Alpe di San Benedetto and Falterona mountains. It borders the municipalities of Galeata, Portico e San Benedetto, Rocca San Casciano, San Godenzo (FI), and Santa Sofia. It counts the hamlet (frazione) of Ponte Fantella.

== Main sights ==
Main sights of Premilcuore include the medieval old town with its fortress (Rocca di Premilcuore), palaces and churches. The town is also part of the Foreste Casentinesi, Monte Falterona, Campigna National Park.

== Personalities ==
- Pietro Leoni (1909–1995), Jesuit priest
