= Hilary of Galeata =

Christian saint (476–558)

Saint Hilary of Galeata
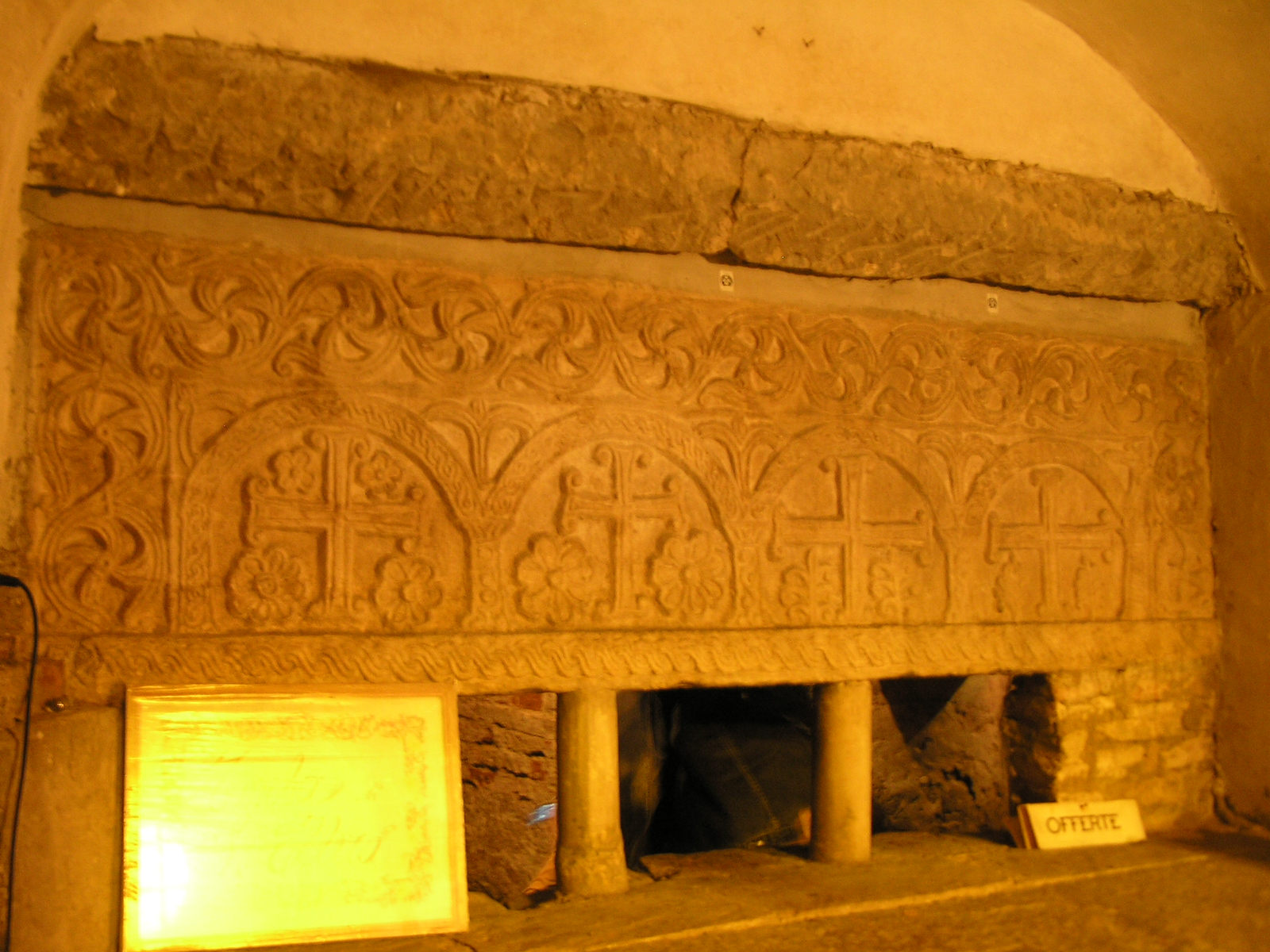
- Hilary's tomb

Venerable Hermit
- Born: 476; Tuscia
- Died: 15 May 558 (aged 81–82); Lugo
- Venerated in: Eastern Orthodox Church; Roman Catholic Church
- Major shrine: Monastery of Sant'Ellero, Galeata
- Feast: 15 May
- Patronage: Lugo; Galeata; invoked against backache

Hilary of Galeata (Italian: Sant'Ilaro, also Sant'Ellero; 476 – 15 May 558) is venerated as a saint in the Eastern Orthodox Church and Roman Catholic Church. His feast day is 15 May.

== Life ==
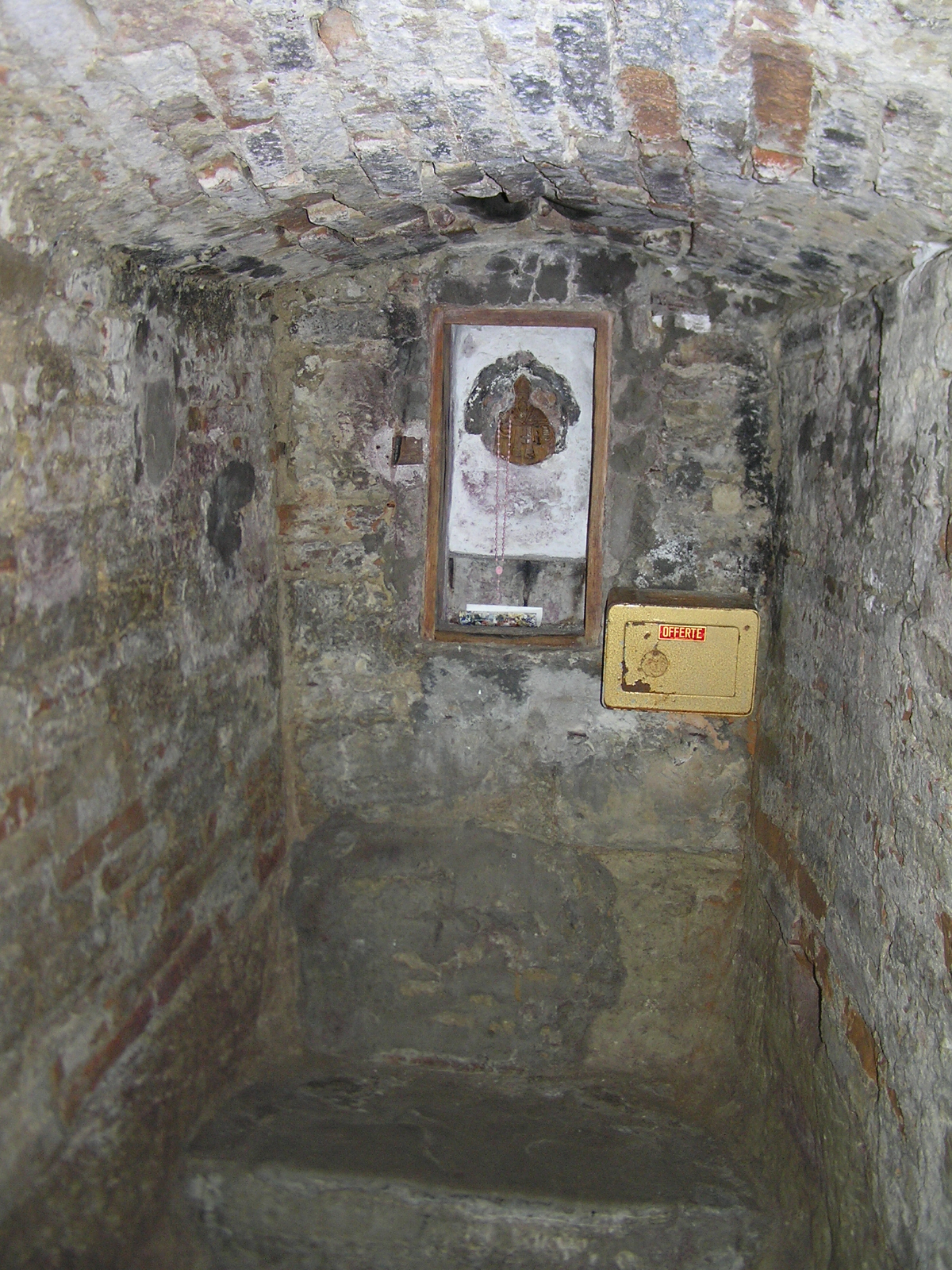
Chair of Saint Hilary, in the cell in which the saint used to pray. The chair was used by devotees of his cult to cure backache.

According to tradition, he was born in Tuscia in 476, and he decided to dedicate himself to the life of a hermit at the age of twelve. He left his home, and traveled across the Apennines towards Emilia and chose a spot pointed out to him by an angel, on a mountain in the valley of the Bidente near the Ronco River. At the age of twenty, he freed a local nobleman, Olibrius, from a demon. In gratitude, Olibrius had his entire family christened by Hilary, and donated to the saint lands and money.

Around 496, then, this became the nucleus of the monastery of Galeata, later called Sant'Ellero di Galeata. The foundation attracted new recruits, and the monastery followed a version of the rule of Saint Pachomius. Numerous miracles are attributed to Hilary. Hilary transformed a grape into a serpent in order to teach a lazy monk named Glicerio a lesson. Hilary also managed to impress Theodoric, who had originally been harassing the monks and who had been building a palace near Galeata, into donating land and goods.

== Veneration ==
The author of Hilary's Vita claims that he is a disciple and eyewitness to the events of the saint's life. Scholars have declared it to be written contemporaneously with the life of Hilary. However, as Giovanni Lucchesi has remarked, the Vita's author followed the normal standards for writing hagiographies in the Middle Ages, which called for the incorporation of miracles, the active participation of angels and demons, and the addition of long, devout speeches and prayers in the text. In addition, Lucchesi points out that the story of Olibrius's liberation from demonic possession is a trope found in other hagiographies of the time (such as those associated with Saints Apollonia, Gordian, Cyriacus, Epiphanius, Potitus, Abercius, Vitus, etc.).

Hilary's following was diffused across Tuscany and Romagna, especially in the dioceses of Arezzo, Sarsina, Forlì, Bertinoro, Faenza, Imola, Modigliana, Fiesole, Florence and at the abbey of Farfa.

In 1488 Sant'Ellero di Galeata became a Camaldolese monastery.

Hilary is the principal patron saint of Lugo, in the Diocese of Imola.
