= Ridracoli =

Frazione of Forlì-Cesena, Italy

Coordinates: 43°50′N 11°58′E

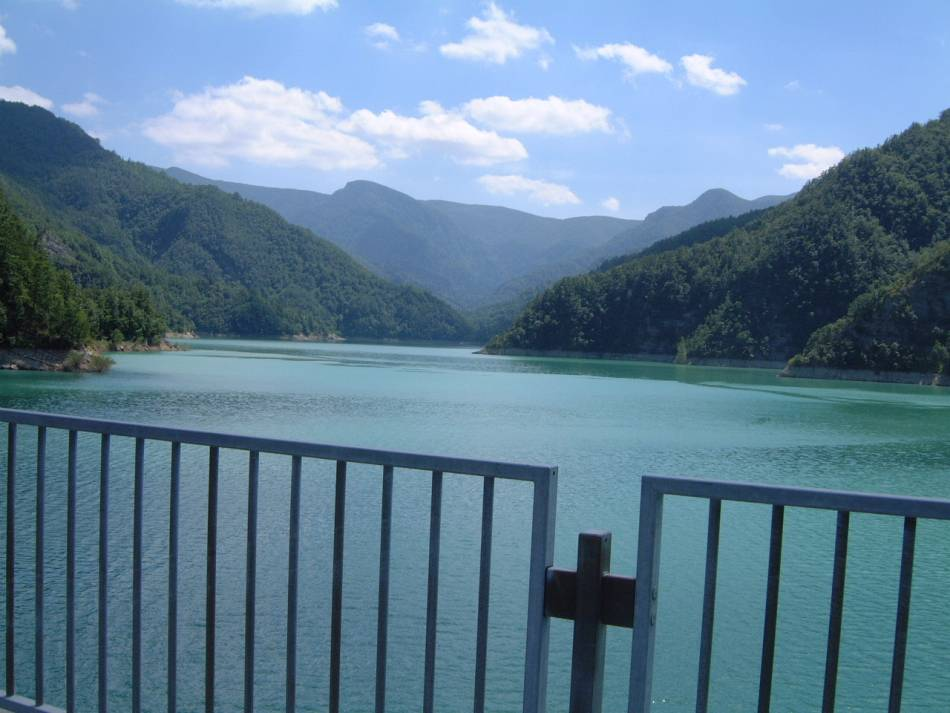
The lake of Ridracoli.

Ridracoli is a frazione of the comune of Bagno di Romagna, province of Forlì-Cesena, Emilia-Romagna (northern Italy).

In the nearby is a 103.5 m-high dam on the Bidente river, with a lake. It is part of the Foreste Casentinesi, Monte Falterona, Campigna National Park.
