= Anello del Rinascimento =

The Anello del Rinascimento (Ring of the Renaissance or Renaissance Ring) is 178 km trekking and mountain biking route that is divided into thirteen stages. The path traces a symbolic route around the city of Florence. The path skirts fields and woods, castles, ancient churches, and monasteries and penetrates to the heart of Florence, Fiesole and other municipalities in the Province of Florence. The epicentre of the route is the Florence Cathedral.
