= Torquato Nanni =

Italian socialist

Torquato Nanni (4 February 1888 – 22 April 1945) was an Italian socialist politician and writer.

== Biography ==
As a young man, Nanni was a close friend of Benito Mussolini, with whom he maintained correspondence. He was the author of the first biography of Mussolini, which was published in mid-February 1915 in the editions of La Voce by Giuseppe Prezzolini. Nanni was a lawyer, and in March 1912 he was the first person from the Italian Socialist Party to be elected mayor of his hometown, Santa Sofia.

Nanni was in favour of Italian intervention in World War I, which was in contrast with the internationalist position of the PSI. He was director, together with Guido Bergamo and Maria Rygier, of the interventionist newspaper La riscossa, founded in Bologna in 1915. He became friends with Leandro Arpinati, a young socialist from Civitella (9 km from Santa Sofia) who ideologically moved from anarchism to defencism, and began a collaboration with Il Popolo d'Italia, the newspaper founded by Mussolini.

Despite Nanni's interventionist position, he never distanced himself from socialism and did not involve himself with the rise fascism in Italy. After the March on Rome he was about to be lynched by the Florentine Squadristi, led by Amerigo Dumini and supported by local landowners, but was saved by his friend Arpinati. During the 1920s he had to give up active politics, although he continued his journalistic and publishing activities.

Nanni, as supporter of the Resistance in Forlì, took refuge with his old friend Leandro Arpinati, one of the highest fascist leaders who had been expelled from the party and sentenced to confinement before retiring to private life in the countryside of Bologna. He was killed on 22 April 1945 by Gappisti partisans while he was trying to shield his friend Arpinati with his body. The act was celebrated by the poet Ezra Pound in The Cantos (Canto 91).

== Main works ==
- Torquato Nanni (1915). Benito Mussolini (in Italian). Firenze: Libreria della Voce.
- Torquato Nanni (1924). Bolscevismo e fascismo al lume della critica marxista (in Italian). Bologna: Cappelli.
- Torquato Nanni (1942). Profondità di vita; esame storico degli istinti fondamentali (in Italian). Milano: Fratelli Bocca Editori.
