= Iris Versari =

Italian partisan (1922–1944)

- Born: 12 December 1922; Poggio di San Benedetto in Alpe
- Died: 18 August 1944 (aged 21); Tredozio
- Occupation: Partisan
- Awards: Gold Medal of Military Valor

Iris Versari (12 December 1922 – 18 August 1944) was an Italian partisan from Emilia-Romagna who was decorated with a Gold Medal of Military Valour on 16 April 1976.

== Biography ==
=== Early life ===
Daughter of Angelo Versari, Iris lived with her family in Tredozio, a small town near Forlì. From a young age, Iris showed her strong spirit by escaping the unwanted attention she received from the male members of the wealthy families of Forlì where she worked as a handmaid. This humiliation shaped her strong personality.

Shortly after Iris got back home in Tredozio, in Autumn 1943, her family decided to hide in their house a partisan brigade. The family house was set on fire by the Nazis on 27 January 1944. Versari managed to escape, but her family (her father, mother and two of her three brothers) were arrested. Her father was sent to trial and sentenced to four years in prison, then he was interned in a Nazi concentration camp, where he died.

=== Contribution to Italian Resistance movement ===
In January 1944, Iris joined the Italian partisan brigade commanded by Silvio Corbari, fighting alongside him and also becoming his lover. Together, they took part in many brave actions against the Nazi forces.

On 18 August 1944, at dawn, in Ca' Cornio (near Tredozio), the house where Iris was hiding with Silvio Corbari, Arturo Spazzoli and Adriano Casadei was surrounded by Nazi troops. Informed about their presence by a spy, the troops tried to break into the house. Although she could not move because her leg was wounded in a previous gunfight, Iris managed to kill the first soldier who entered the house. But then she realized she could be an obstacle to her comrades’ escape and decided to kill herself. Despite her sacrifice, Corbari, Spazzoli and Casadei were caught and killed. Her dead body, together with those of her comrades, was hung under the colonnades of Castrocaro Terme and then on a lamp post in Piazza Aurelio Saffi, the central square of Forlì, so that everyone could see them.

== Acknowledgements and honours ==
Two upper secondary schools in Italy are named after Iris Versari: a trade school in Cesena (FC) and a senior high school in Cesano Maderno (MB). Streets in Forlì, Cesena (1949) and Rome (1993) were also named after her.

In 2007, a bill was presented to commemorate the women that took part in the Italian resistance movement, which would establish the construction of two monuments depicting Iris Versari, one in Forlì and one in Portico and San Benedetto (FC).

Versari was decorated with a Gold Medal of Military Valour on 16 April 1976:

A young woman of modest origins, in her twenties, following the tradition of the brave people of Romagna she did not hesitate to put herself at risk to fight the arrogant oppression of the invader, by joining a local partisan brigade. Daring and intrepid, she took active part in numerous guerrilla actions, distinguishing herself as a leader and a valiant fighter. During her last fight, when the enemies surrounded her and other partisans in an isolated farmhouse, though being injured and unable to move, she exhorted her companions to break the encirclement and, fighting fiercely, facilitated their escape. After having shot down the enemy officer who first entered the farmhouse, aware of the fate that awaited her if she fell alive into the hands of the cruel enemy, she killed herself. Thus she sacrificed her young life to those ideals she had nourished in her short but glorious existence. – Terra di Romagna, 9 September 1943 – 18 August 1944

== Bibliography ==
- Cacucci, Pino (2001). "Silvio, Iris e Adriano". Ribelli!. Milano: Feltrinelli. pp. 21–41. ISBN 88-07-17050-7.

== Filmography ==
- Valentino Orsini, Corbari, with Giuliano Gemma, Tina Aumont, 1971
- Eddi Bisulli, Una donna di nome Iris, documentary, 2006
- Antonio Spino, Partisans. La storia del Battaglione Corbari, documentary, 1996
