= Giardino Botanico di Valbonella =

Botanical garden in Italy

Coordinates: 43°51′36″N 11°46′48″E

The Giardino Botanico di Valbonella is a nature preserve and botanical garden in the Foreste Casentinesi, Monte Falterona, Campigna National Park, about 3 kilometers from Corniolo, Santa Sofia, Province of Forlì-Cesena, Emilia-Romagna, Italy. Located at an altitude of 700 meters, it has a surface of two hectares.

The garden was established in 1983 by the regional and provincial governments, in collaboration with the State Forestry Corps, for education about the natural environment of the Apennine Mountains. It contains about 300 indigenous species, with 3 thematic trails through forest, wetlands, and open fields. Many plants are marked with cards giving scientific name, flowering period, etc.

== See also ==
- List of botanical gardens in Italy
