= Versari =

Versari is a surname. Notable people with the surname include:

- Gianni Versari (born 1958), Panamanian swimmer
- Iris Versari (1922–1944), Italian partisan
