= Solona =

Solona may refer to the following places:

== Italy ==
- Solona (ancient city), an ancient town of Gallia Cispadana, probably in present Emilia-Romagna region

== Ukraine ==
- Solona River (Bazavluk), a tributary of the Bazavluk River
- Solona River (Vovcha), a tributary of the Vovcha River

== Romania ==
- Solona, a village in the commune Surduc, Sălaj County
- Solona (Someș), a tributary of the Someș in Sălaj County
