= Rocca San Casciano =

- Comune
- Comune di Rocca San Casciano
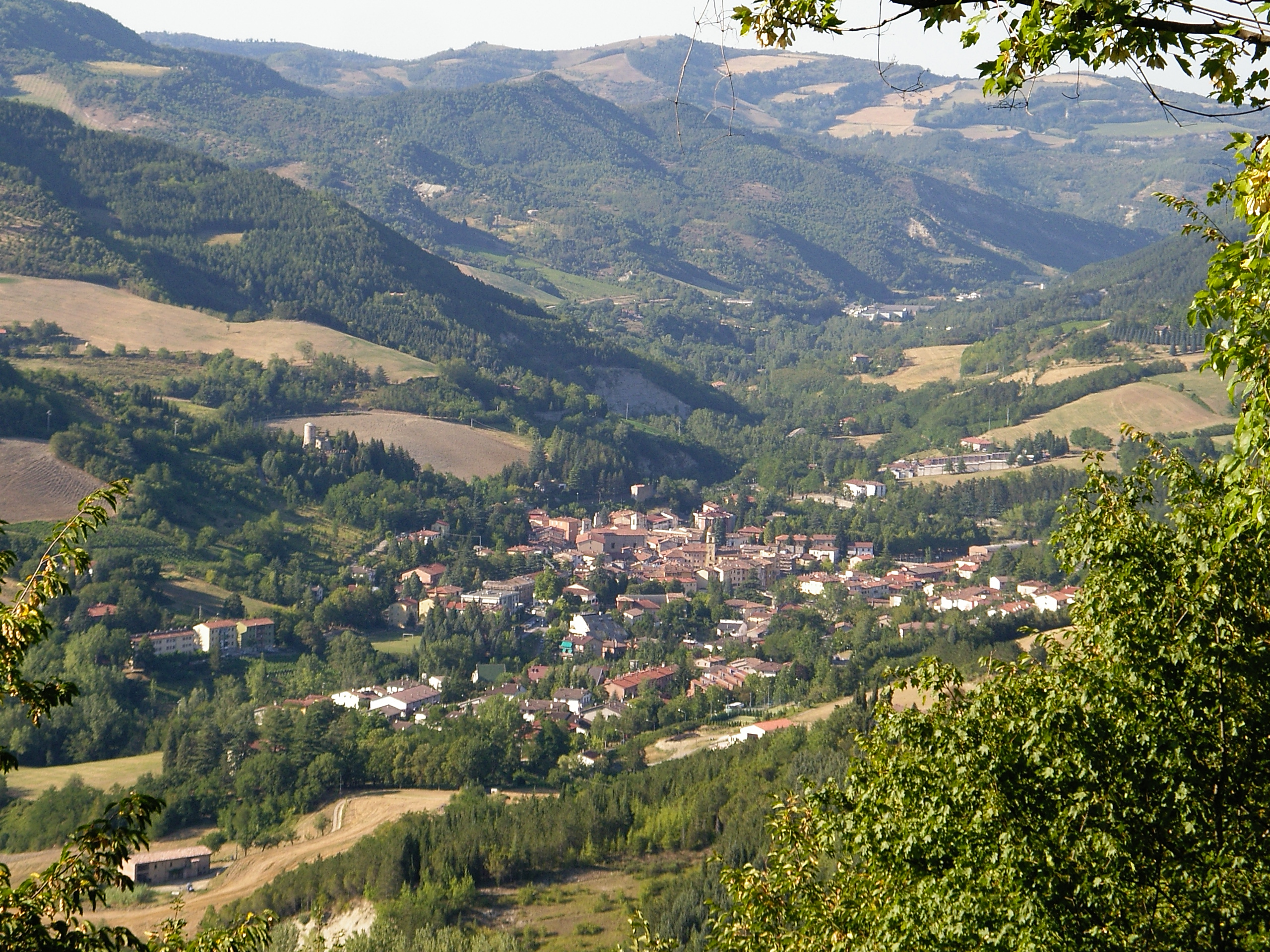
- View of Rocca San Casciano

- Coat of arms

- Location within Italy Location within Emilia-Romagna
- Coordinates: 44°4′N 11°51′E
- Country: Italy
- Region: Emilia-Romagna
- Province: Forlì-Cesena (FC)
- Frazioni: Campomaggio, Casanova, Pratolungo

Government
  - Mayor: Marco Valenti

Area
  - Total: 50.19 km^{2} (19.38 sq mi)
- Elevation: 210 m (690 ft)

Population (2019)
  - Total: 1,810
  - Density: 36.1/km^{2} (93.4/sq mi)
- Demonym: Rocchigiani
- Time zone: UTC+1 (CET)
  - Summer (DST): UTC+2 (CEST)
- Postal code: 47017
- Dialing code: 0543
- Patron saint: Saint Cassian of Imola
- Saint day: August 13
- Website: Official website

Rocca San Casciano (Romagnol: La Ròca or Roca San Casiân) is a comune (municipality) in the Province of Forlì-Cesena in the Italian region Emilia-Romagna, located about 60 kilometres (37 mi) southeast of Bologna and about 25 kilometres (16 mi) southwest of Forlì.

== Geography ==
Rocca San Casciano borders the following municipalities: Dovadola, Galeata, Modigliana, Portico e San Benedetto, Predappio, Premilcuore and Tredozio.

== Festa del Falò ==
Rocca San Casciano is popular in the area for its Festa del Falò ("Bonfires Feast"), which is believed to originate from Celtic Pagan rites. It is documented that bonfires have been lit near the Montone River ever since the 12th century; later the event became associated with Saint Joseph's Day (19 March).

== History ==
Rocca San Casciano is created in the 1200 d.C.
