= Borghi =

- Comune
- Comune di Borghi
- Location within Italy Location within Emilia-Romagna
- Coordinates: 44°2′N 12°21′E
- Country: Italy
- Region: Emilia-Romagna
- Province: Province of Forlì-Cesena (FC)

Government
  - Mayor: Piero Mussoni

Area
  - Total: 30.24 km^{2} (11.68 sq mi)

Population (30 April 2017)
  - Total: 2,830
  - Density: 93.6/km^{2} (242/sq mi)
- Demonym: 264
- Time zone: UTC+1 (CET)
  - Summer (DST): UTC+2 (CEST)
- Postal code: 47030
- Dialing code: 0541
- Website: Official website

Borghi (Romagnol: I Béurch or I Béurgh) is a comune (municipality) in the Province of Forlì-Cesena, Emilia-Romagna, Italy. It is located about 100 kilometres (62 mi) southeast of Bologna and about 35 kilometres (22 mi) southeast of Forlì.

Borghi borders the following municipalities: Longiano, Poggio Berni, Roncofreddo, Santarcangelo di Romagna, Sogliano al Rubicone, Torriana.
