= Bagno di Romagna =

- Comune
- Comune di Bagno di Romagna
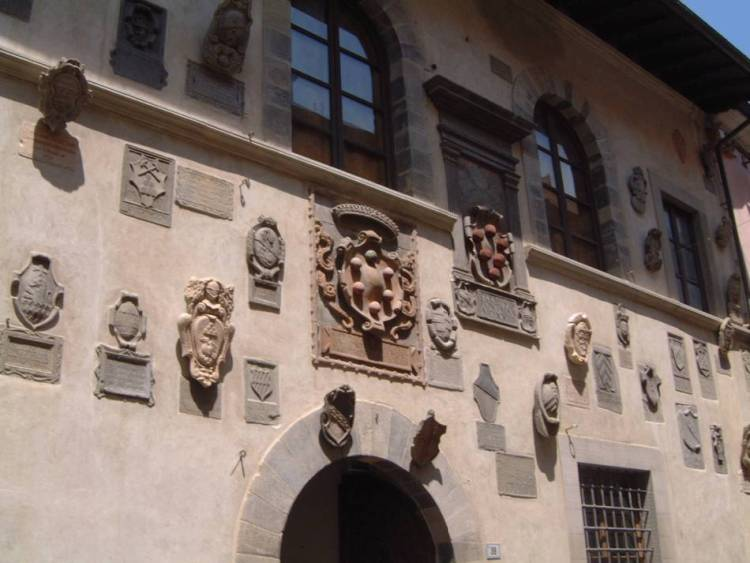
- The Medici coat of arms of the façade of the Palazzo dei Capitani.

- Location within Italy Location within Emilia-Romagna
- Coordinates: 43°50′N 11°58′E
- Country: Italy
- Region: Emilia-Romagna
- Province: Forlì-Cesena (FC)
- Frazioni: Larciano, Crocesanta, Valgianna, Selvapiana, Acquapartita, Donicilio, Ridracoli, Monteguidi, Spinello, Bucchio, Civorio, Vessa, Saiaccio, San Silvestro, Montegranelli, Paganico

Government
  - Mayor: Marco Baccini (Visione Comune)

Area
  - Total: 233.1 km^{2} (90.0 sq mi)
- Elevation: 491 m (1,611 ft)

Population (1 January 2009)
  - Total: 6,187
  - Density: 26.54/km^{2} (68.74/sq mi)
- Demonym: Bagnesi
- Time zone: UTC+1 (CET)
  - Summer (DST): UTC+2 (CEST)
- Postal code: 47021
- Dialing code: 0543
- Patron saint: Saints Peter and Paul
- Saint day: June 29
- Website: Official website

Bagno di Romagna (Bagnese: Bagne ed Romàgna; Romagnol: Bagn d'Rumàgna) is a comune (municipality) in the Province of Forlì-Cesena in the Italian region Emilia-Romagna, located about 90 kilometres (56 mi) southeast of Bologna and about 45 kilometres (28 mi) south of Forlì. Bagno di Romagna borders the following municipalities: Bibbiena, Chiusi della Verna, Mercato Saraceno, Poppi, Pratovecchio, Santa Sofia, Sarsina, Verghereto.

A renowned centre for thermal cares (due to various natural springs that supply water at 47 °C, rich in sodium-carbonate-sulphur micro-elements) and nature tourism (due to its proximity of a 368 square kilometres (142 sq mi) national park, namely the Foreste Casentinesi, Monte Falterona, Campigna National Park, with woodlands, kilometers of paths in the woods, mountains and a major artificial lake. It is one of I Borghi più belli d'Italia ("The most beautiful villages of Italy").

== History ==
Bagno di Romagna was originally an Umbrian settlement, linked to the nearby town of Sarsina, hometown of the Latin comic author Plautus. The Romans founded what became the actual town, whose Latin name, balneum (meaning 'bath'), comes after its natural hot springs. At that time, it was a trading post and spa on the route between Rome and Ravenna, where the second largest Roman military fleet was moored, and many of the Roman legions had their winter quarters.

In 540 AD, the town was raided by the Ostrogoths, a Germanic tribe that invaded Italy. The town recovered during the fourteenth century, under the patronage of the Guidi family, who surrounded it with a line of defensive walls, and developed a system of small castles (e.g. Corzano, Montegranelli) to control the valley. Consequently trade flourished, and later the town was acquired by Florence and the Grand Duchy of Tuscany. The town doubled in size during the Middle Ages, as a permanent market-place surrounded by dwellings, churches, and various buildings developed a few kilometres downstream, along the river Savio: Borgo Sancti Petri, now San Piero in Bagno.

The whole town was sacked by the Landsknecht army of Charles V on its way to Rome in 1527. Probably on this occasion the castle of Corzano was destroyed. Its ruins were later reused to build the homonymous religious sanctuary, and other dwellings.

The town became part of the Kingdom of Italy in 1860. Historically part of Tuscany, it was annexed to the Province of Forlì in the region of Emilia-Romagna in 1923, since dictator Benito Mussolini wanted the source of the River Tiber, which is located nearby, to be included within his native province.

During the Second World War, in 1943 the town was occupied by the German army, and found itself on the hot border (Gothic Line) between the fascist Republic of Salò and the part of Italy occupied by the British Army, which liberated Bagno di Romagna in September 1944. The multi-ethnic Commonwealth troops (e.g. British, Polish, and Indian) were joyfully welcomed by the population, who had suffered one year of dire straits, and had witnessed brutal fightings between partisans on the one side, and Nazi occupiers on the other. For example, in July 1943, about thirty local male civilians were killed by Wehrmacht troops, in retaliation for the killing of three Nazi soldiers by partisans nearby. As a result, the whole area developed anti-fascist sentiments that endured throughout the post-war period.

Peace and post-war industrialisation yielded economic prosperity and wealth. Small industries, businesses and tourism flourished. However, all of the non-agricultural activities concentrated in the two main residential areas of San Piero (population ca. 3000) and Bagno (population ca. 800), while many tiny mountain villages and hamlets were depopulated, or completely abandoned. Now they are part of the many attractions offered by the natural surroundings.

== Main sights ==
- Foreste Casentinesi, Monte Falterona, Campigna National Park
- Basilica of Santa Maria Assunta (according to the tradition, founded in 860). It has a 39-metre (128 ft) high bell tower, a baptismal font from the year 1000, a tabernacle attributed to the school of Giuliano da Maiano and a notable portal with the crest of the Camaldolese order.
- Palazzo del Capitano ("Captain's Palace"), once the seat of the Florentine administrators. It is now the administrative headquarter of the National Park.
- Lake of Ridracoli.
- Santuario della Madonna di Corzano, a small church and annexed hermitage, both perfectly preserved, located on a hilltop 678 metres above the sea level, facing the suburb of San Piero in Bagno. Near this lie the ruins of the castle destroyed by the Landsknecht in 1527.

== Twin towns ==
- Moutiers, France
- Rapperswil, Switzerland
