= Mercato Saraceno =

- Comune
- Comune di Mercato Saraceno
- Coat of arms

- Location within Italy Location within Emilia-Romagna
- Coordinates: 43°57′N 12°12′E
- Country: Italy
- Region: Emilia-Romagna
- Province: Forlì-Cesena (FC)
- Frazioni: Bacciolino, Bora, Cella, Ciola, Colonnata, Falcino, Linaro, Montecastello, Monte Iottone, Monte Sasso, Montesorbo, Musella, Paderno, Piavola, San Damiano, San Romano, Serra, Taibo, Tomano, Valleripa

Government
  - Mayor: Monica Rossi

Area
  - Total: 99.33 km^{2} (38.35 sq mi)
- Elevation: 134 m (440 ft)

Population (31 October 2017)
  - Total: 6,843
  - Density: 68.89/km^{2} (178.4/sq mi)
- Demonym: Mercatesi
- Time zone: UTC+1 (CET)
  - Summer (DST): UTC+2 (CEST)
- Postal code: 47025
- Dialing code: 0547
- Patron saint: St. Mary Novella
- Saint day: 8 September
- Website: Official website

Mercato Saraceno (Romagnol: Marchèt Sarasèin) is a comune (municipality) in the Province of Forlì-Cesena in the Italian region Emilia-Romagna, located about 90 kilometres (56 mi) southeast of Bologna and about 35 kilometres (22 mi) southeast of Forlì.

Mercato Saraceno borders the following municipalities: Bagno di Romagna, Cesena, Novafeltria, Roncofreddo, Sarsina, Sogliano al Rubicone, Talamello.

Arnaldo Mussolini (1885-1931), brother of Italian dictator Benito Mussolini, is buried here.

== Twin towns ==
Mercato Saraceno is twinned with:

- Villadossola, Italy, since 2010
