= Montiano =

- Comune
- Comune di Montiano
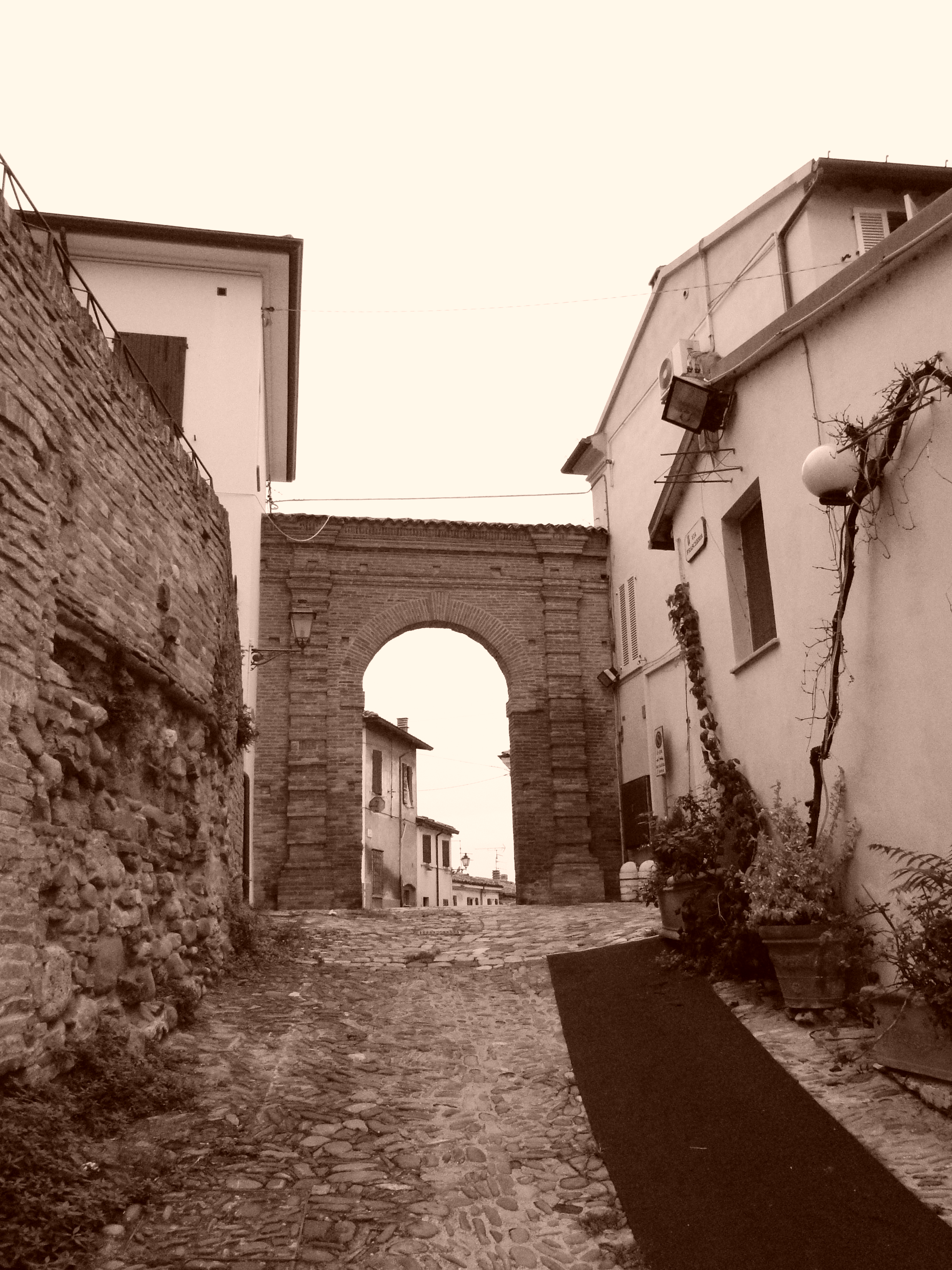
- View of Montiano

- Location within Italy Location within Emilia-Romagna
- Coordinates: 44°5′N 12°18′E
- Country: Italy
- Region: Emilia-Romagna
- Province: Province of Forlì-Cesena (FC)
- Frazioni: Badia, Montenovo

Area
  - Total: 9.3 km^{2} (3.6 sq mi)
- Elevation: 159 m (522 ft)

Population (Dec. 2004)
  - Total: 1,573
  - Density: 170/km^{2} (440/sq mi)
- Time zone: UTC+1 (CET)
  - Summer (DST): UTC+2 (CEST)
- Postal code: 47020
- Dialing code: 0547
- Website: Official website

Montiano (Romagnol: Muncin) is a comune (municipality) in the Province of Forlì-Cesena in the Italian region Emilia-Romagna, located about 90 kilometres (56 mi) southeast of Bologna and about 25 kilometres (16 mi) southeast of Forlì. As of 31 December 2004, it had a population of 1,573 and an area of 9.3 square kilometres (3.6 mi^{2}).

The municipality of Montiano contains the frazioni (subdivisions, mainly villages and hamlets) Badia and Montenovo.

Montiano borders the following municipalities: Cesena, Longiano, Roncofreddo.

== Demographic evolution ==
Historical population

Year	Pop.	±%
1861	1,659	—
1871	1,745	+5.2%
1881	1,811	+3.8%
1901	1,965	+8.5%
1911	2,218	+12.9%

Year	Pop.	±%
1921	2,221	+0.1%
1931	2,325	+4.7%
1936	2,294	−1.3%
1951	2,134	−7.0%
1961	1,827	−14.4%

Year	Pop.	±%
1971	1,565	−14.3%
1981	1,567	+0.1%
1991	1,545	−1.4%
2001	1,591	+3.0%

Source: Data from ISTAT

== Notable people ==
- Anselmo Gianfanti, painter
