= Galeata =

- Comune
- Comune di Galeata
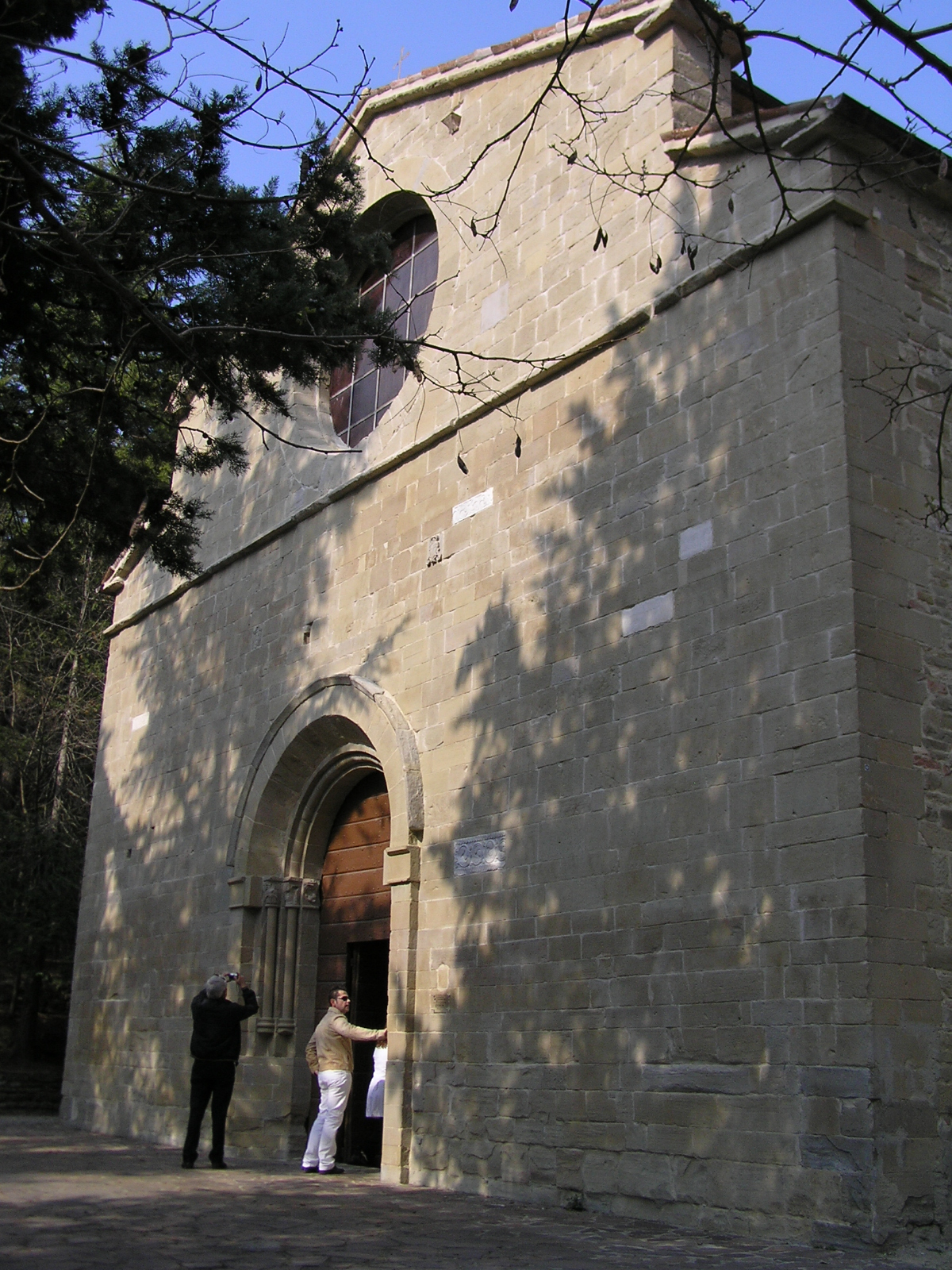
- Façade of the abbey of Sant'Ellero.

- Coat of arms

- Location within Italy Location within Emilia-Romagna
- Coordinates: 44°0′N 11°55′E
- Country: Italy
- Region: Emilia-Romagna
- Province: Forlì-Cesena (FC)
- Frazioni: Buggiana, Pianetto, Sant'Ellero, San Zeno, Strada San Zeno

Government
  - Mayor: Elisa Deo

Area
  - Total: 62.9 km^{2} (24.3 sq mi)
- Elevation: 237 m (778 ft)

Population (2008)
  - Total: 2,502
  - Density: 39.8/km^{2} (103/sq mi)
- Demonym: Galeatesi
- Time zone: UTC+1 (CET)
  - Summer (DST): UTC+2 (CEST)
- Postal code: 47010
- Dialing code: 0543
- Patron saint: St. Hilarius
- Website: Official website

Galeata (Romagnol: Gagliêda) is a comune (municipality) in the Province of Forlì-Cesena in the Italian region Emilia-Romagna, located about 70 kilometres (43 mi) southeast of Bologna and about 30 kilometres (19 mi) southwest of Forlì.

Galeata borders the following municipalities: Civitella di Romagna, Predappio, Premilcuore, Rocca San Casciano, Santa Sofia.

Galeata is a member of Cittaslow.

== History ==
Galeata's origins are connected to the old Umbrian town of Mevaniola, captured by the Romans in 266 BC. After the fall of the Western Roman Empire, the settlement was moved to the modern Galeata. The latter's fortunes in the Middle Ages stemmed from the creation of the powerful Abbey of Sant'Ellero (Hilary of Galeata), which administrated for centuries the nearby territories, with an army and fortresses of its own.

In the early 15th century, Galeata became part of the Florentine possessions, belonging to the Grand Duchy of Tuscany until 1860. It was part of the Province of Florence until 1923, when it was moved to the province of Forlì.

== Main sights ==
- Palazzo del Podestà (1636). It has a tower preceded by an ancient marble column sporting a Byzantine cross in the same material.
- The Romanesque abbey of Sant'Ellero, located 3 km outside the town. Nearby is another column celebrating a legendary meeting between St. Hilary and Theodoric the Great. The construction bean in 497 AD, but the current structure dates mostly from the 9th-10th centuries. Notable is the portal with capitals showing figures of sirens (symbolizing temptation and sin) and two riding monks with swords (symbolizing prayer and the church's struggle for Christianity). The façade has inside slabs of Byzantine origin. The interior, apart the presbytery, was mostly renewed in Baroque style in the 17th century. The crypt is supposed to be St. Hilary's original cell, and house his decorated sarcophagus in Greek marble (7th century).

Galeata is the site of some religious foundations, including Santa Maria del Pantano, the Abbey of Sant'Ellero (dedicated to Hilary of Galeata), and the convent of Santa Maria dei Miracoli.

- Church of Santa Maria del Pantano, consecrated in 1295 but most likely far older. It was part of an Augustinian convent. Frescoes from the 14th and 15th centuries are now in Mambrini Museum at Pianetto.
