= Solona (ancient city) =

Ancient town of Cisalpine Gaul

Solona was an ancient town of Gallia Cispadana, mentioned by Pliny among the municipal towns of the 8th region (Plin. iii. 15. s. 20), but the name of the Solonates is found also in an inscription, which confirms its municipal rank (Gruter, Inscr. p. 1095. 2). Unfortunately this inscription, which was found at Ariminum (modern Rimini), affords no clue to the site of Solona: it is placed by Cluver at a place called Città del Sole (in the comune of Castrocaro Terme e Terra del Sole) about 8 km southwest of Forlì; but Smith claims that this site would seem too close to the latter, the then important town of Forum Livii. (Cluver, Ital., p. 291.)
