= Terra del Sole =

Renaissance fortified town in Emilia-Romagna, Italy

Coordinates: 44°11′N 11°57′E

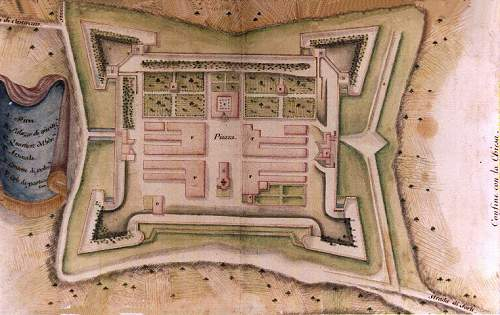
Plan of Baldassarre Lanci's new town at Terra del Sole

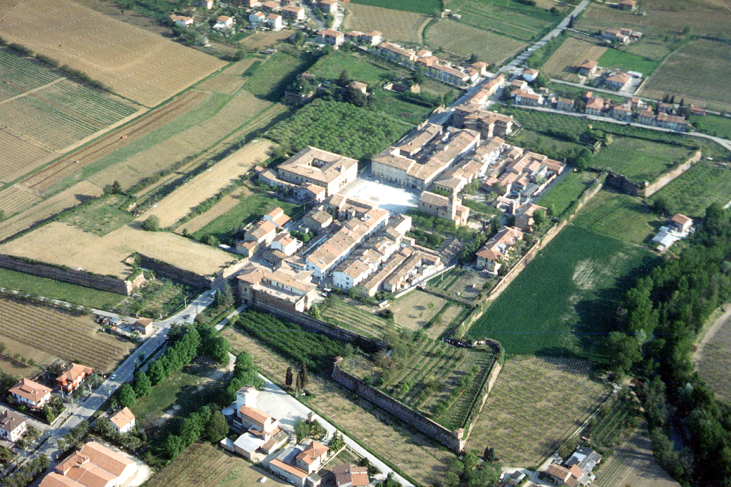
Terra del Sole, aerial view

Terra del Sole is a town constructed in 1564 for Cosimo I de’ Medici by Baldassarre Lanci of Urbino, in what is now the Province of Forlì-Cesena, northern Italy. It was one of the first fortified cities to be constructed entirely from new on a planned grid system. Meaning Town of the Sun it was conceived to be the ideal town of the Renaissance period.

Designed on a rectangular plan, with a square inner wall with a bastion at each corner. Terra del Sole was not just a residential town, but also had a strong defence to meet any onslaught that may have arisen following the recent invention, and common use of firearms in military attacks. In places the walls are 9 metres thick. Within the walls—2,087 metres (6,847 ft) wide and 12.36 metres (40.6 ft) high—are symmetrical settlements divided by streets. Two small castles within the walls were the strongholds of the "Captain of the Artillery" and the "Governor of the City". The four quarters of the town were named Santa Maria, Santa Reparata, Sant’Andrea and San Martino.

The central piazza was named "Piazza d’Armi", and was enclosed by the principal public buildings of - Church of Santa Reparata, the Palazzo del Provveditore, the Palazzo della Cancelleria, other civic buildings, and the Palazzo Pretorio (today the Museum of Man and the Environment)

The town still stands and today has a population of 6,096, while small clusters of houses have sprung up outside its walls. The town as conceived by Cosimo de' Medici is still very evident.
