= Castrocaro Terme e Terra del Sole =

- Comune
- Comune di Castrocaro Terme e Terra del Sole
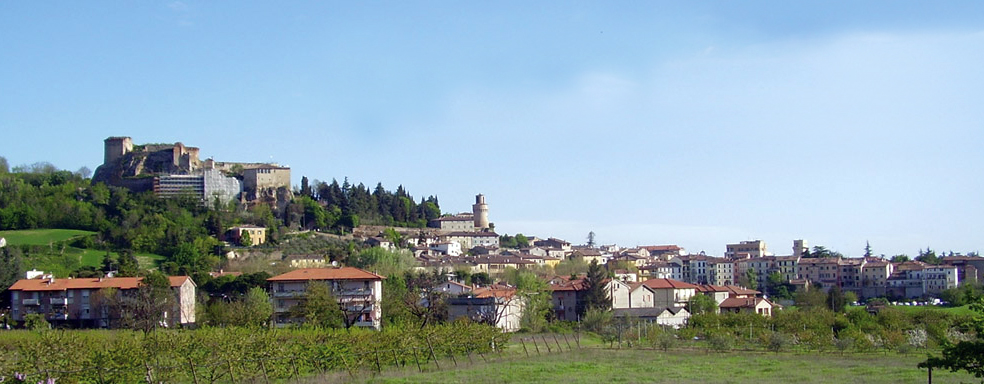
- View of Castrocaro Terme e Terra del Sole

- Coat of arms

- Location within Italy Location within Emilia-Romagna
- Coordinates: 44°11′N 11°56′E
- Country: Italy
- Region: Emilia-Romagna
- Province: Forlì-Cesena (FC)
- Frazioni: Castrocaro Terme (municipal seat), Terra del Sole, Pieve Salutare

Government
  - Mayor: Marianna Tonellato

Area
  - Total: 38.95 km^{2} (15.04 sq mi)
- Elevation: 68 m (223 ft)

Population (30 June 2017)
  - Total: 6,321
  - Density: 162.3/km^{2} (420.3/sq mi)
- Demonym(s): Castrocaresi and Terrasolani
- Time zone: UTC+1 (CET)
  - Summer (DST): UTC+2 (CEST)
- Postal code: 47011 (Castrocaro and Pieve Salutare), 47010 (Terra del Sole)
- Dialing code: 0543
- Website: Official website

Castrocaro Terme e Terra del Sole (Romagnol: Castruchèira or Castruchêra e Tèra de Sòlis) is a comune (municipality) in the Province of Forlì-Cesena in the Italian region Emilia-Romagna, located about 60 kilometres (37 mi) southeast of Bologna and about 10 kilometres (6 mi) southwest of Forlì.

The comune consists of three small towns: Castrocaro, Terra del Sole and Pieve Salutare. Terra del Sole, founded as a 16th-century fortress by Cosimo I de' Medici, is believed to occupy the site of the ancient city of Solona, which lends its name to the town Terra del Sole.

Castrocaro Terme e Terra del Sole borders the following municipalities: Brisighella, Dovadola, Forlì, Modigliana, Predappio.

Castrocaro is home to a spa. It is also the seat of the Castrocaro Music Festival, featuring new singers.

== See also ==
- Terra del Sole
