= Dovadola =

- Comune
- Comune di Dovadola
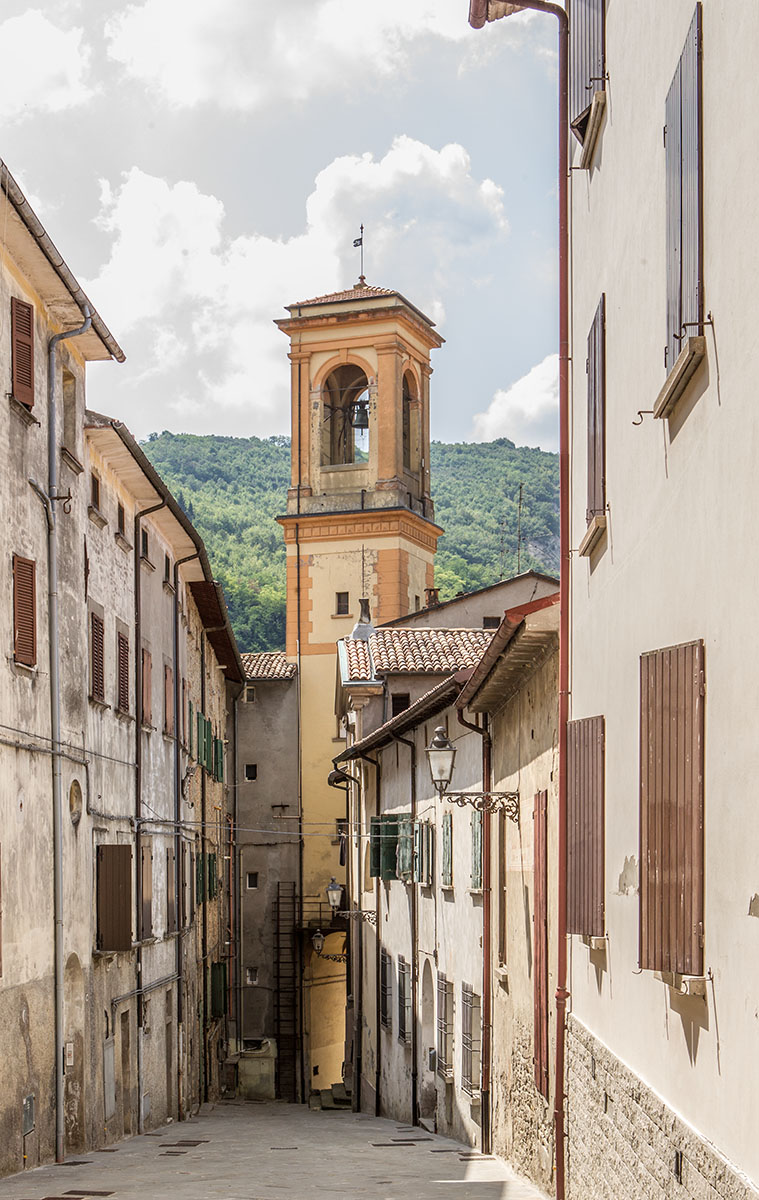
- View of Dovadola

- Coat of arms

- Location within Italy Location within Emilia-Romagna
- Coordinates: 44°7′N 11°53′E
- Country: Italy
- Region: Emilia-Romagna
- Province: Forlì-Cesena (FC)

Government
  - Mayor: Francesco Tassinari

Area
  - Total: 38.97 km^{2} (15.05 sq mi)
- Elevation: 143 m (469 ft)

Population (31 July 2017)
  - Total: 1,595
  - Density: 40.93/km^{2} (106.0/sq mi)
- Demonym: Dovadolesi
- Time zone: UTC+1 (CET)
  - Summer (DST): UTC+2 (CEST)
- Postal code: 47013
- Dialing code: 0543
- Patron saint: St. Andrew Apostle
- Saint day: November 30
- Website: Official website

Dovadola (Romagnol: Dvêdla) is a comune (municipality) in the Province of Forlì-Cesena in the Italian region Emilia-Romagna, located about 60 kilometres (37 mi) southeast of Bologna and about 20 kilometres (12 mi) southwest of Forlì, on the road leading to Florence.

Dovadola borders the following municipalities: Castrocaro Terme e Terra del Sole, Modigliana, Predappio, Rocca San Casciano.
