= Modigliana =

- Comune
- Comune di Modigliana
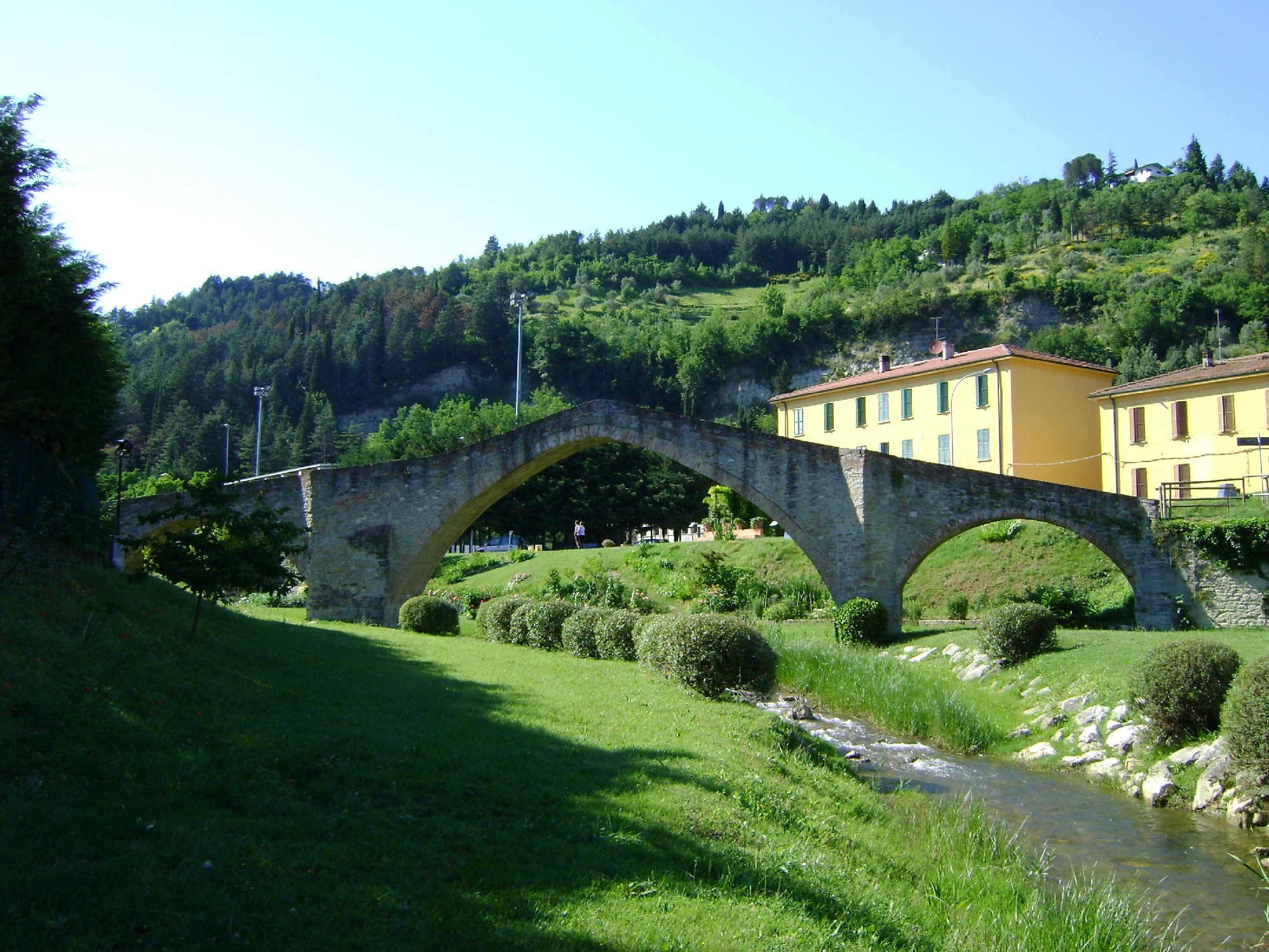
- Ponte San Donato or Ponte "della Signora".

- Coat of arms

- Location within Italy Location within Emilia-Romagna
- Coordinates: 44°10′N 11°48′E
- Country: Italy
- Region: Emilia-Romagna
- Province: Forlì-Cesena (FC)

Government
  - Mayor: Jader Dardi

Area
  - Total: 101.17 km^{2} (39.06 sq mi)
- Elevation: 185 m (607 ft)

Population (31 October 2017)
  - Total: 4,479
  - Density: 44.27/km^{2} (114.7/sq mi)
- Demonym: Modiglianesi
- Time zone: UTC+1 (CET)
  - Summer (DST): UTC+2 (CEST)
- Postal code: 47015
- Dialing code: 0546
- Website: Official website

Modigliana (Romagnol: Mudgiâna) is a comune (municipality) in the Province of Forlì-Cesena in the Italian region Emilia-Romagna, located about 50 kilometres (31 mi) southeast of Bologna and about 20 kilometres (12 mi) southwest of Forlì. The toponym derives from (Castrum) Mutilum, meaning ‘cut off, broken’, with the adjectival suffix -ānus.

== History ==
The city stands in the place where, according to Ludovico Muratori, the Roman Castrum Mutilum mentioned by Livy was located. It is mentioned in documents dating from the 9th century as part of the Exarchate of Ravenna. It was the seat of the most important branch of the Guidi counts after Tegrimo I Guidi married the countess Ingelrada, daughter of Martino duke of Ravenna, in the 10th century.

In 1271, the Guidi counts signed pacts with the community of Modigliana, thus officially recognizing the birth of the municipality. In the spring of 1377 it freed itself from the comital dominion; subsequently, the city came under the influence of the Republic of Florence, depending first on the Florentine lordship and then on the Grand Duchy of Tuscany and enjoying a privileged position with respect to Florence. From 1510 it was an independent podestà's office, from 1772 the seat of a deanery. Important local institutions were founded in this period: in 1660 the prestigious Accademia letteraria degli Incamminati (still existing), in 1722 the Spedale dei poveri di Cristo, and in 1738 the Monte Pio.

During the French occupation, Modigliana was a seat of a sub-prefecture in the Arno department. The role of capital city passed to Rocca San Casciano with the Restoration. In 1838 Modigliana was declared a "noble city" and a few years later, in 1850, it became the seat of its own diocese: from 1850 until 1986 Modigliana Cathedral was the seat of the diocese of Modigliana.

== Neighbouring municipalities ==
Modigliana borders the following municipalities: Brisighella, Castrocaro Terme e Terra del Sole, Dovadola, Marradi, Rocca San Casciano, Tredozio.

== Notable people ==
Famous 19th century painter Silvestro Lega was from Modigliana, and every September the town holds a "Tableau Vivants Festival" in which citizens dress in 19th century costume and reenact Lega's paintings.

The Sephardic Jewish Modigliani and Modiano families trace their origins back to Modigliana.
