= Santa Sofia, Emilia–Romagna =

Santa Sofia
- Comune
- Comune di Santa Sofia
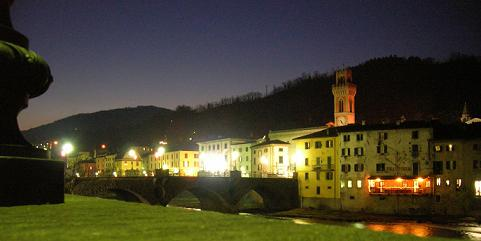
- View of Santa Sofia

- Coat of arms

- Location within Italy Location within Emilia-Romagna
- Coordinates: 43°57′N 11°54′E
- Country: Italy
- Region: Emilia–Romagna
- Province: Forlì-Cesena (FC)
- Frazioni: Berleta, Biserno, Bleda, Burraia, Cabelli, Campigna, Camposonaldo, Chalet Burraia, Collina di Pondo, Corniolo, Isola, Monte Falco, Rifugio La Capanna, San Martino, Spinello

Government
  - Mayor: Flavio Foietta

Area
  - Total: 148.5 km^{2} (57.3 sq mi)
- Elevation: 257 m (843 ft)

Population (31 May 2007)
  - Total: 4,238
  - Density: 28.54/km^{2} (73.91/sq mi)
- Demonym: Santasofiesi
- Time zone: UTC+1 (CET)
  - Summer (DST): UTC+2 (CEST)
- Postal code: 47018
- Dialing code: 0543
- Patron saint: St. Lucy of Syracuse
- Saint day: December 13
- Website: Official website

Santa Sofia (Romagnol: Santa Sfía) is a comune (municipality) in the Province of Forlì-Cesena in the Italian region Emilia–Romagna, located about 80 kilometres (50 mi) southeast of Bologna and about 35 kilometres (22 mi) southwest of Forlì. The municipality of Santa Sofia is located in the Bidente river valley and is surrounded by the Foreste Casentinesi, Monte Falterona, Campigna National Park.

Santa Sofia borders the following municipalities: Bagno di Romagna, Civitella di Romagna, Galeata, Pratovecchio, Premilcuore, San Godenzo, Sarsina, Stia.

== Main sights ==
Santa Sofia is located within the Foreste Casentinesi, Monte Falterona, Campigna National Park.

Sights include:

- Church of the Holy Crucifix, housing a 15th-century crucifix.
- Giardino Botanico di Valbonella, a nature preserve and botanical garden
- Romanesque pieve at Corniolo, with a ceramics by the Della Robbia workshop
- Sculpture Park, at Spinello

== Notable people ==
- Guelfo Zamboni, Italian diplomat and humanitarian
- Pope Paschal II, head of the Catholic Church and ruler of the Papal States
