= Fiumi Uniti =

River in Italy

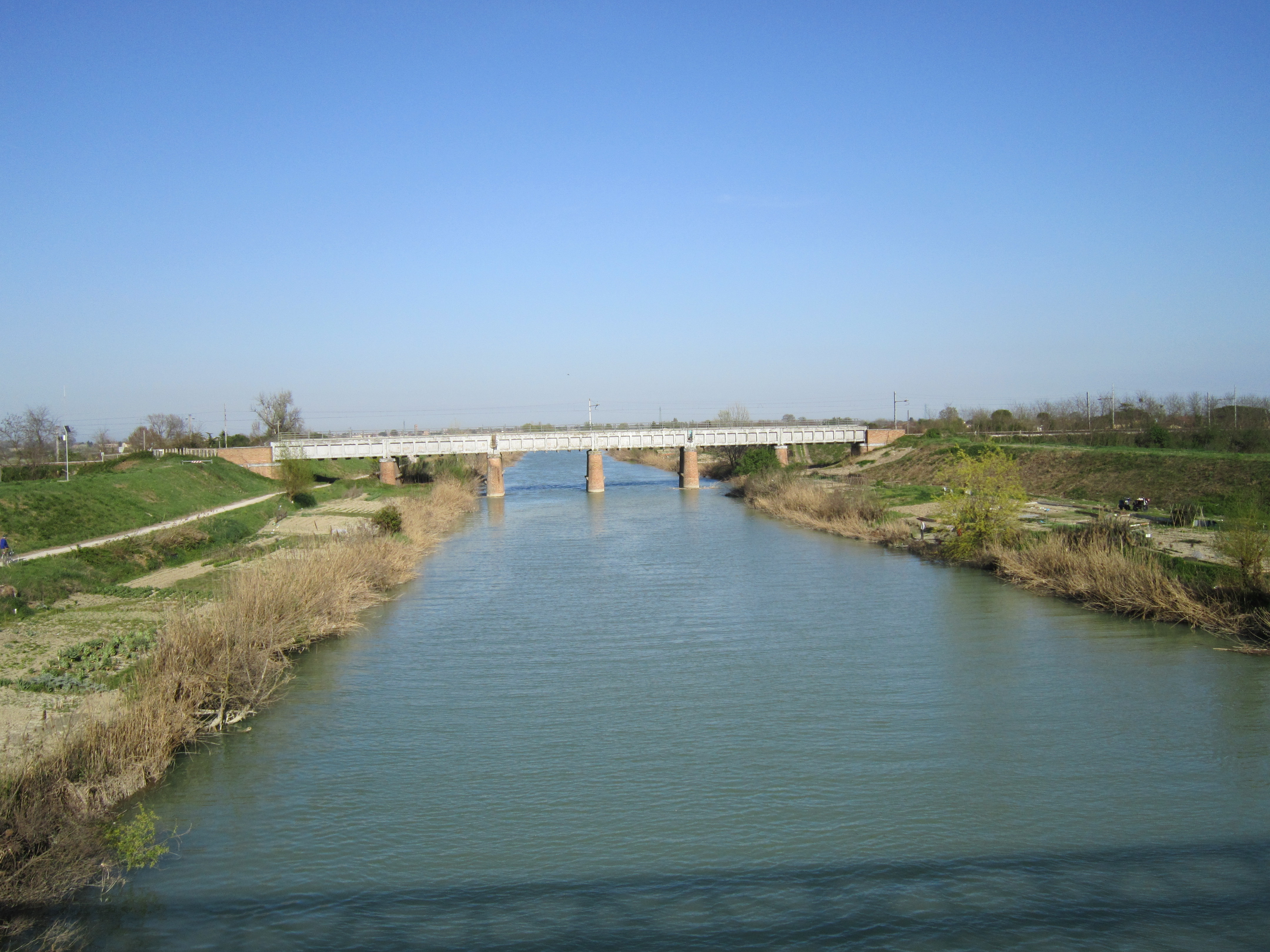

Location
- Country: Italy

Physical characteristics
- Source
  - location: near Ravenna at the confluence of the Montone and Ronco
  - elevation: 1 m (3.3 ft)
- Mouth: Adriatic Sea
  - coordinates: 44.39289°N 12.31611°E
- Length: 12 km (7.5 mi)
- Discharge
  - average: 10 m^{3}/s (350 cu ft/s)

The Fiumi Uniti is a river in the province of Ravenna in the Emilia-Romagna region of Italy. The source of the river is the confluence of the rivers Montone and Ronco south of Ravenna. The river flows east 12 kilometers before entering the Adriatic Sea south of Lido Adriano.

== History ==
During the late Middle Ages and early modern period, Ravenna was surrounded by the Montone and the Ronco rivers. The rivers would occasionally flood the city, sometimes disastrously. Beginning in the mid-17th century, attempts have been made to join the rivers and direct them away from the city. These attempts eventually led to the creation of the current Uniti river, which flows a safe distance to the south of Ravenna.
