= Civitella di Romagna =

- Comune
- Comune di Civitella di Romagna
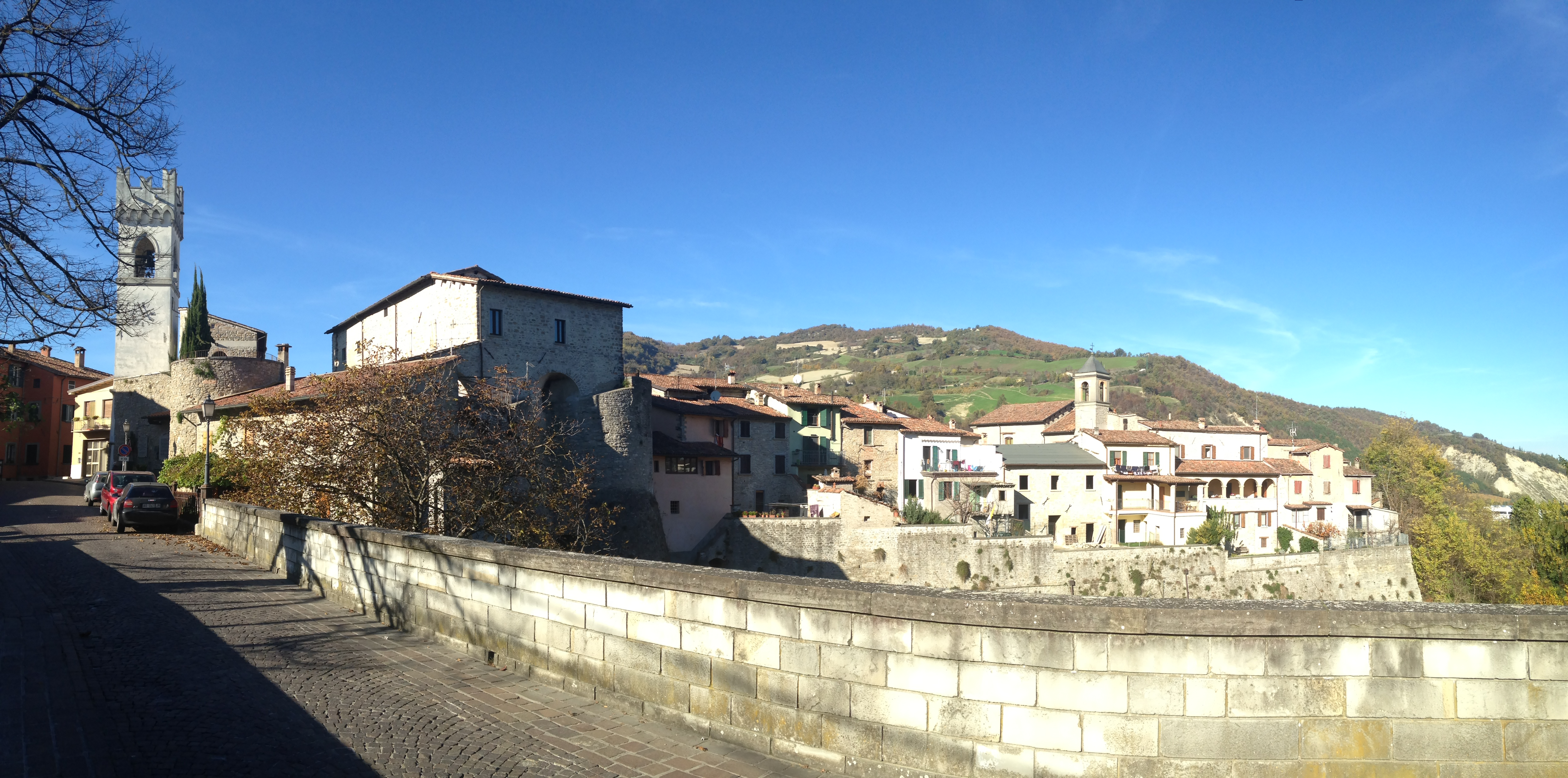
- View of Civitella di Romagna

- Coat of arms

- Location within Italy Location within Emilia-Romagna
- Coordinates: 44°0′N 11°56′E
- Country: Italy
- Region: Emilia-Romagna
- Province: forlì-Cesena (FC)
- Frazioni: Castagnolo, Cigno, Civorio, Collina, Cusercoli, Giaggiolo, Nespoli, Petrella, San Paolo, Seggio, Seguno, Voltre

Government
  - Mayor: Pierangelo Bergamaschi

Area
  - Total: 117.8 km^{2} (45.5 sq mi)
- Elevation: 219 m (719 ft)

Population (31 May 2007)
  - Total: 3,790
  - Density: 32.2/km^{2} (83.3/sq mi)
- Time zone: UTC+1 (CET)
  - Summer (DST): UTC+2 (CEST)
- Postal code: 47012
- Dialing code: 0543
- Website: Official website

Civitella di Romagna (Romagnol: Zivitèla) is a comune (municipality) in the Province of Forlì-Cesena in the Italian region Emilia-Romagna, located about 70 kilometres (43 mi) southeast of Bologna and about 30 kilometres (19 mi) southwest of Forlì.

Civitella di Romagna borders the following municipalities: Cesena, Galeata, Meldola, Predappio, Santa Sofia, Sarsina.
