= Tredozio =

- Comune
- Comune di Tredozio
- Location within Italy Location within Emilia-Romagna
- Coordinates: 44°5′N 11°45′E
- Country: Italy
- Region: Emilia-Romagna
- Province: Forlì-Cesena (FC)
- Frazioni: San Valentino, Rocca Modigliana, Madonna della Neve

Government
  - Mayor: Simona Vietina

Area
  - Total: 62.4 km^{2} (24.1 sq mi)
- Highest elevation: 998 m (3,274 ft)
- Lowest elevation: 360 m (1,180 ft)

Population (31 May 2007)
  - Total: 1,296
  - Density: 20.8/km^{2} (53.8/sq mi)
- Demonym: Tredoziesi
- Time zone: UTC+1 (CET)
  - Summer (DST): UTC+2 (CEST)
- Postal code: 47019
- Dialing code: 0546
- Patron saint: Our Lady of Graces
- Saint day: May, the second sunday
- Website: Official website

Tredozio (Romagnol: Tardozî) is a comune (municipality) in the Province of Forlì-Cesena in the Italian region Emilia-Romagna, located about 60 kilometres (37 mi) southeast of Bologna and about 30 kilometres (19 mi) southwest of Forlì.

Tredozio borders the following municipalities: Marradi, Modigliana, Portico e San Benedetto, Rocca San Casciano.

== Demographic evolution ==
Historical population

Year	Pop.	±%
1861	3,106	—
1871	3,419	+10.1%
1881	3,466	+1.4%
1901	3,689	+6.4%
1911	3,985	+8.0%

Year	Pop.	±%
1921	4,059	+1.9%
1931	3,852	−5.1%
1936	3,867	+0.4%
1951	3,614	−6.5%
1961	2,537	−29.8%

Year	Pop.	±%
1971	1,754	−30.9%
1981	1,619	−7.7%
1991	1,454	−10.2%
2001	1,317	−9.4%

Source: Data from ISTAT

== Twin towns ==
- Arcevia, Italy
- Hofbieber, Germany
