= Foreste Casentinesi, Monte Falterona, Campigna National Park =

Parco Nazionale delle Foreste Casentinesi, Monte Falterona, Campigna
- IUCN category II (national park)
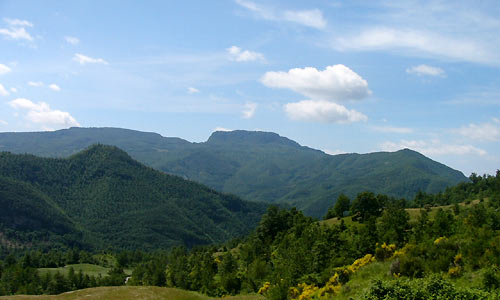
- View of the park

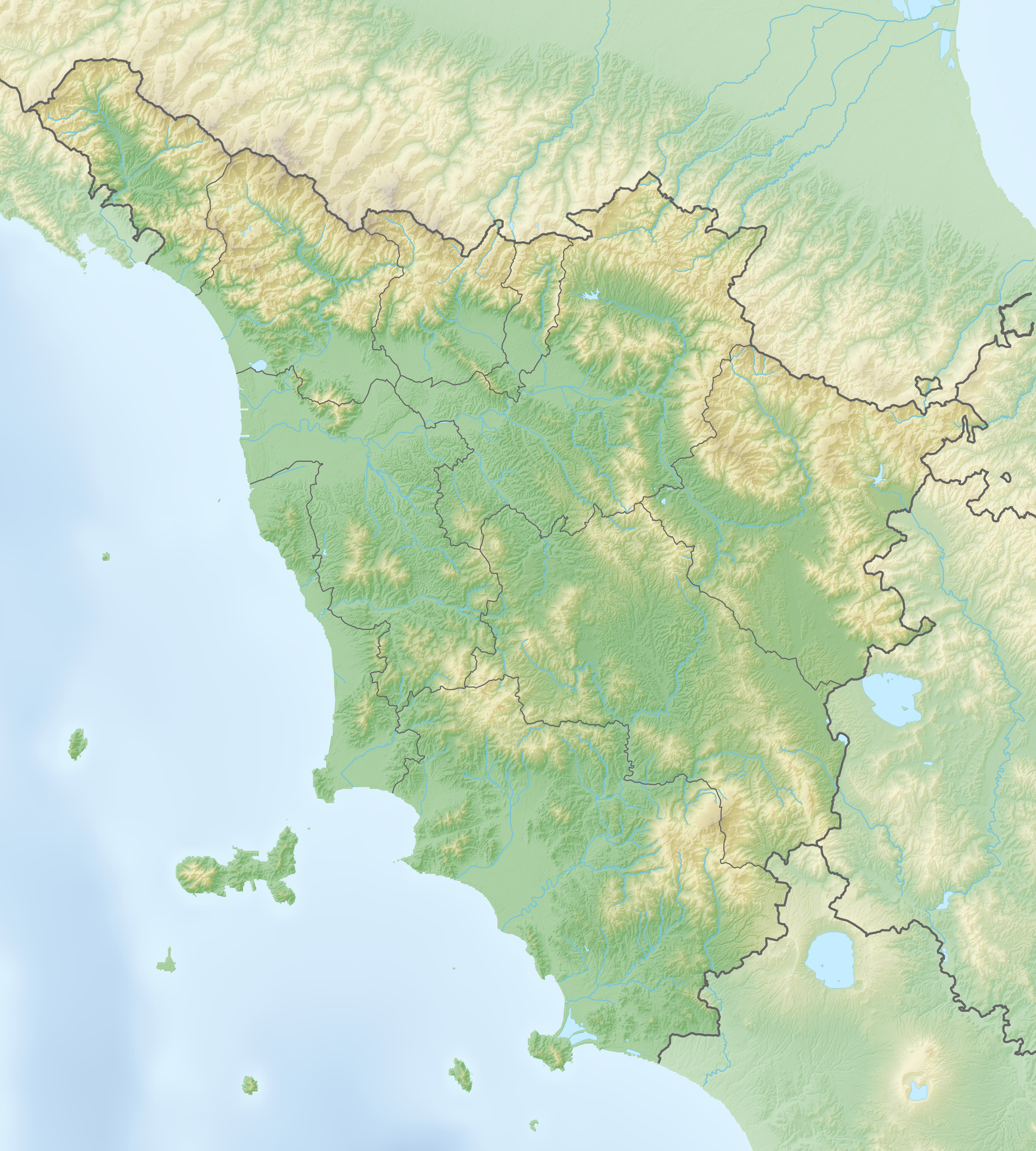
- Location within Italy Location within Tuscany
- Location: Emilia-Romagna, Tuscany
- Nearest city: Florence
- Coordinates: 43°52′03″N 11°46′46″E
- Area: 368 km^{2} (142 sq mi)
- Established: 1993
- Governing body: Ministero dell'Ambiente
- Website: www.parks.it/parco.nazionale.for.casentinesi/Eindex.html

Sasso Fratino Integral Reserve
UNESCO World Heritage Site
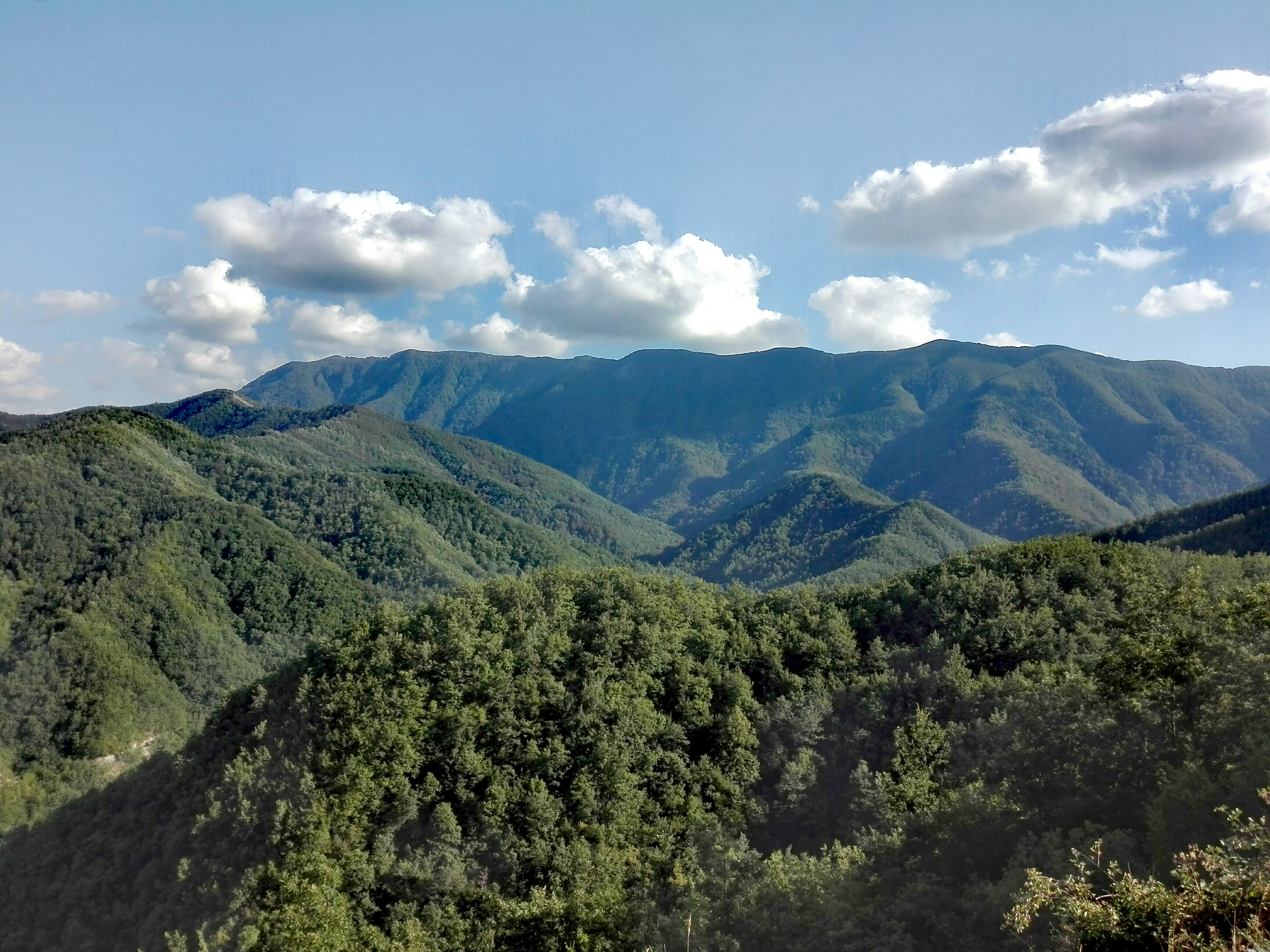
- View of Sasso Fratino Integral Reserve
- Interactive map of Sasso Fratino Integral Reserve
- Criteria: Natural: ix
- Reference: 1237
- Inscription: 2017 (41st Session)
- Area: 782 ha (1,930 acres)
- Buffer zone: 6,942 ha (17,150 acres)

The Parco Nazionale delle Foreste Casentinesi, Monte Falterona, Campigna is a national park in Italy. Created in 1993, it covers an area of about 368 square kilometres (142 sq mi), on the two sides of the Apennine watershed between Romagna and Tuscany, and is divided between the provinces of Forlì Cesena, Arezzo and Florence.

It extends around the long ridge, descending steeply along the parallel valleys of the Romagna side and more gradually on the Tuscan side, which has gentler slopes, especially in the Casentino area, which slopes down gradually to the broad valley of the Arno.

On 7 July 2017, in Kraków, the UNESCO Commission included the Sasso Fratino Integral Nature Reserve and the Beech Forests included in the perimeter of the park, in the World Heritage List within the serial site Ancient and Primeval Beech Forests of the Carpathians and Other Regions of Europe.

== Main sights ==
- Campigna – white fir
- Acquacheta – waterfall, mentioned in Dante's Comedy
- Badia Prataglia – beech wood
- Camaldoli – monastery
- Fiumicello – mill
- Valbonella Botanical Gardens – botanical garden near Corniolo
- Siemoni Arboretum – museum and historic arboretum located in Badia Prataglia
- Tredozio- Tramazzo River Valley
- Chiusi della Verna – Franciscan places
- Castagno d'Andrea – chestnut wood
- Ridracoli – lake and dam
- Foresta della Lama – wildlife
- Sasso Fratino – first integral nature reserve in Italy (1959)
- Springs of Tiber River – Mount Fumaiolo
- Springs of Arno River – Monte Falterona

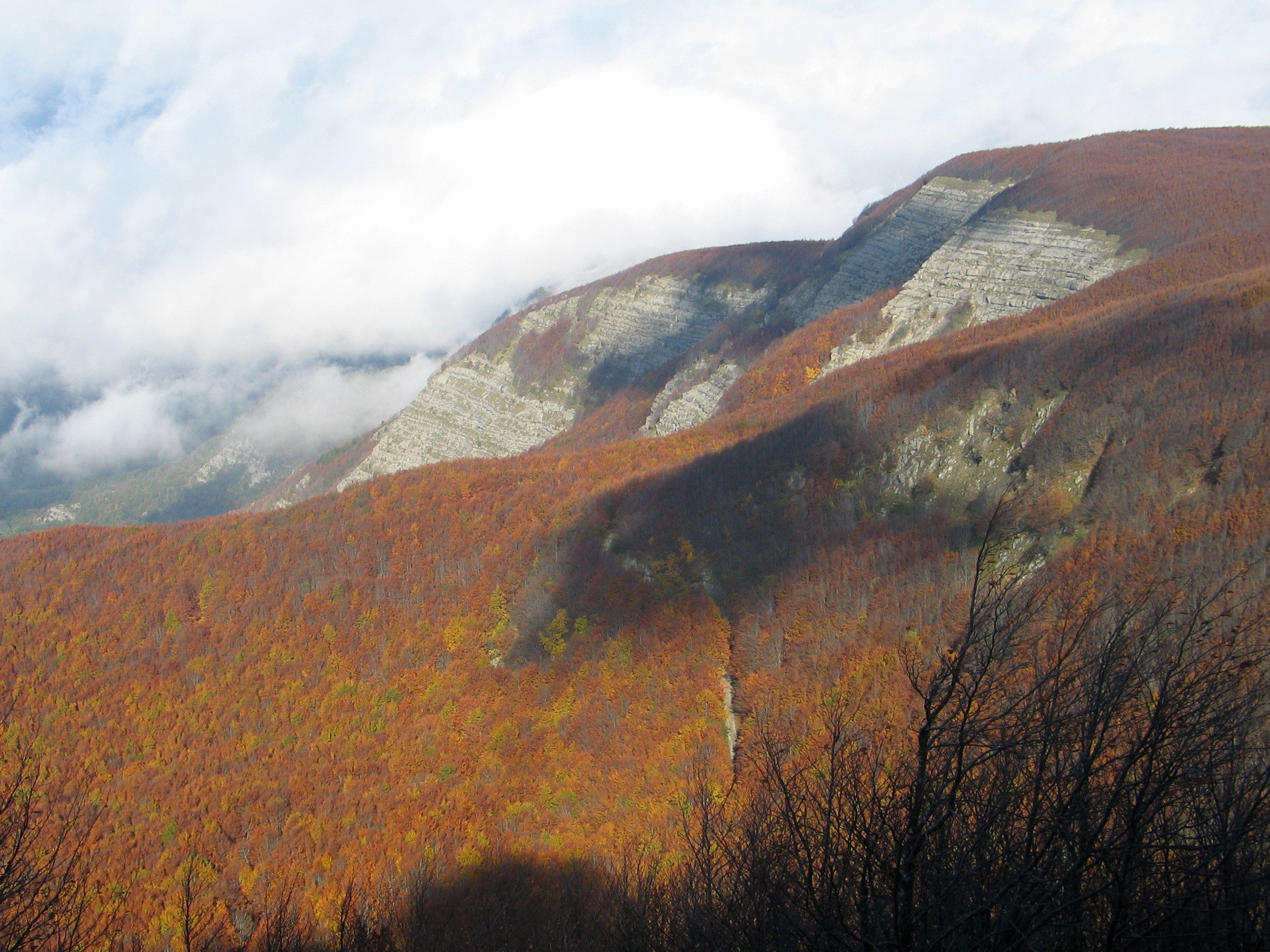
View from Summit of Monte Falco

== Wildlife ==
A large part of the park is woodland. In the park there are areas the mountain vegetation, all types of woodland of the lower sub-mountain belt vegetation. In the forest dominated by hornbeams, turkey oaks and sessile oaks, chestnut woods (especially in the Camaldoli area and at Castagno d’Andrea on the Florentine side). In rocky places there are some of the remaining rare cork oaks.

Flora inside the park includes 48 tree and shrub species and over 1000 herbaceous species. The most valuable collection is to be found in the Mount Falco-Falterona massif.

- Apennines wolf
- Barn owl
- Boar
- Common buzzard
- Eagle
- Eurasian badger
- Fallow deer
- Marten
- Red deer
- Red fox
- Roe deer
- Tawny owl
