= Roncofreddo =

- Comune
- Comune di Roncofreddo
- Coat of arms

- Location within Italy Location within Emilia-Romagna
- Coordinates: 44°2′N 12°19′E
- Country: Italy
- Region: Emilia-Romagna
- Province: Forlì-Cesena
- Frazioni: Ardiano, Cento, Ciola Araldi, Diolaguardia, Felloniche, Gualdo, Monteaguzzo, Montecodruzzo, Montedelleforche, Monteleone, Musano, Oriola, Santa Paola, Sorrivoli, Villa Venti

Government
  - Mayor: Franco Cedioli

Area
  - Total: 51.7 km^{2} (20.0 sq mi)
- Elevation: 314 m (1,030 ft)

Population (31 May 2007)
  - Total: 3,151
  - Density: 60.9/km^{2} (158/sq mi)
- Demonym: Roncofreddesi
- Time zone: UTC+1 (CET)
  - Summer (DST): UTC+2 (CEST)
- Postal code: 47020
- Dialing code: 0541
- Website: Official website

Roncofreddo (Romagnol: Runfrèd or Ronchfrèdd) is a town and comune (municipality) in the Province of Forlì-Cesena in the Italian region Emilia-Romagna, located about 90 kilometres (56 mi) southeast of Bologna and about 30 kilometres (19 mi) southeast of Forlì.

== Montecodruzzo ==
Among its frazioni is Montecodruzzo, at 400 metres (1,300 ft) above mean sea level. The village is known for its remoteness: in Cesena, someone living in a remote area is said to live in Montecodruzzo. The village church, dedicated to Santa Maria Liberatrice, was built in 1572 by Giacomo Malatesta ex-voto for his victory in battle over the Ottoman Empire. An obelisk next to the church, erected after the village's liberation in October 1944, commemorates German soldiers: the German army had told the parish priest, who built the plaque, to evacuate the village before its bombardment.
