= Province of Florence =

Former province of Tuscany, Italy

Coordinates: 43°46′17″N 11°15′15″E

Provincia di Firenze
- Province of Kingdom of Italy and Republic of Italy
- 1865–2014
- Flag Coat of arms

- Map highlighting the location of the province of Florence in Italy
- Capital: Florence
- Area
  - Coordinates
  - 2014: 3,514 km^{2} (1,357 sq mi)
- Population
  - 2014: 1,012,180
- History
  - Established: 1865
  - Disestablished: 31 December 2014
- Today part of: Metropolitan City of Florence

The province of Florence (Italian: provincia di Firenze) was a province in the northeast of Tuscany region of Italy. The city or comune of Florence was both the capital of the province of Florence, and of the Region of Tuscany. It had an area of 3,514 square kilometres (1,357 mi^{2}) and a population of 1,012,180 as of 31 December 2014. The territory of the province was the birthplace of the Italian Renaissance.

In 2015 the province was replaced by the Metropolitan City of Florence.

== Geography ==
The Province of Florence was bordered by the Province of Bologna in the north, the Province of Ravenna and Forlì-Cesena in the north-east, the provinces of Prato, Pistoia, Pisa and Lucca in the west; the Province of Siena in the south and the Province of Arezzo in the east and southeast. Much of the province lied in the plain of the Arno river.

== See also ==
- Metropolitan City of Florence
