= Portico e San Benedetto =

- Comune
- Comune di Portico e San Benedetto
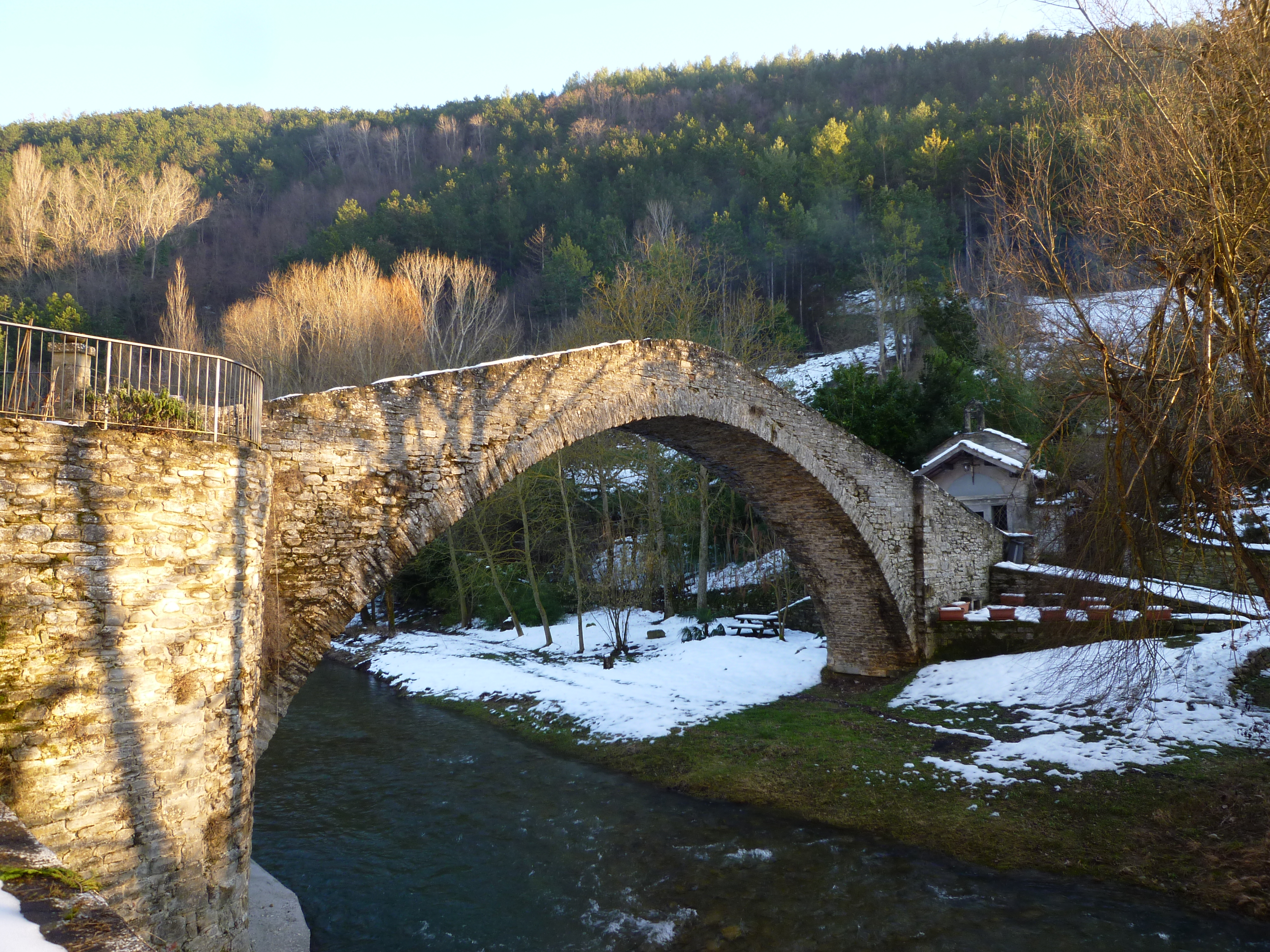
- Ponte della Maestà at Portico di Romagna

- Coat of arms

- Location within Italy Location within Emilia-Romagna
- Coordinates: 44°2′N 11°47′E
- Country: Italy
- Region: Emilia-Romagna
- Province: Forlì-Cesena (FC)
- Frazioni: Bocconi, Portico di Romagna, San Benedetto in Alpe

Government
  - Mayor: Maurizio Monti

Area
  - Total: 60.8 km^{2} (23.5 sq mi)
- Elevation: 456 m (1,496 ft)

Population (Dec. 2019)Dato Istat - Resident population.
  - Total: 734
  - Density: 12.1/km^{2} (31.3/sq mi)
- Time zone: UTC+1 (CET)
  - Summer (DST): UTC+2 (CEST)
- Postal code: 47010
- Dialing code: 0543
- Website: Official website

Portico e San Benedetto (Romagnol: Pôrtic e San Bandét) is a comune (municipality) in the province of Forlì-Cesena, in the Italian region of Emilia-Romagna, located about 60 kilometres (37 mi) southeast of Bologna.

It is formed by three main distinct settlements:

- Portico di Romagna, 36 kilometres (22 mi) from Forlì
- San Benedetto in Alpe, 48 kilometres (30 mi) from Forlì
- Bocconi, midway the two former localities

== Main sights ==
In Bocconi:

- Ponte della Brusia, an 18th-century three arch bridge

In Portico di Romagna:

- Palazzo Portinari, which, according to tradition, belonged to Folco Portinari's large, extensive family, father of the Beatrice Portinari described by Dante Alighieri
- Palazzo Traversari. The theologian Ambrogio Traversari was born here.
- Ponte della Maestà ("Majesty Bridge", 17th–18th centuries)

In San Benedetto in Alpe:

- Acquacheta water fall on the river of the same name, also described by Dante Alighieri in his Divine Comedy (Inferno, Canto XVI, 100–101)
- Monastery of St. Benedict, of medieval origins
