= Province of Forlì-Cesena =

Province of Italy

Coordinates: 44°13′21″N 12°2′27″E

Province of Forlì-Cesena Provincia di Forlì-Cesena (Italian)
- Province
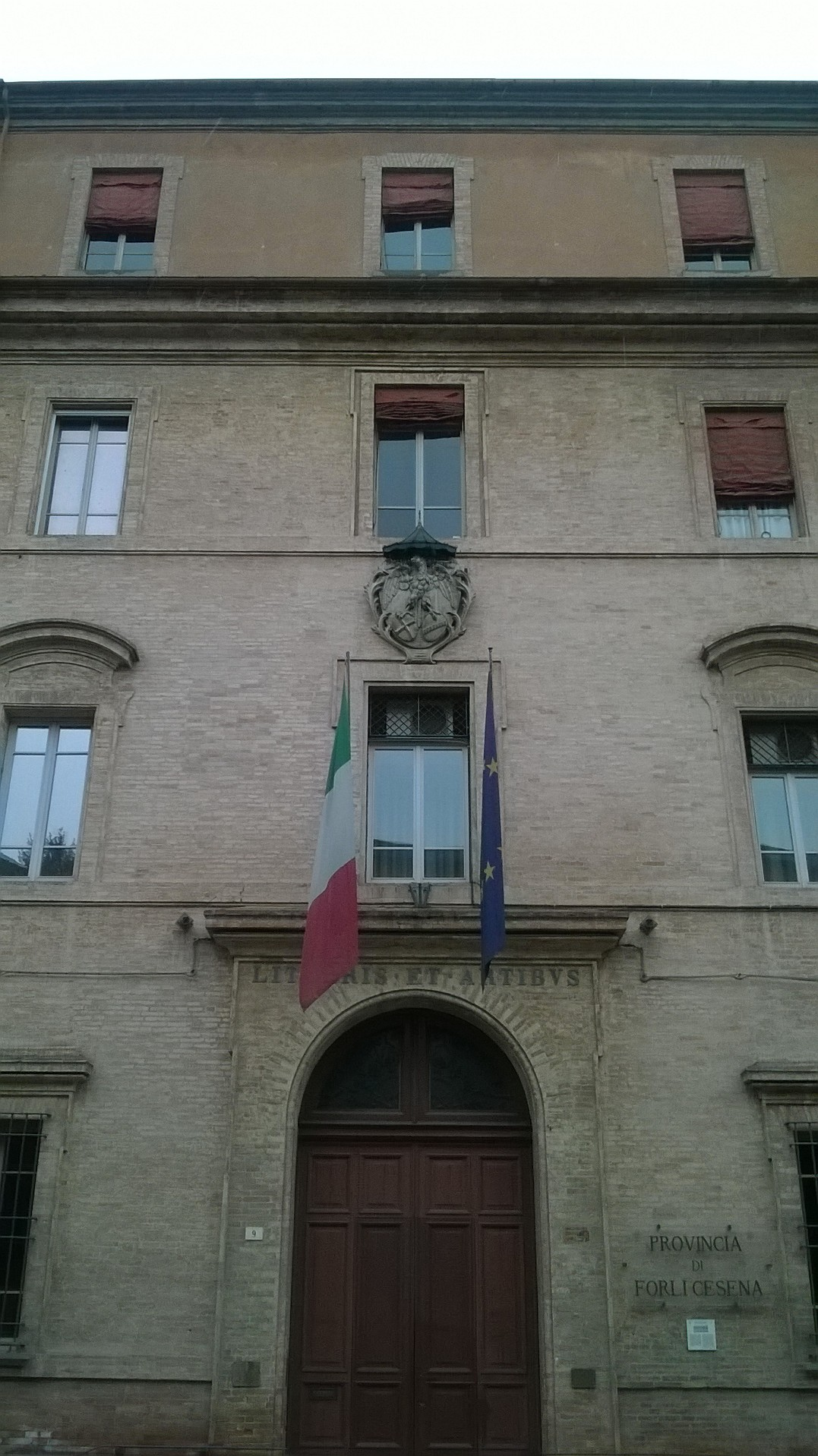
- Palazzo dei Signori della Missione, the provincial seat

- Flag Coat of arms

- Location of the province of Forlì-Cesena in Italy
- Country: Italy
- Region: Emilia-Romagna
- Capital(s): Forlì and Cesena
- Municipalities: 30

Government
  - President: Enzo Lattuca

Area
  - Total: 2,378.40 km^{2} (918.31 sq mi)

Population (2026)
  - Total: 394,337
  - Density: 165.799/km^{2} (429.418/sq mi)

GDP
  - Total: €12.157 billion (2015)
  - Per capita: €30,758 (2015)
- Time zone: UTC+1 (CET)
  - Summer (DST): UTC+2 (CEST)
- Postal code: 47121-47122 Forlì, 47521-47522 Cesena, 47010-47043 elsewhere (except 47023)
- Telephone prefix: 0543, 0547
- Vehicle registration: FO, FC
- ISTAT code: 040

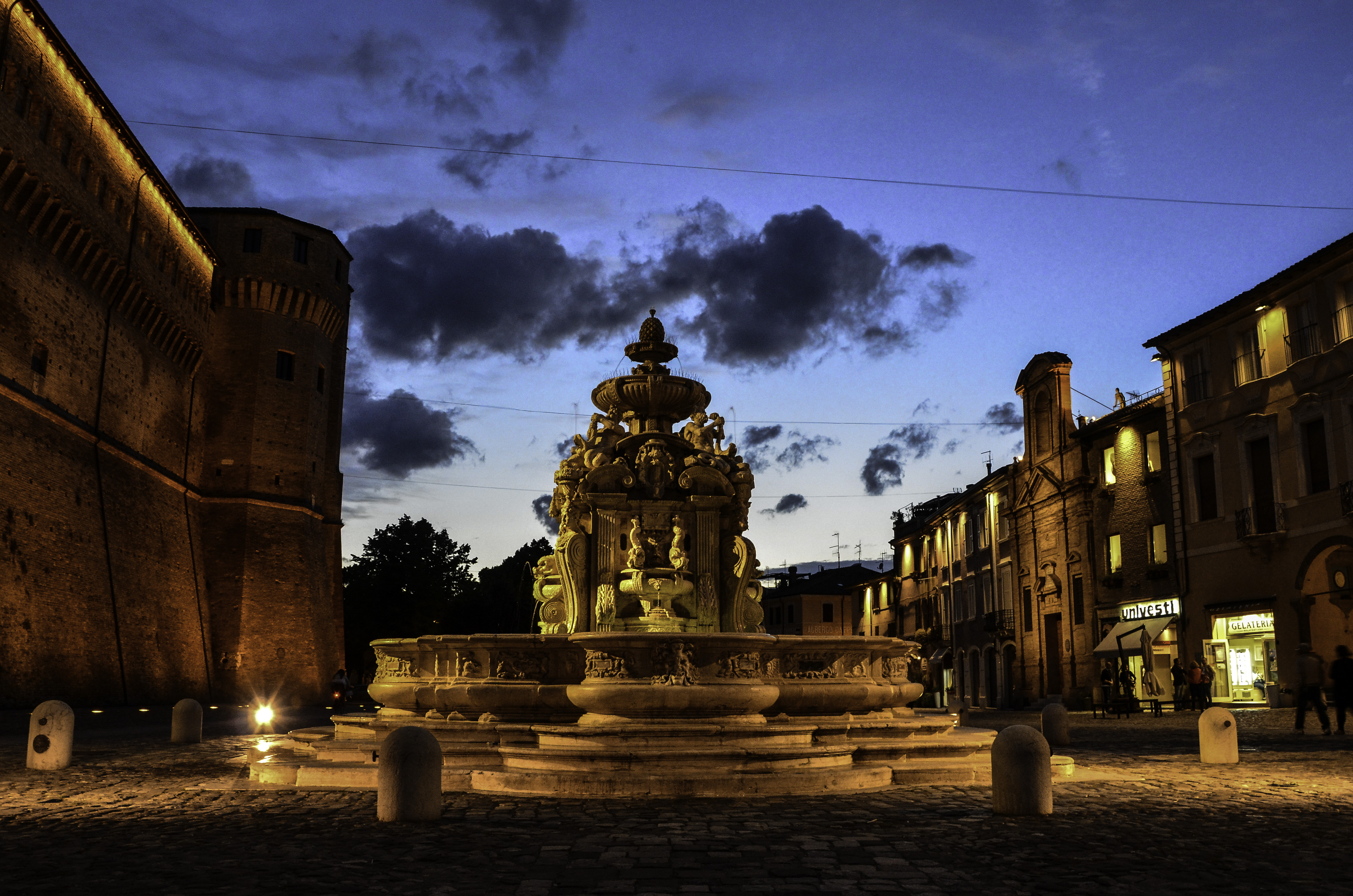
Piazza del Popolo in Cesena

The Province of Forlì-Cesena (Italian: Provincia di Forlì-Cesena) is a province in the region of Emilia-Romagna in Italy. Its capitals are the cities of Forlì and Cesena.

The province has a population of 394,337 in an area of 2,378.40 square kilometres (918.31 sq mi) across its 30 municipalities.

The provincial president is Davide Drei. Although located close to the independent Republic of San Marino, Forlì-Cesena does not share a land border with the sovereign state.

== History ==
Forlì was founded by the Roman consul Marcus Livius Salinator, and it was connected to the Via Aemilia in 188 BCE. By the 12th century CE, it had become a Ghibelline commune and military garrison. The Holy See initiated a small attempt to rule Forlì in 1278, but the family of Ordelaffi led the city from 1315 until 1480. The city was later governed by Girolamo Riario and his wife, Caterina Sforza; during this period, the Holy See attempted to regain control but was unsuccessful. Spanish Pope Alexander VI ordered his son Cesare Borgia, Duke of Valentinois, to Forlì and other communes in the region; Borgia successfully gained control of Forlì in 1500, but lost it in 1503, after the death of Alexander VI. Until the formation of the Kingdom of Italy, it remained under the rule of the Holy See.

Cesena was first owned by the Romans until the fall of Rome when it was taken by the Byzantine Empire. Following this, it was owned by archbishops of Ravenna. During the period of issues between the Guelphs and Ghibellines, the Holy See took over Cesena from the Ordelaffis. Antipope Clement VII's troops almost completely destroyed Cesena in 1377, and the Pope gave the city to the House of Malatesta. After the House of Malatesta controlled the city from 1378 to 1465, the Holy See regained control of Cesena. Leonardo da Vinci designed the port Cesenatico. It remained under papal rule until Italy was unified.

In 1921, there was a rapid advance of the Fascist movement in the region triggered by issues connected with agrarian reform. Buildings belonging to the republicans and socialists were seized or burnt down by Italo Balbo, and on July 29, he and his men moved throughout the provinces of Ravenna and Forlì, burning every socialist organisation headquarters in a night of terror which was later called the "column of fire". This was a pivotal moment in the advance of Fascism in northern Italy.

On 16 April 1992, the Province of Rimini was formed from the Province of Forlì's southwestern municipalities. The remaining part of the Province of Forlì was renamed the Province of Forlì-Cesena.

== Geography ==
The province of Forlì-Cesena is one of nine provinces in the region of Emilia-Romagna in the northeast of Italy. Along with that of Rimini, it is the most southerly of the provinces in the region and it abuts onto the Adriatic Sea for a short distance. The province of Ravenna lies to the north. To the west lies the Metropolitan City of Florence and, further south, the province of Arezzo, both in the region of Tuscany. In the southeast the province borders on the province of Rimini. The role of the provincial capital is shared by the two cities of Cesena and Forlì, the latter of which is situated on the bank of the Montone river about 70 km (43 mi) southeast of Bologna.

== Government ==
=== Municipalities ===
The province has 30 municipalities:

- Bagno di Romagna
- Bertinoro
- Borghi
- Castrocaro Terme e Terra del Sole
- Cesena
- Cesenatico
- Civitella di Romagna
- Dovadola
- Forlì
- Forlimpopoli
- Galeata
- Gambettola
- Gatteo
- Longiano
- Meldola
- Mercato Saraceno
- Modigliana
- Montiano
- Portico e San Benedetto
- Predappio
- Premilcuore
- Rocca San Casciano
- Roncofreddo
- San Mauro Pascoli
- Santa Sofia
- Sarsina
- Savignano sul Rubicone
- Sogliano al Rubicone
- Tredozio
- Verghereto

== Demographics ==
As of 2026, the population is 394,337, of which 49.2% are male, and 50.8% are female. Minors make up 14.4% of the population, and seniors make up 25.8%.

Historical population

Year	Pop.	±%
1861	186,885	—
1871	200,300	+7.2%
1881	211,481	+5.6%
1901	236,409	+11.8%
1911	252,582	+6.8%
1921	271,224	+7.4%
1931	292,083	+7.7%
1936	301,546	+3.2%

Year	Pop.	±%
1951	324,138	+7.5%
1961	326,476	+0.7%
1971	334,460	+2.4%
1981	349,092	+4.4%
1991	348,647	−0.1%
2001	358,542	+2.8%
2011	390,738	+9.0%
2021	391,293	+0.1%

Source: ISTAT

=== Immigration ===
As of 2025, immigrants make up 14.7% of the population. The 5 largest foreign countries of birth are Albania, Romania, Morocco, Ukraine, and China.

== International relations ==
=== Twin towns — sister cities ===
The Province of Forlì-Cesena is twinned with:

- Dongcheng District, Beijing, China, since 2012
