= Source-Seine =

- Commune
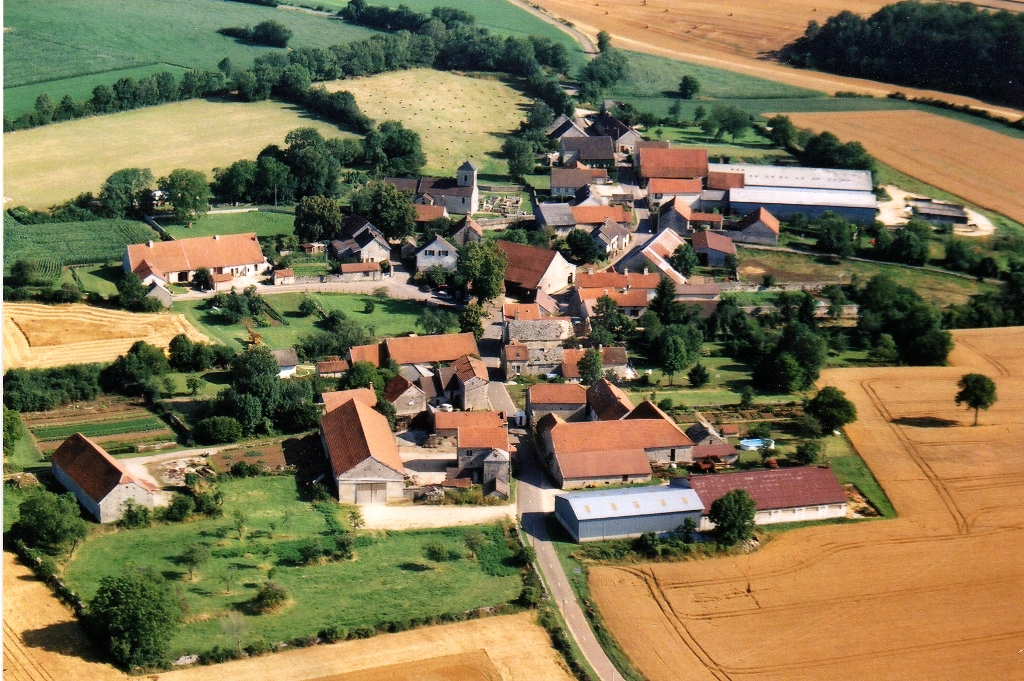
- An aerial view of Saint-Germain
- Location of Source-Seine
- Location within France Location within Bourgogne-Franche-Comté
- Coordinates: 47°30′03″N 4°41′48″E
- Country: France
- Region: Bourgogne-Franche-Comté
- Department: Côte-d'Or
- Arrondissement: Montbard
- Canton: Montbard
- Intercommunality: Pays d'Alésia et de la Seine

Government
  - Mayor (2020–2026): Sophie Louet
- Area^{1}: 16.41 km^{2} (6.34 sq mi)
- Highest elevation: 523 m (1,716 ft)
- Lowest elevation: 354 m (1,161 ft)
- Population (2023): 60
  - Density: 3.7/km^{2} (9.5/sq mi)
- Demonym: Sequanien or Sequanienne
- Time zone: UTC+01:00 (CET)
  - Summer (DST): UTC+02:00 (CEST)
- INSEE/Postal code: 21551 /21690
- ^{1} French Land Register data, which excludes lakes, ponds, glaciers > 1 km^{2} (0.386 sq mi or 247 acres) and river estuaries.

Source-Seine (French pronunciation: [suʁs sɛn]), known as Source Seine during the first few months after its formation, is a commune in the Côte-d'Or department in eastern France.

It was formed on 1 January 2009 when Saint-Germain-Source-Seine was merged with Blessey.

Its demonym is Sequanien (masculine/mixed plural) or Sequanienne (feminine), most likely named after Sequana, the goddess of the river Seine.

== Geography ==
Source-Seine is located 30 kilometres (19 mi) northwest of Dijon.

There are two hameaux or hamlets in Source-Seine : Saint-Germain (originally Saint-Germain-Source-Seine), and Blessey.

True to its name, within Source-Seine is the source of the Seine, in woods off the D103 road approximately 2 km Southeast by east of the cluster of buildings in Saint-Germain, or 3 km East by south of the cluster of buildings in Blessey. The Seine rises at an elevation of 470 metres (1,542 ft) in this wooded area, from waters in several closely clustered ditches/depressions. France's second-longest river (after the Loire), the Seine then flows 776 kilometres (482 mi) before it passes between the coastal communes of Le Havre and Honfleur, on the Normandy coast, into the English Channel.

Source-Seine borders the communes of Frôlois to the north-west, Chanceaux to the north, Poncey-sur-l'Ignon to the north-east, Bligny-le-Sec to the south-east, Salmaise to the south and Boux-sous-Salmaise to the south-west.

== History ==
What is now Source-Seine saw Gaulic pilgrimage beginning in the 1st century BC. In the late 4th century AD, Roman Emperor Theodosius I ordered the closure of pagan temples at the Seine's source and gave their property to Christian institutions. In accordance with this edict, in the 5th century the abbey of Sainte-Marie-de-Cestra, the closest religious institution to the Seine's source, received a donation from the Roman government.

In the 17th century, rumors of healing powers in the Seine were circulating around Paris. This led to the construction of a grotto dedicated to the Seine Nymph and financed by its residents in the 19th century. The city of Paris officially bought the source of the Seine in 1864. Modern times have seen a wave of coin throwers flocking to the river's source.

The commune of Source-Seine was formed on 1 January 2009 when Saint-Germain-Source-Seine was fused with Blessey.

=== Name history ===
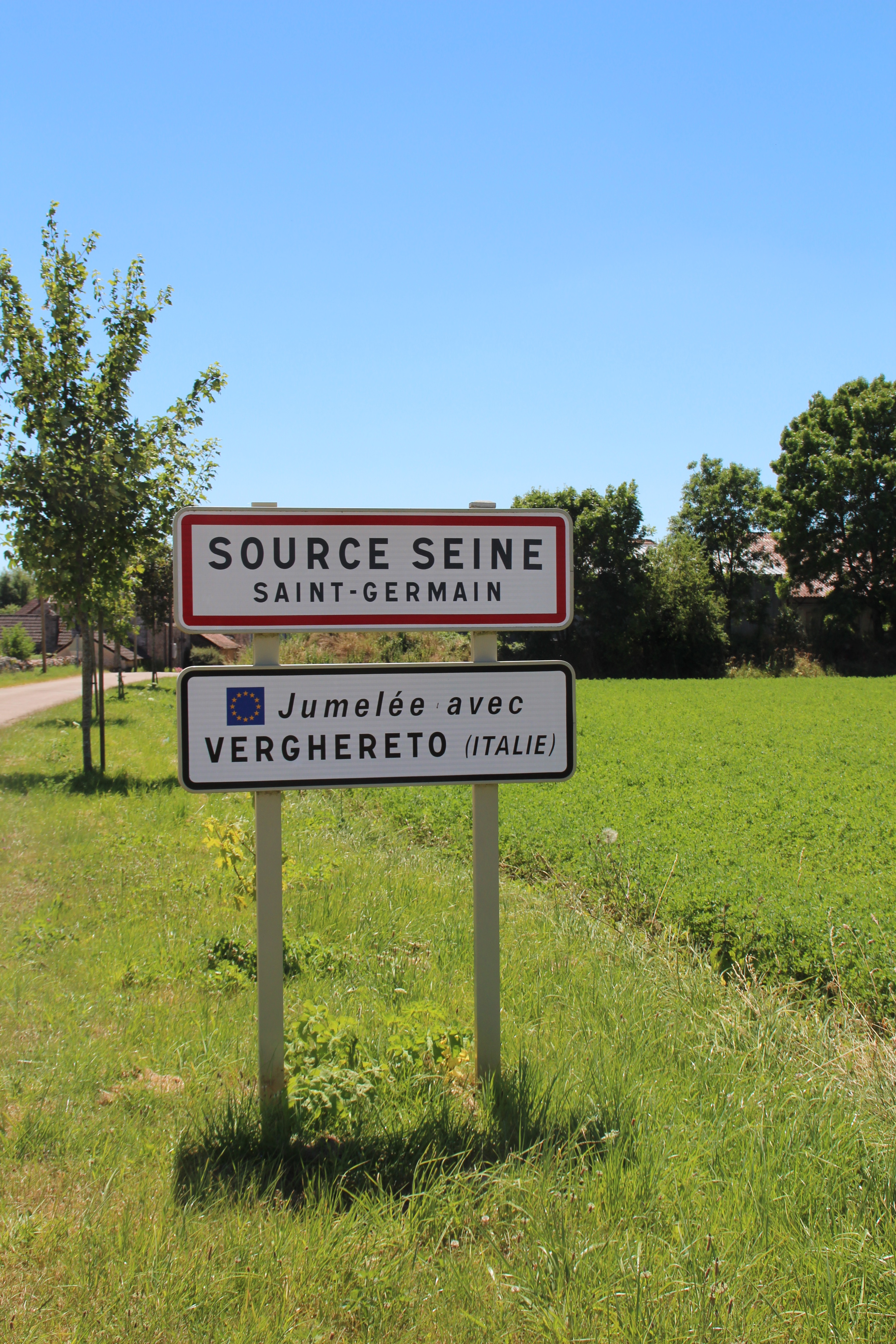
A sign at the entrance to the town, displaying the incorrect name originally used

The name Source-Seine originated during the French Revolution when the ruling of 22 frimaire of year II of the French First Republic (12 December 1793) stipulated that a commune could not be named after a saint or contain any religious references. As a result, the name of Saint-Germain-Source-Seine (which was then called Sainct Germain la Fæuille or Saint-Germain-la-Feuille) was changed to Source-Seine. The municipal order stated that 'the name of the commune of Saint-Germain-la-Feuille will change to the name of Source-Seine, taking this name from the way the Seine river has its source on the territory of the commune.' Saint-Germain-Source-Seine was renamed Saint-Germain-la-Feuille in 1815 during the Bourbon Restoration. In 1868, the town council requested that the words 'la-Feuille' be replaced by 'Source-Seine', which they were following a decree by President MacMahon on 22 July 1875.

The name Source-Seine was revived when Saint-Germain-Source-Seine was merged with Blessey. After Saint-Germain-Source-Seine and Blessey merged, following a local consultation, the prefectoral decree and the Journal Officiel de la République Française referred to the commune as Source Seine (without a hyphen), which was against the rules regarding the naming of political and administrative entities. The JORF quickly corrected the name and changed it to Source-Seine, and the Code officiel géographique followed.

== Politics and administration ==
Successive list of mayors

- 2009-2010 - Jean-Louis Bornier, independent, teacher
- 2011-2014 - Marie-Jeanne Fournier, independent, activity leader
- 2014-2026 - Sophie Louet, independent, salesperson

== Economy ==
The area around Source-Seine is noted for its wine. Grain and livestock are also farmed there, as well as the area being attractive to tourists.

== Places of interest ==
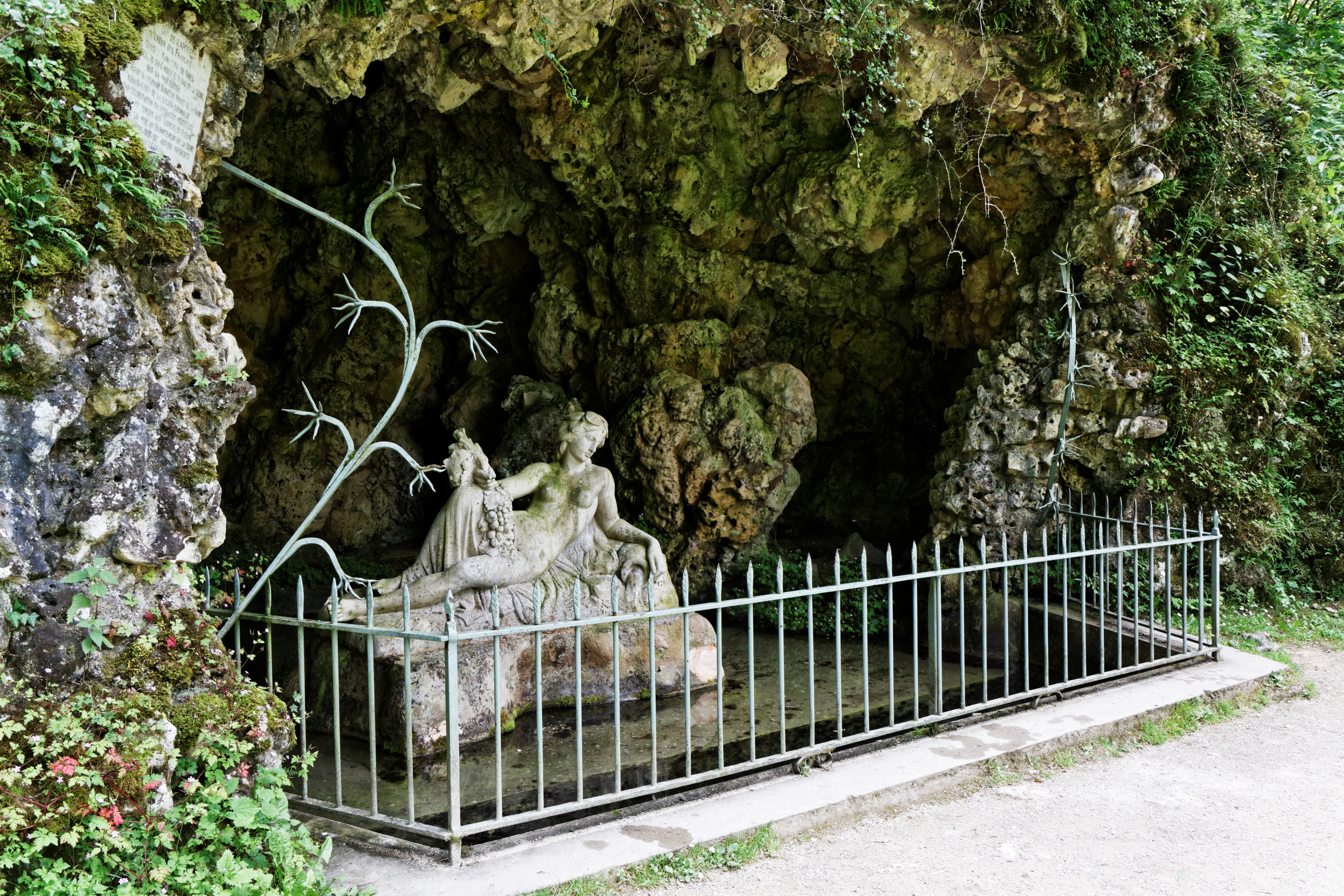
The nymph statue at the source of the Seine river, in the Sources de la Seine park

- Sources de la Seine, a park owned by the city of Paris which contains the source of the river Seine and the first bridges across the river, including a nymph statue at the source of the river. The park is popular with tourists.
- Notre-Dame church, with a 12th-century choir with arrowslits, an 18th-century nave and a bell tower. There is a stone with a Gallo-Roman inscription, originally from the Gallo-Roman sanctuary at the sources of the Seine and reused.
- Sainte-Anne of Blessey chapel.
- Three statues made of multicolored wood.
- 8th century sarcophagi, made with reused stone, on the walls of the cemetery.
- Cemetery with a 12th-century sculpture of Christ's head embedded in the wall near the entry, and a 17th-century cross.
- 18th century calvaries at crossroads, one next to the 'tilleul de la liberté' (freedom tree, planted to signify freedoms gained in the French Revolution) and another in front of the Diocese house.
- Lime trees dated from the 18th century, including one planted during the French Revolution, referred to as 'arbre de la Liberté'.
- Two monuments commemorating WWI deaths, one for Saint-Germain and the other for Blessey.
- Wash house at Blessey.

== Sister towns ==
- Verghereto (Italy) since 2002. The commune of Saint-Germain-Source-Seine signed a 'Charte d'amitié' (friendship charter) with the commune of Verghereto in 2001 and a sister town agreement in 2002. The commune of Source-Seine has been twinned with Verghereto since the fusion of the two communes. The source of the Tiber, the river that passes through Rome (which is a sister city of Paris) is located in Verghereto. The partnership is therefore between two communes which contain the sources of rivers that traverse European capital cities.

== See also ==
- Communes of the Côte-d'Or department
