= Savio (river) =

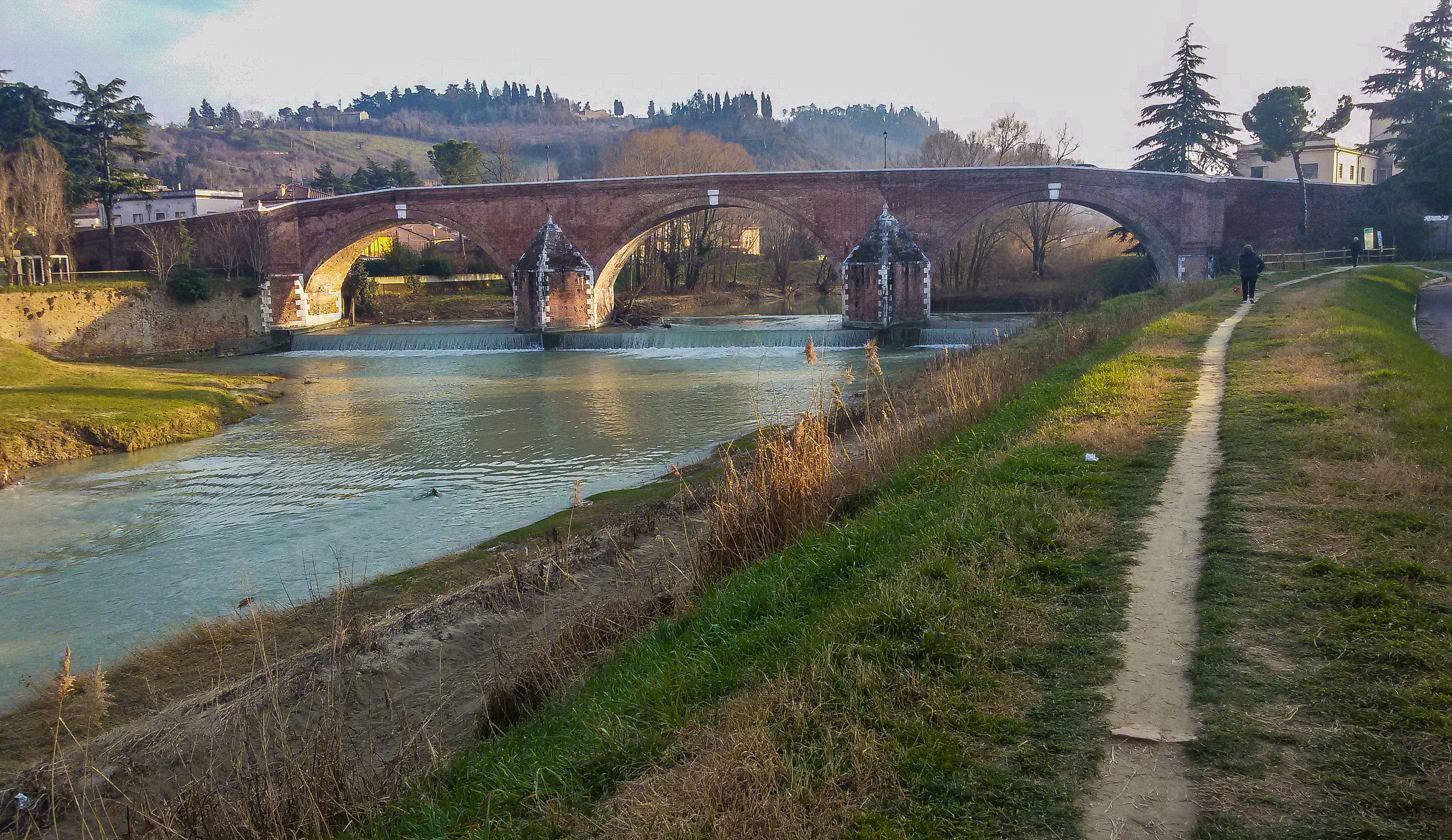
- The Savio at Cesena

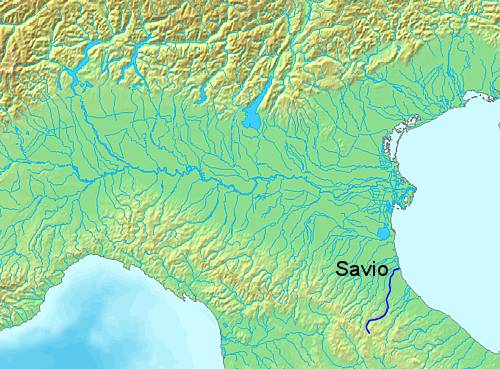

Location
- Country: Italy

Physical characteristics
- Source
  - location: Mount Castelvecchio near Montecoronaro
  - elevation: 1,126 m (3,694 ft)
- Mouth
  - location: Adriatic Sea near Lido di Savio
  - coordinates: 44°19′10″N 12°20′30″E
- Length: 126 km (78 mi)
- Discharge
  - average: 6 m^{3}/s (210 cu ft/s)

The Savio is a river in the Emilia-Romagna region of northern Italy. Its source is in the province of Forlì-Cesena near Montecoronaro on Mount Castelvecchio which is near the western side of Mount Fumaiolo. The source is at an elevation of 1,126 metres (3,694 ft) and is marked by an iron monument. A wolf (the symbol of Montecoronaro) and the rings of the caveja (a symbol of Romagna) are on this monument. The river flows near Verghereto and Bagno di Romagna as it winds through the mountains before entering Lago di Quarto. After leaving the lake, the river flows northeast near Sarsina (near the border with the province of Pesaro and Urbino) and Mercato Saraceno before flowing north. The river winds for 96 kilometres (60 mi) along the valley. Its natural track has been preserved relatively well and, in the territory of Cesena, it shows an environment which is one of the purest of the whole Romagna. North of Cesena, the river crosses the border into the province of Ravenna. After a total course of 126 kilometres (78 mi) the river enters the Adriatic Sea north of Cervia by Lido di Classe and Lido di Savio.

The River Savio Natural Park, 6-kilometre (3.7 mi) along a loop which once hosted a cave, starts from the two historical bridges of Cesena.

The park contains many species of animals and plants. The trees divide the area in two belts: the one near the waters contains white willows with black and white poplars; the second presents locust-trees.

Although the park is relatively small, many animals are visible here, both birds (herons, king-fishers, woodpeckers and raptors) and mammals (hares, porcupines, foxes, and roe deer).

== See also ==
- Savio River Reserve
