= Verghereto =

- Comune
- Comune di Verghereto
- Location within Italy Location within Emilia-Romagna
- Coordinates: 43°48′N 11°58′E
- Country: Italy
- Region: Emilia-Romagna
- Province: Forlì-Cesena (FC)
- Frazioni: Alfero, Balze, Capanna, Castellane, Castelpriore, Ceregiacoli, Colorio, Corneto, Donicilio, Falera, La Strada, Mazzi, Montecoronaro, Montione, Nasseto, Para, Pastorale, Pereto, Piantrebbio, Renicci, Riofreddo, Ronco dell'Asino, S. Alessio, Tavolicci, Trappola, Velle, Villa di Corneto, Ville di Montecoronaro

Area
  - Total: 117 km^{2} (45 sq mi)
- Elevation: 812 m (2,664 ft)

Population (31 May 2007)
  - Total: 1,960
  - Density: 16.8/km^{2} (43.4/sq mi)
- Demonym: Vergheretini
- Time zone: UTC+1 (CET)
  - Summer (DST): UTC+2 (CEST)
- Postal code: 47028
- Dialing code: 0543
- Website: Official website

Verghereto (Romagnol: Vargaréd; Tuscan: Vergareto (rare)) is a comune (municipality) in the Province of Forlì-Cesena in the Italian region Emilia-Romagna, located about 90 kilometres (56 mi) southeast of Bologna and about 50 kilometres (31 mi) south of Forlì.

The main parish church is San Michele Arcangelo, Verghereto.

== Twin towns ==
Verghereto is twinned with the following towns:

- Source-Seine, France, since 2002. Verghereto was originally a twin town of Saint-Germain-Source-Seine prior to the commune's fusion with Blessey on 1 January 2009 to form Source-Seine, when Verghereto became a twin town of Source-Seine. The commune of Saint-Germain-Source-Seine and the commune of Verghereto signed a friendship charter in 2001 and a sister town agreement in 2002. As the source of the Tiber is located in Verghereto and the source of the Seine is located in Source-Seine, the partnership is therefore between two communes which contain the sources of rivers that traverse European capital cities.
- Melissano, Italy, since 2007
