= Sequana =

Gallo-Roman goddess of the Seine

- Goddess of the Seine and of healing
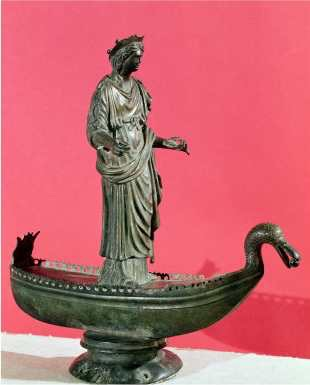
- Gallo-Roman sculpture of Sequana in a duck boat
- Venerated in: Northern France by Gaulish tribes and Gallo-Romans after the Conquest of Gaul
- Major cult centre: The principal source of the Seine in northern Burgundy
- Symbol: Water
- Temple: Northern Burgundy at the source of the Seine River

In Gallo-Roman religion, Sequana is the goddess of the river Seine, particularly the springs at the source of the Seine. Although the origins of the goddess are Celtic, Sequana was subsequently integrated into a Gallo-Roman regional cult of worship after the Roman conquest of Gaul. The main sites dedicated to her are found in northern Burgundy, especially at the source of the Seine, where archeological excavations have unearthed a temple complex and over a thousand votive offerings.

== Cult, religion and oracles ==
The cult of Sequana is closely linked to a primary element: water. Indeed, the sacredness of water is central to the veneration of Sequana, who was also a goddess of healing. The main sanctuary was located at the principal source of the Seine River, near the town of Châtillon-sur-Seine in the Burgundy region. These springs are called the Fontes Sequanae (the Springs of Sequana).

Thanks to archeological excavations conducted from 1836 to 1967, it is now possible to trace the physical development of the sanctuary. In the 2nd or 1st century BCE, a healing shrine was built by the Gauls consisting of a "simple square chamber, presumably housing a figure of the goddess, surrounded by an open porch where worshippers could assemble." Around AD 50, a masonry channel was built that fed a catchment area. Next, additional buildings were built following a "grand plan, executed in a space about 300 feet [91 meters] long." This complex consisted of a long building with seven rooms that were probably used by officiating priests. In addition, farther "to the north, a monumental entryway of four pillars led the pilgrims into a long courtyard. The eastern side of the courtyard was occupied by a covered colonnade that sheltered a porch.... At the northern end of the courtyard three steps led down to the spring, the channel from the spring and the catchment basin."

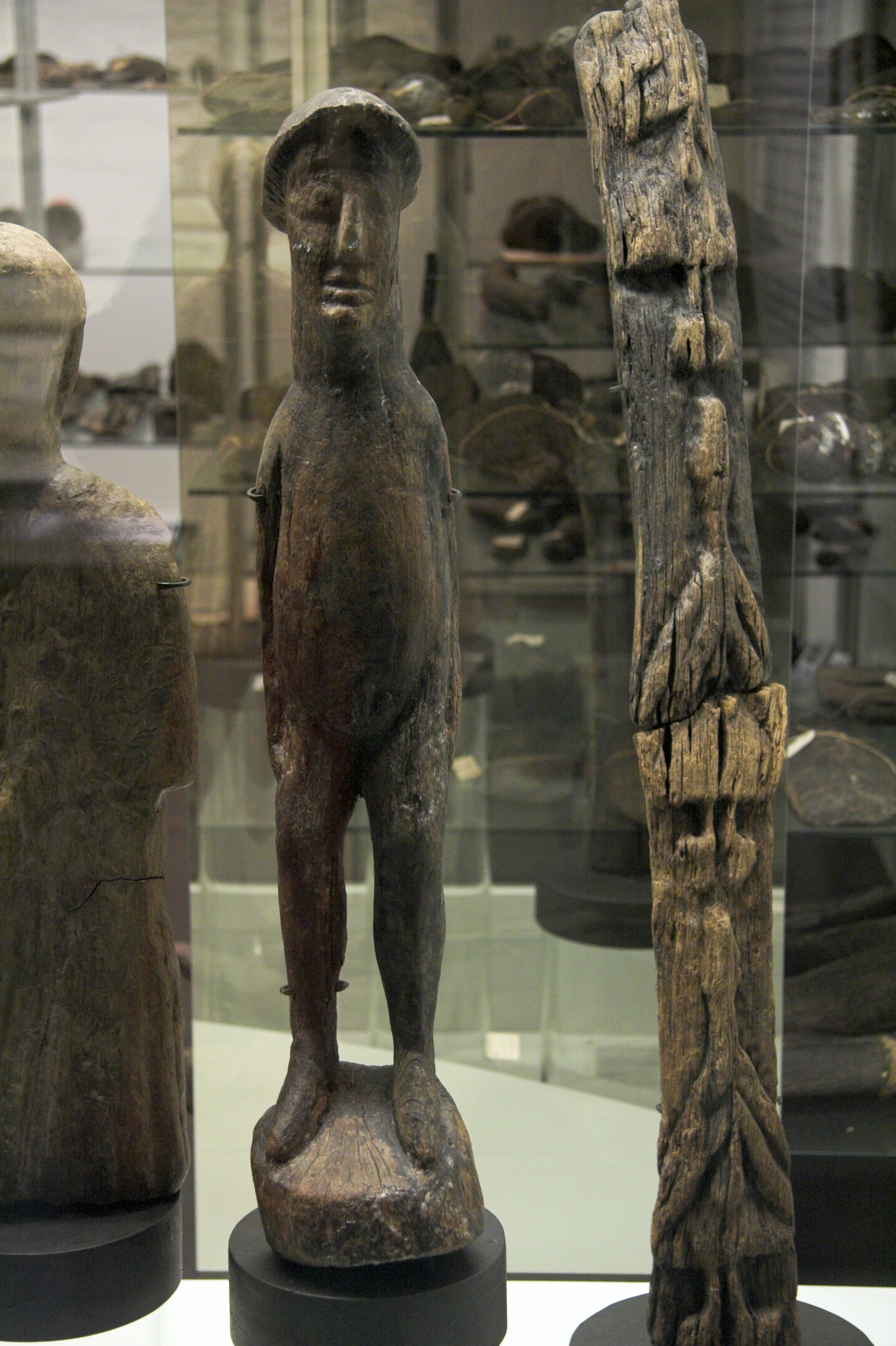
Votive offering from about 80 BC from Sequana's sanctuary, now housed in the Archeological Museum of Dijon

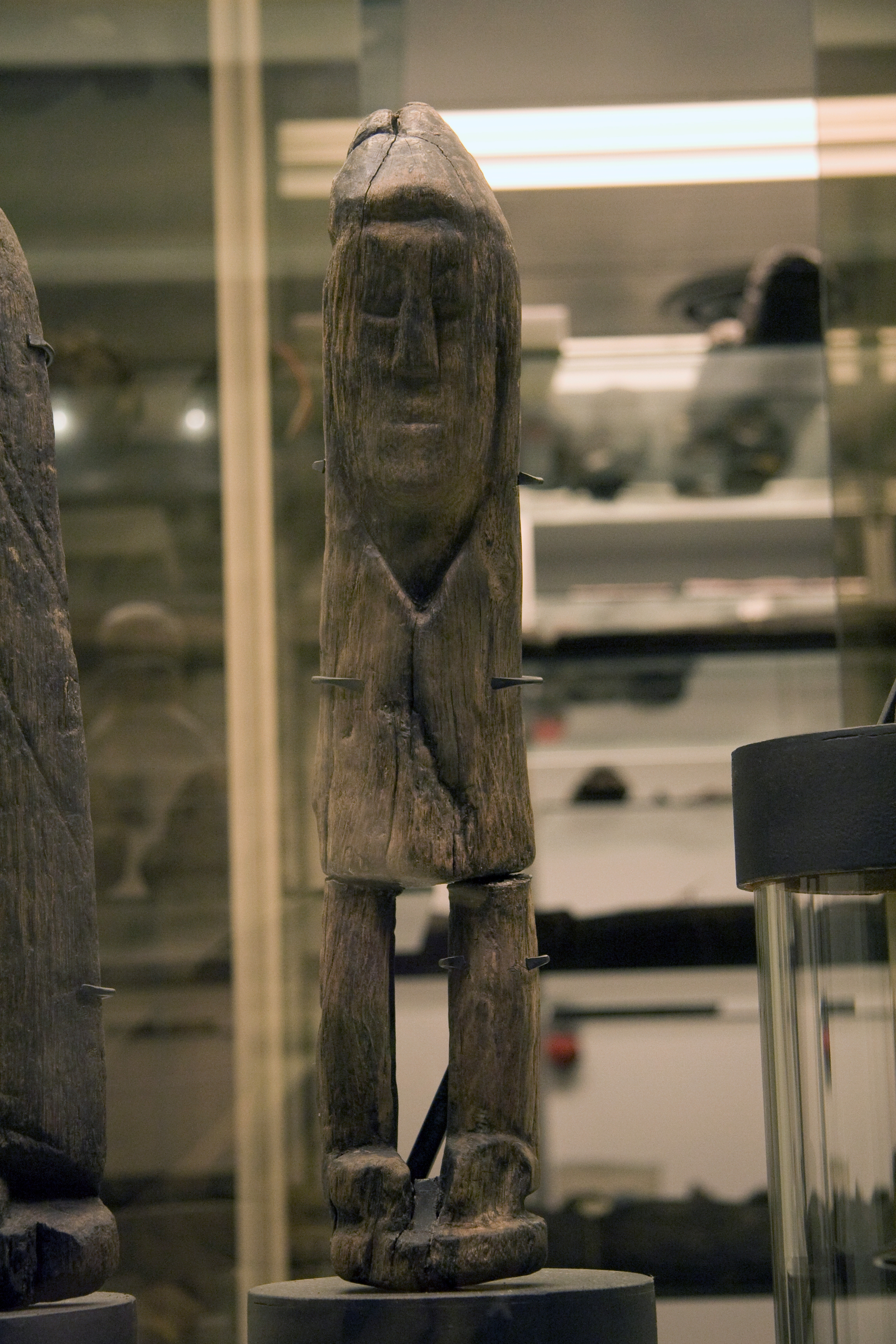
Another votive offering from about 80 BC, now displayed in the Archeological Museum of Dijon.

Evidence found during the excavations shows that devotees went on pilgrimages to this sanctuary in order to solicit Sequana's help to restore health or to thank her for past assistance. Arriving at the sanctuary, the pilgrims gave votive offerings to accompany their solicitations. It has been possible to identify from inscriptions on these offerings the social roles of a few of the visitors to the sanctuary. They include a slave, a male 'citizen' and several women (including four 'pilgrims' and a female 'citizen'). The excavations unearthed some 1,500 stone, bronze, and wood votive offerings, many of them depicting body parts such as eyes, limbs, sexual organs and internal organs. Archeologists hypothesize that these votive offerings depicted injuries or illnesses that would hopefully be cured through the divine intervention of the goddess. Pilgrims were also frequently depicted in the small sculptures as carrying offerings to the goddess, including money, fruit, or a favourite pet dog or bird. The excavation findings include:

- A large clay pot bearing the inscription 'Deae Sequana(e) Rufus donavit' (Rufus gives this to the goddess Sequana). The pot contained a smaller pot filled with 800 bronze coins from the third and fourth century as well as some 120 votive offering in bronze. It is not thought that these offerings were made by Rufus himself (120 ex votos would have been a lot for one man), but instead that subsequent looters stored their loot in the pot and then buried it in order to hide it.
- Wooden sculptures – life-size human figures carved from tree limbs – were found where they had been thrown into what was then a marsh, but was later filled with earth. The sculptures survived because the water logged soil prevented them from decaying due to lack of oxygen. The wood was preserved using a water replacement procedure that required immersing the objects in a water solution of polyethylene glycol that gradually replaced the water in every cell cavity.

The 1,500 votive offerings tell us something about the sanctuary and its pilgrims. Based on the body parts depicted in the offerings, respiratory illnesses and eye diseases appear to have been common. The archeological evidence shows that many of these offerings were mass produced, so that the sanctuary may have hosted a bustling commerce in ex votos. The large number of offerings found during the excavations suggests that pilgrims were numerous.

Archeologists also believe, based on the inscriptions, that oracles were offered at the site, either by Sequana herself or by invoking her.

== Representations ==
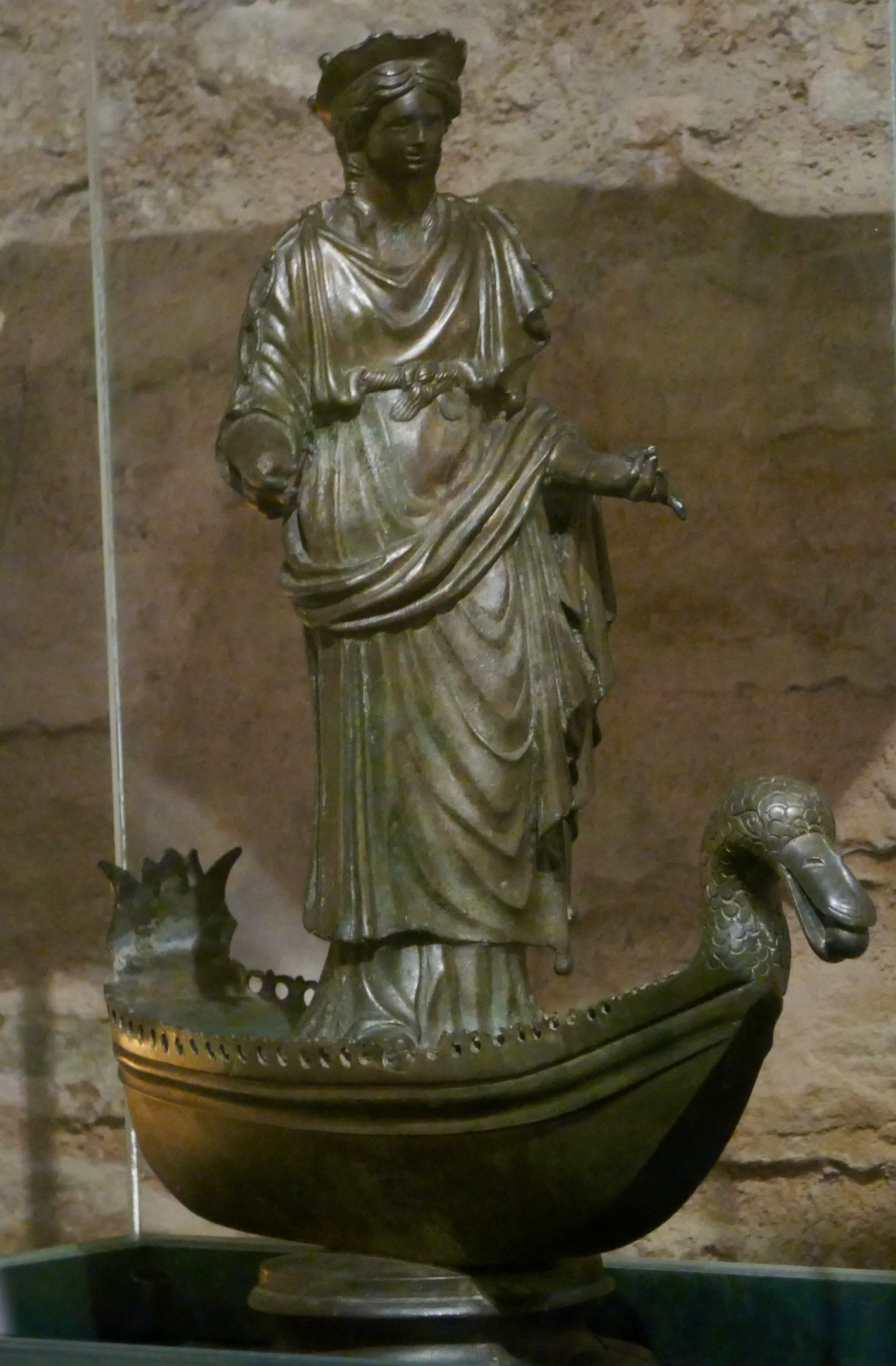
Bronze statue of the Gallo-Roman goddess Sequana found at the site of her sanctuary in northern Burgundy and now housed in the archaeological museum at Dijon

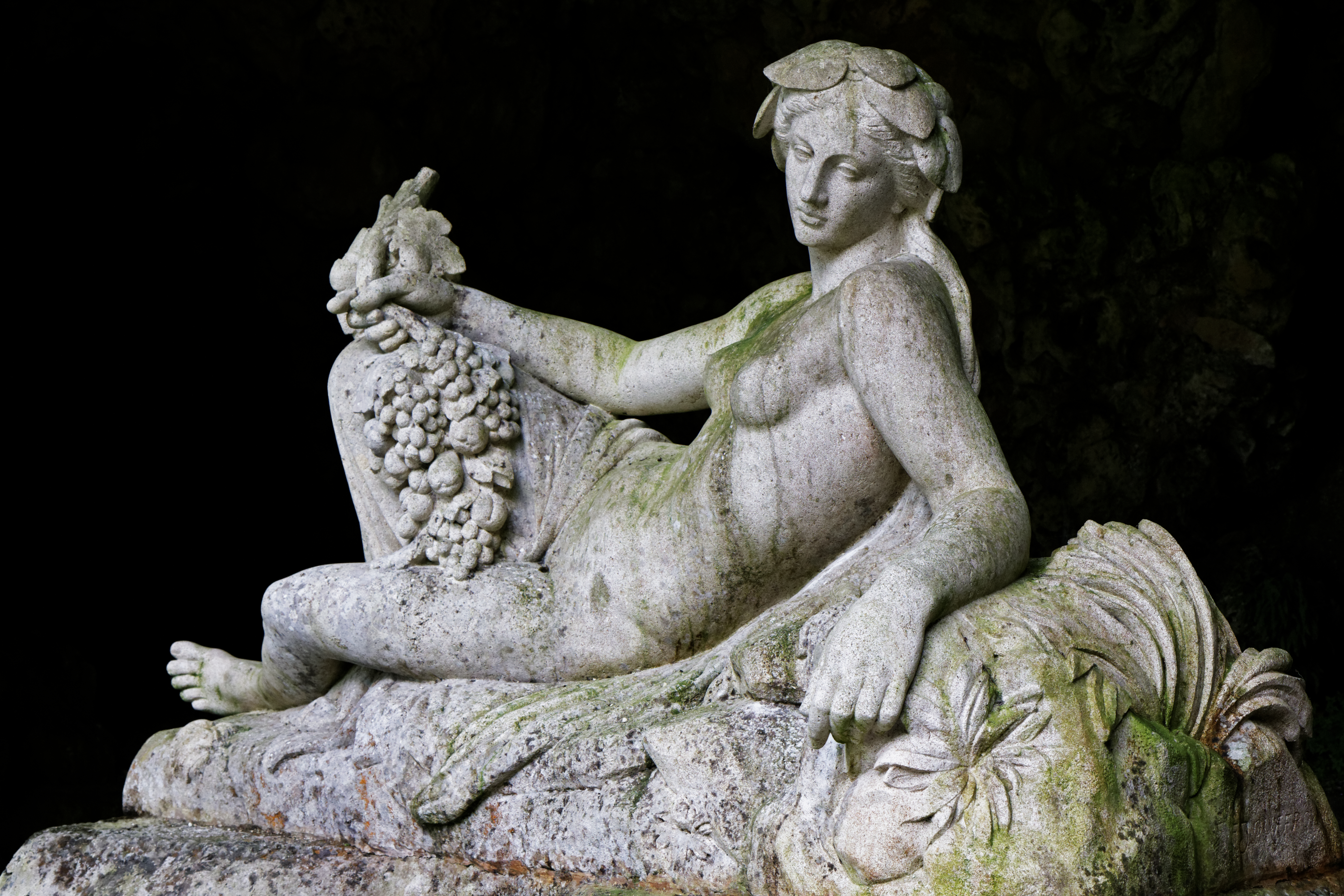
Modern sculpture of Sequana executed by Paul Auban. In 1934, the statue was installed in the nineteenth century park created by the city of Paris on the site of the sanctuary.

A bronze statue of a woman, draped in a long gown and with a diadem on her head, represents Sequana. The statue was found with that of a faun in 1933 by Henri Corot. The goddess stands on a boat, the prow of which is in the form of the head of a duck with a ball in its mouth. The approximately 1 foot (30 cm) tall statue is now in the Musée archéologique de Dijon.

In 1864, the city of Paris bought the land surrounding the source of the Seine in order to build a park that would honour the river that is of such importance to the city. Under the impetus of Baron Haussmann, the city created the park the following year and erected an artificial cave intended to protect the site. Also placed within the source itself was a statue of Sequana by the Dijon sculptor François Jouffroy. The original, severely damaged by the elements, was replaced in 1934 by a copy executed by Paul Auban.

== Inscriptions ==
An analysis of inscriptions found at Sequana's sanctuary show a total of 13 inscriptions, of which at least nine specifically name the goddess. The inscriptions also shed of some light on religious practices at the site. One inscription notes the presence of a sacerdoce Augusti, a priest of the imperial cult dedicated to the worship of the Roman emperors. Mentions of Auguste are common, but often incomprehensible to modern readers. In addition, it would seem that some pilgrims were not well educated or spoke imperfect Latin because many inscriptions are awkwardly formulated. The study also shows an additional mention of Sequana in an inscription found in the village of Salmaise.

The list below reproduces selected inscriptions from an inventory of Gallo-Roman inscriptions collected by the Commission de Topographie des Gaules under Napoleon III and housed in the Archeological Museum of Strasbourg. The identification numbers refer to their placement within the collection, the Corpus Inscriptionum Latinarum.

The following are typical inscriptions (CIL 13, 02858):

Au(gusto) sac(rum) d(eae) Sequan(ae) e[x] / moni[tu]

and (CIL 13, 02862):

Aug(usto) sac(rum) / d(e)ae Seq(uanae) / Fl(avius) Flav(i)n(us) / pro sal(ute) / Fl(avi) Luna(ris) / nep(otis) sui / ex voto / v(otum) s(olvit) l(ibens) m(erito)/ San(tos) Mi(chaelle)

Some inscriptions contain spelling errors that may give a clue to the pronunciation of Sequana in Gaulish (CIL 13, 02863):

Aug(usto) sac(rum) d<e=O>a(e?) / <p=B>ro(!) / Se<q=C>uan(ae) / pro(!) / C(aius) M[...] / v(otum) s(olvit) l(ibens) m(erito)

As Gaulish is in the P-Celtic classification, q cannot represent the Indo-European k^{w}. Something like Sek-ooana is more likely, unless the local dialect was Q-Celtic (which is not impossible).
