= Well of Moses =

Group of sculptures of c. 1400 by Claus Sluter

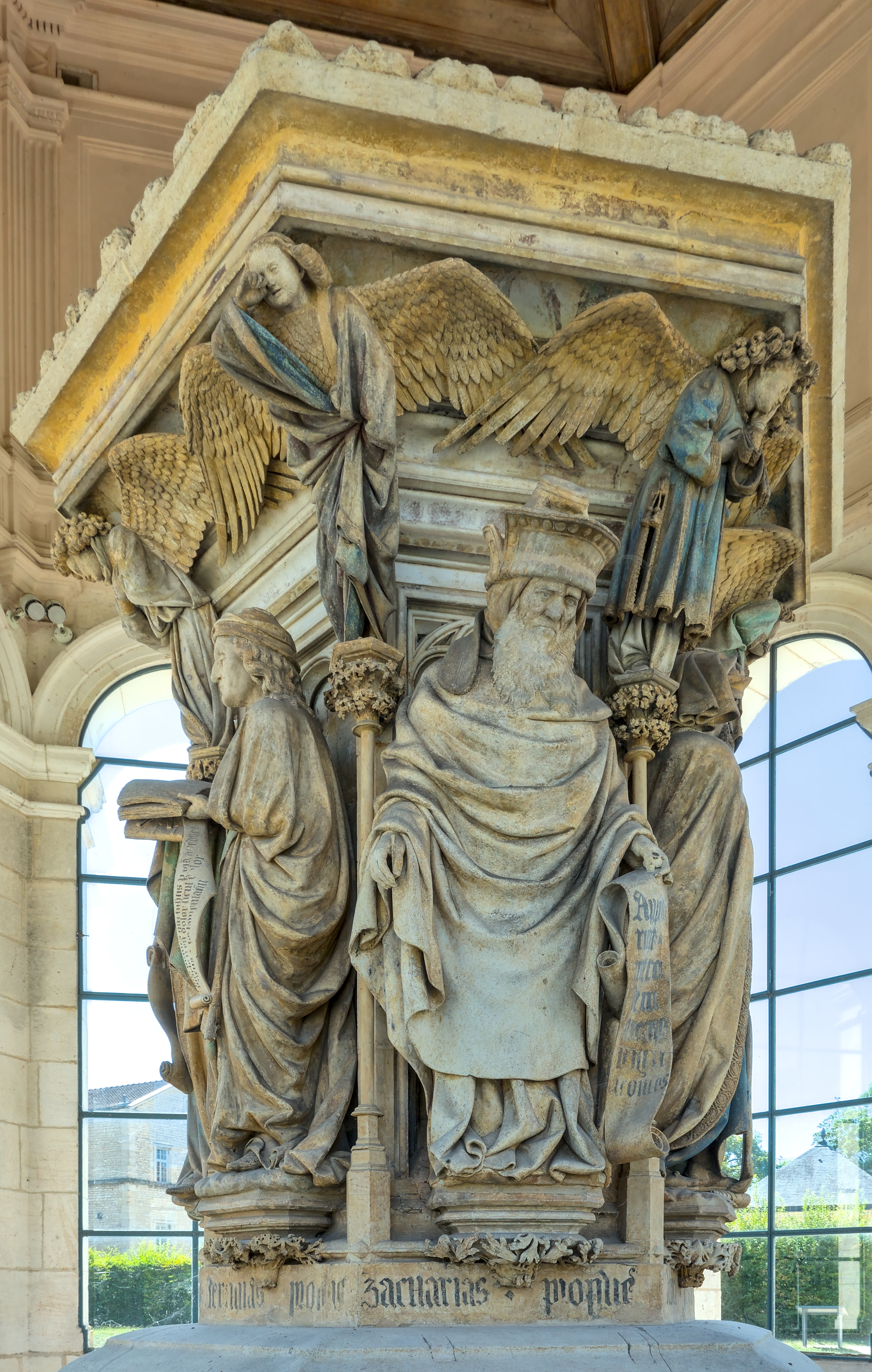
Zechariah and Jeremiah from the Well of Moses

The Well of Moses (French: Puits de Moïse) is a monumental sculpture recognised as the masterpiece of the Dutch artist Claus Sluter (1340–1405–06), assisted by his nephew Claus de Werve.

It was designed and built by Sluter and his workshop in 1395–1403 for the Carthusian monastery of Chartreuse de Champmol built as a burial site by the Burgundian Duke Philip the Bold just outside the Burgundian capital of Dijon, in today's France.

== Creation ==
The work was executed for Philip the Bold in a style combining the elegance of International Gothic with a northern realism, but with a monumental quality unusual in either. It was carved from stone quarried in Asnières, near Dijon, and consisted of a large crucifixion scene or "Calvary", with a tall slender cross surmounting a hexagonal base which was surrounded by the figures of the six prophets who had foreseen the death of Christ on the Cross (Moses, David, Jeremiah, Zechariah, Daniel and Isaiah). Standing on slender colonnettes on the corners between these prophets are six weeping angels. All the figures, including the lost Calvary group, were painted and gilded by Jean Malouel, and some of this paint remains. Thanks to the survival of the ducal accounts, the commission and ongoing work is unusually well documented. It was traditionally assumed that the Calvary scene would have included the Virgin Mary, Mary Magdalen, and St. John, though recent research (based on a close reading of the archives and an examination of the fixing-points on top of the base) suggests that there was only one figure, the Magdalen, embracing the foot of the Cross.

The work also contains a crypto-portrait of Philip the Bold as Jeremiah, the favoured prophet of the Carthusian order. When compared with the sculpture of Philip the Bold in the portal of the church, the two sculptures bear a striking resemblance to each other: prominent, rounded chin, large nose, deep set eyes with distinctive arched eyebrows. Also, Jeremiah is the only figure not depicted in blue or gold, he wears purple and green, the colours of Burgundy.

The structure originally consisted of four elements: the well itself around four meters deep and fed by water channelled from the nearby river Ouche, the hexagonal pier, sunk in the center of the well (adorned with the prophets and angels), a terrace measuring 2.8 meters across sitting atop the pillar, and the cross which rose from the center.

== Conservation ==
Situated in the central courtyard of what was then the main cloister, the building enclosing the well was added in the 17th century, when the upper parts of the work were already suffering from weather damage. The work was further damaged in 1791, during the French Revolution. The name "Well of Moses" (Puits de Moïse in French) appears during the 19th century.

Only fragments of the Crucifixion survive, including the head and torso of Christ; they are now housed in the Musée Archéologique in Dijon. The hexagonal base with its sculptures remains in what is now the Hospital de la Chartreuse, and can be seen by tourists.

== Images ==
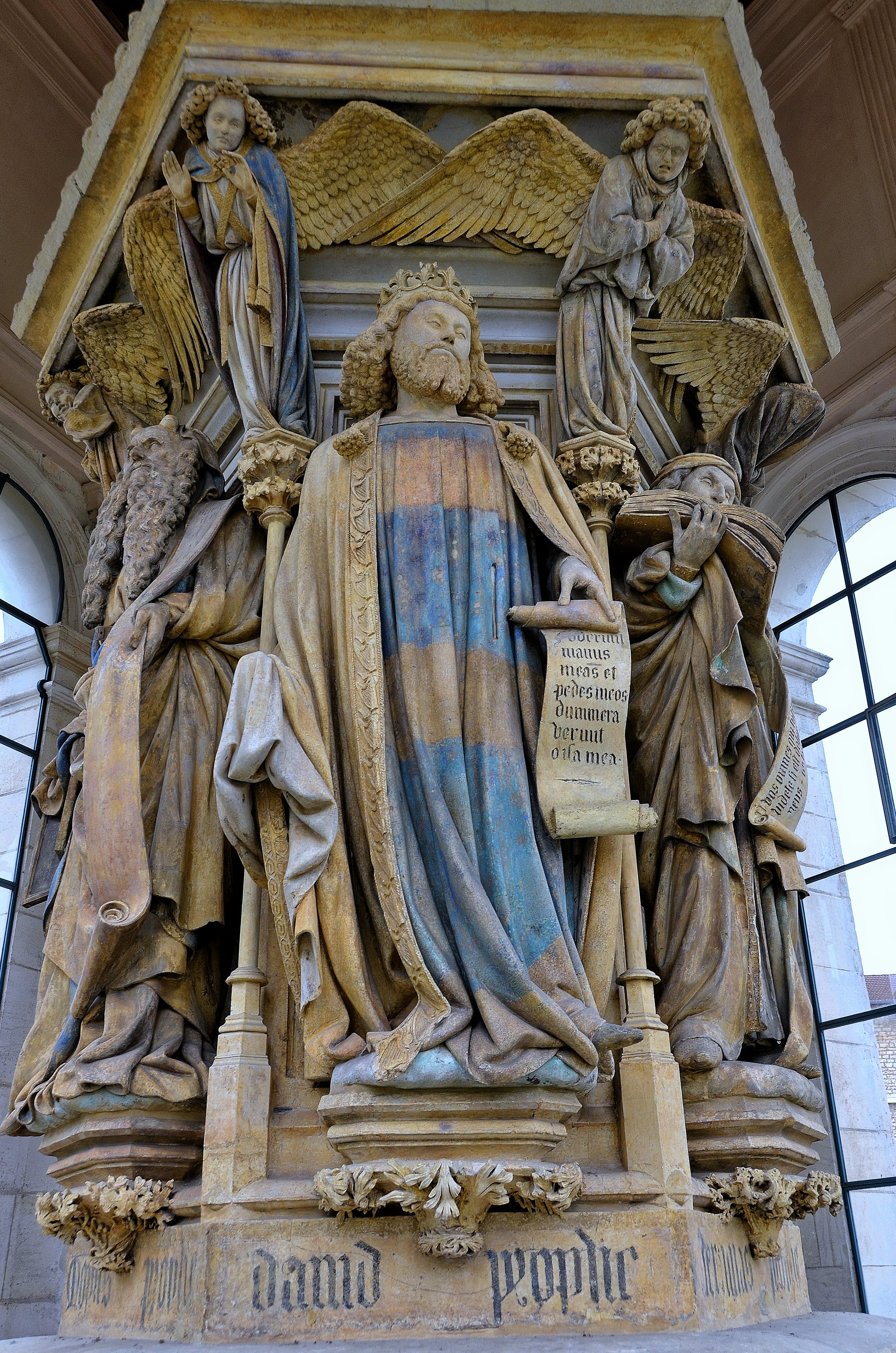
King David

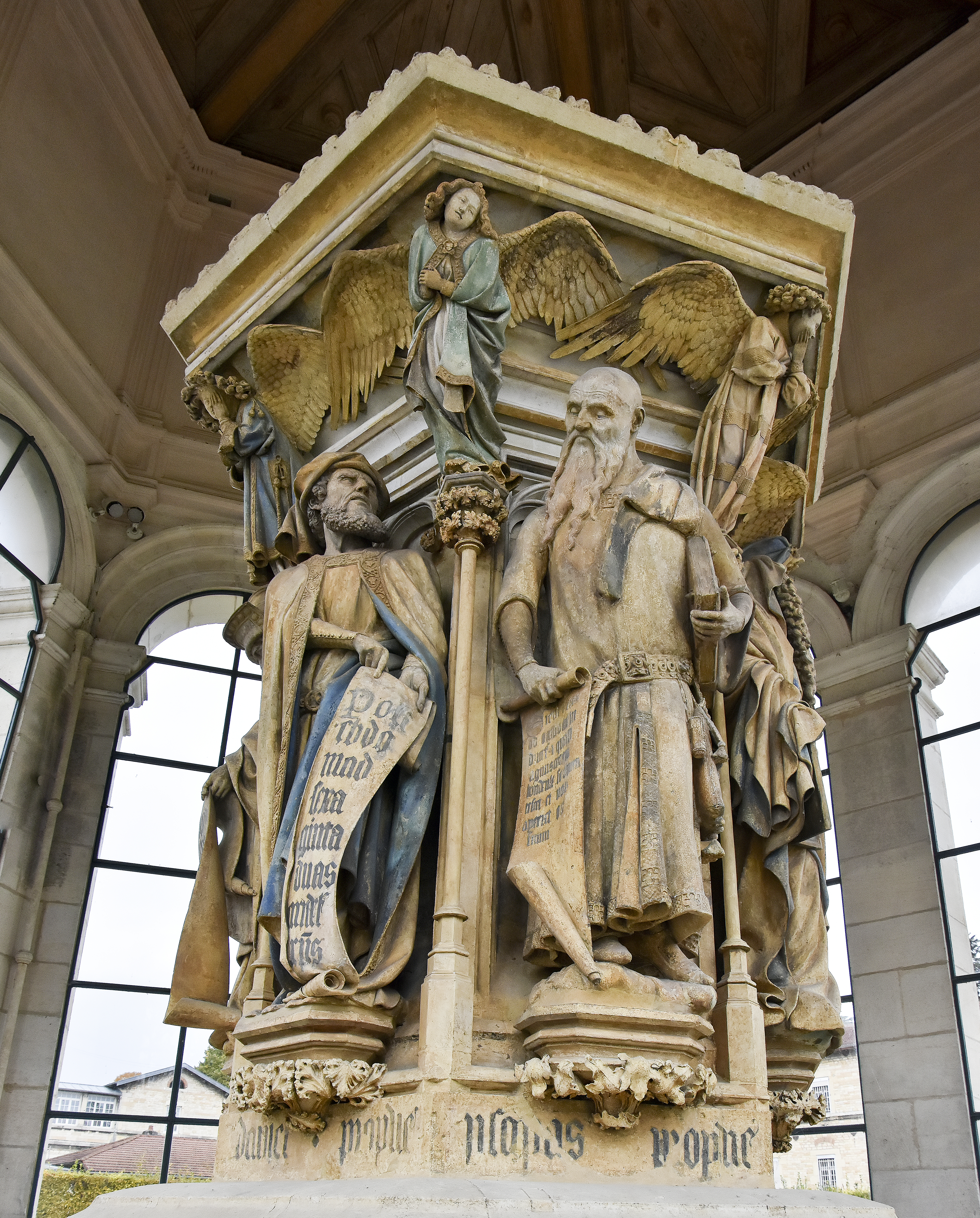
Daniel and Isaiah

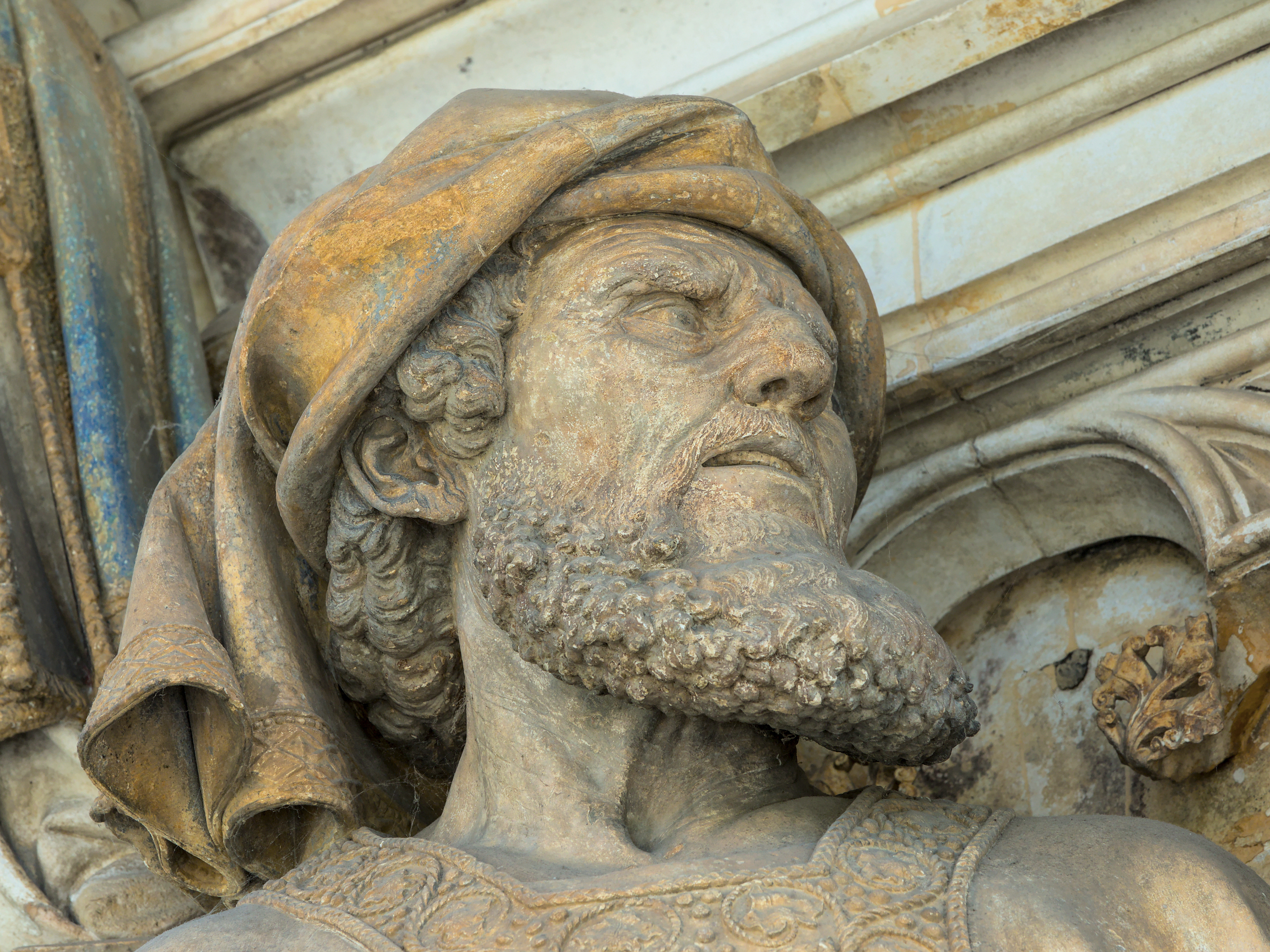
Detail of the head of Daniel

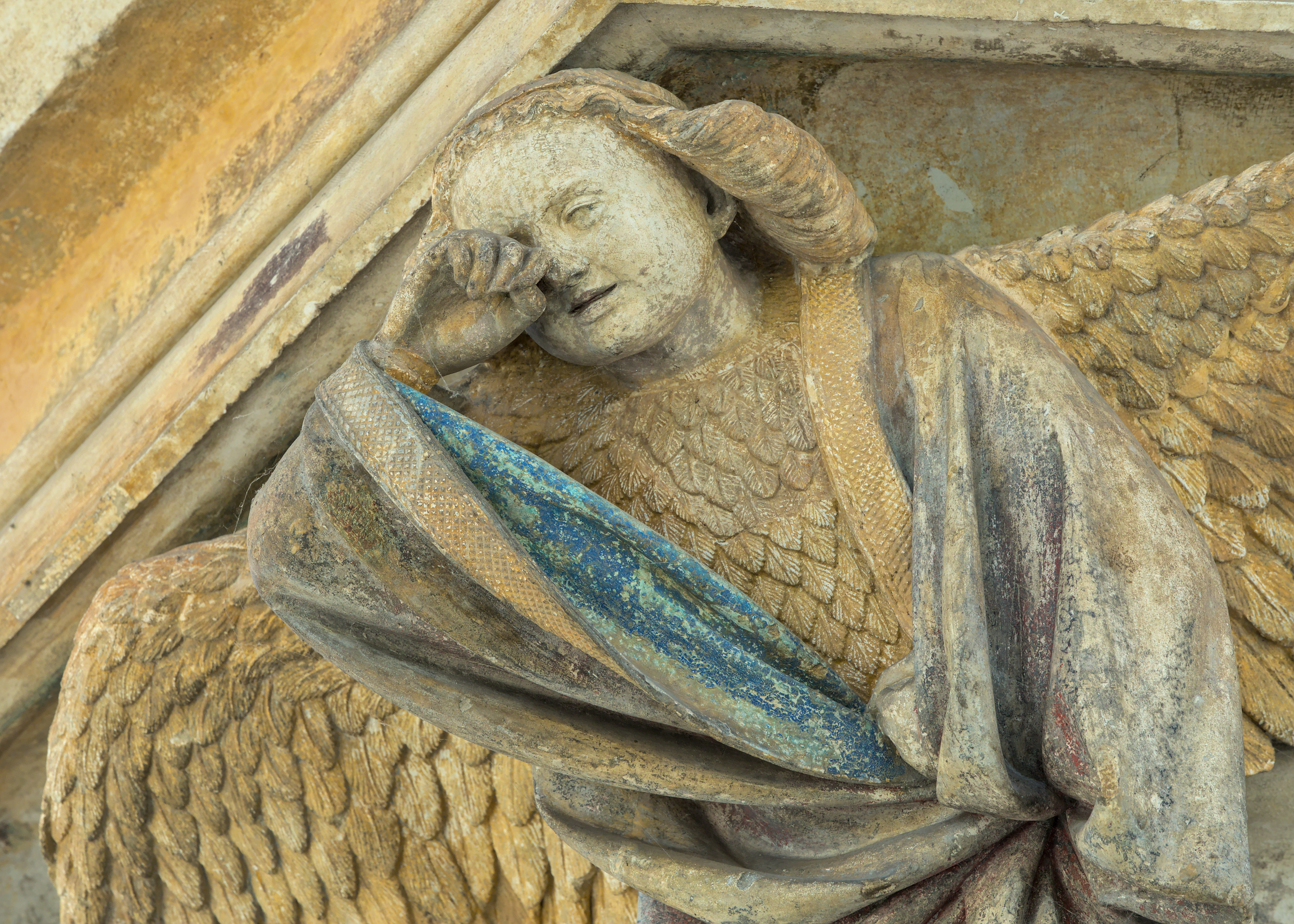
A mourning angel

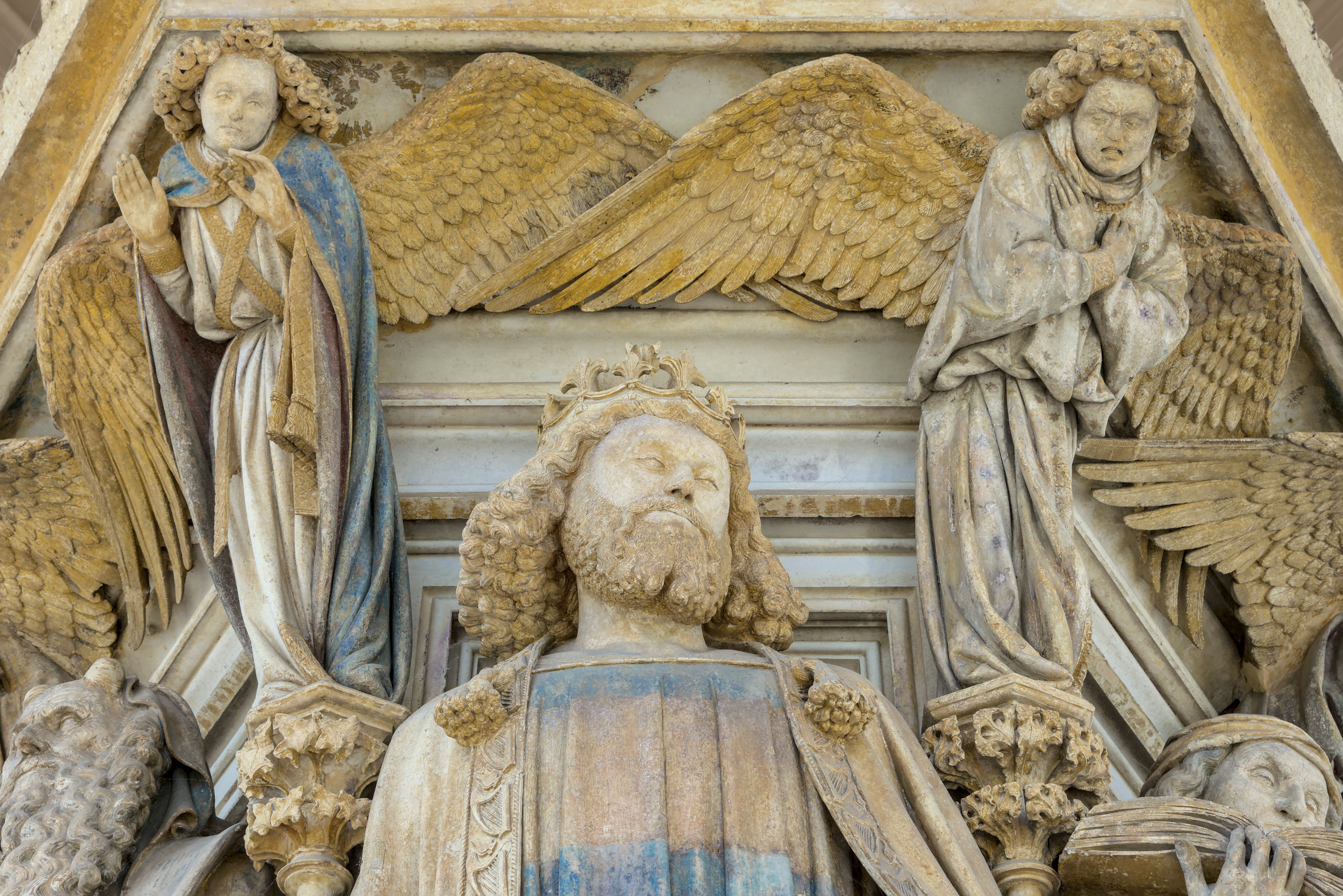
Detail of David's head and flanking angels

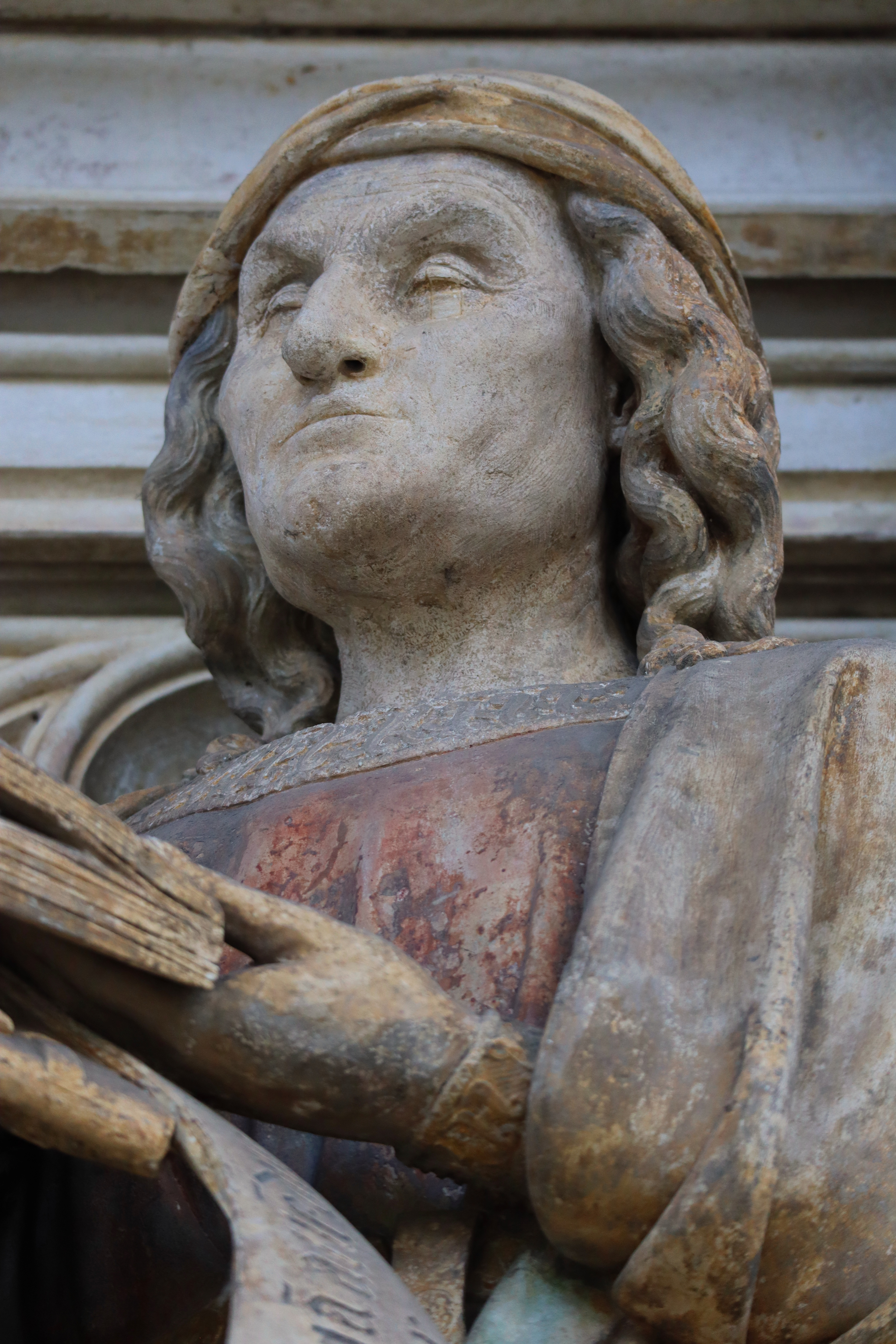
The head of Jeremiah, a presumed portrait of Philip the Bold

== See also ==
- Musée des Beaux-Arts de Dijon
- Well of Moses, Ben Ezra Synagogue, Fustat, Cairo, Egypt

== Sources ==
- Frish, Teresa Grace. Gothic Art 1140-c. 1450: Sources and Documents. University of Toronto Press, 1987. ISBN 0-8020-6679-8
- Nash, Susie. "The Lord’s Crucifix of Costly Workmanship: Colour, Collaboration and the Making of Meaning on the Well of Moses" in Circumlitio. The Polychromy of Antique and Late Medieval Sculpture, ed. V. Brinkmann, O. Primavesi and M. Hollein (Frankfurt am Main, 2010), pp. 356–381, full PDF Archived 6 October 2013 at the Wayback Machine
- Nash, Susie. "Claus Sluter's 'Well of Moses' for the Chartreuse de Champmol Reconsidered: Part I". The Burlington Magazine, Dec 2005. Volume=147, issue=1233
- Renate, Prochno. Die Kartause von Champmol. Grablege der burgundischen Herzöge 1364-1477. Berlin, Akademie Verlag, 2002. ISBN 978-3-0500-3595-6
