= San Michele Arcangelo, Verghereto =

Church building in Verghereto, Italy

San Michele Arcangelo is the parish church in the town of Verghereto, in the province of Forlì-Cesena, region of Emilia Romagna, Italy.

== History ==
A church of this name was originally attached to a rural Camaldolese monastery. When this collapsed, the church was moved to an equally ancient small Oratorio di Sant'Antonio, outside of the city walls. By 1865, a new church was commissioned and in 1884, construction began of the present church on Via Casentinese, inside the city center. The building was reconstructed after earthquakes in 1918–1919, the second World War nearly razed the structure. Again rebuilt using elements from prior structures, including a bell, dated 1404. It formerly contained an 18th-century canvas depicting Miracle by a Franciscan Saint now kept in the Museo diocesano di Arte Sacra in Sarsina.
