= Savio River Reserve =

Coordinates: 44°07′11″N 12°13′45″E

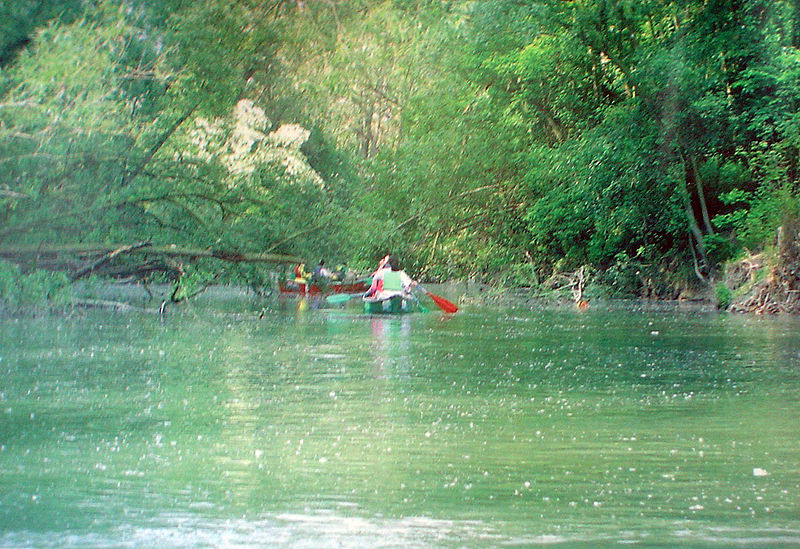
The Savio River Reserve in Cesena.

The Savio River Reserve extends along the River Savio in Italy. The river has preserved its natural course and its high-water bed is one of the few original landscapes left unchanged in the area around Cesena. The Reserve "merges" with urban area of Cesena, entering the town between the two historical bridges, the Ponte Vecchio (Old Bridge) and the Ponte Nuovo (New Bridge).

A depressed area is assigned to the creation of meadows for the nesting of herons and kingfishers. The meadows are accessible through walking paths or by canoe and guided tours are available.
