= Mount Castelvecchio =

Mountain in Italy

Coordinates: 43.8001°N 12.0502°E

Mount Castelvecchio is a mountain in Italy. It is located near Montecoronaro and is part of the Apennine Mountains. The source of the Savio River is on this mountain at an elevation of 1,126 m (3,694 ft).
