= Musée Archéologique de Dijon =

Archaeology museum

- Musée Archéologique de Dijon
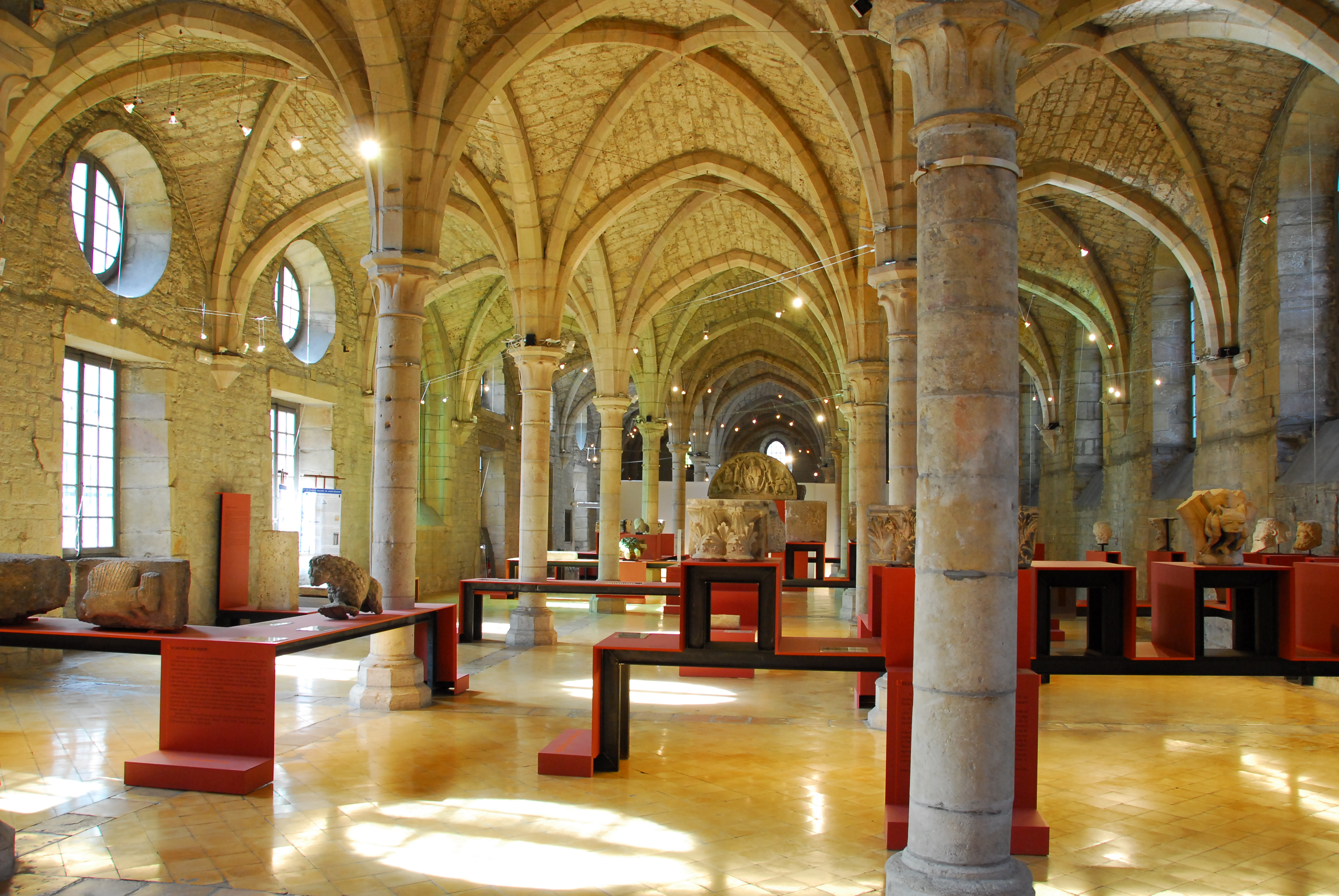
- Coordinates: 47°19′18″N 05°02′06″E
- Type: Archaeological
- Collections: Prehistoric, protohistoric, Gallic, Middle Ages, paleochristian art, church architecture, sacred art.
- Visitors: 2015: 35,609
- Curator: Sophie Casadebaig
- Website: archeologie.dijon.fr

The Musée Archéologique de Dijon is an archaeology museum focusing on the archaeology of Burgundy that was founded in 1832, in Côte-d'Or within Dijon, France. It contains collections regarding "the men of Burgandy" that covers the periods of prehistory, protohistory, the rule of Ancient Rome, and the Middle Ages as well as collections of paleochristian art, sacred art, and church architecture. The museum's collection and location have been housed since 1934, in the main wing of the Abbey of St. Bénigne, situated next door to the Dijon Cathedral.

== History ==
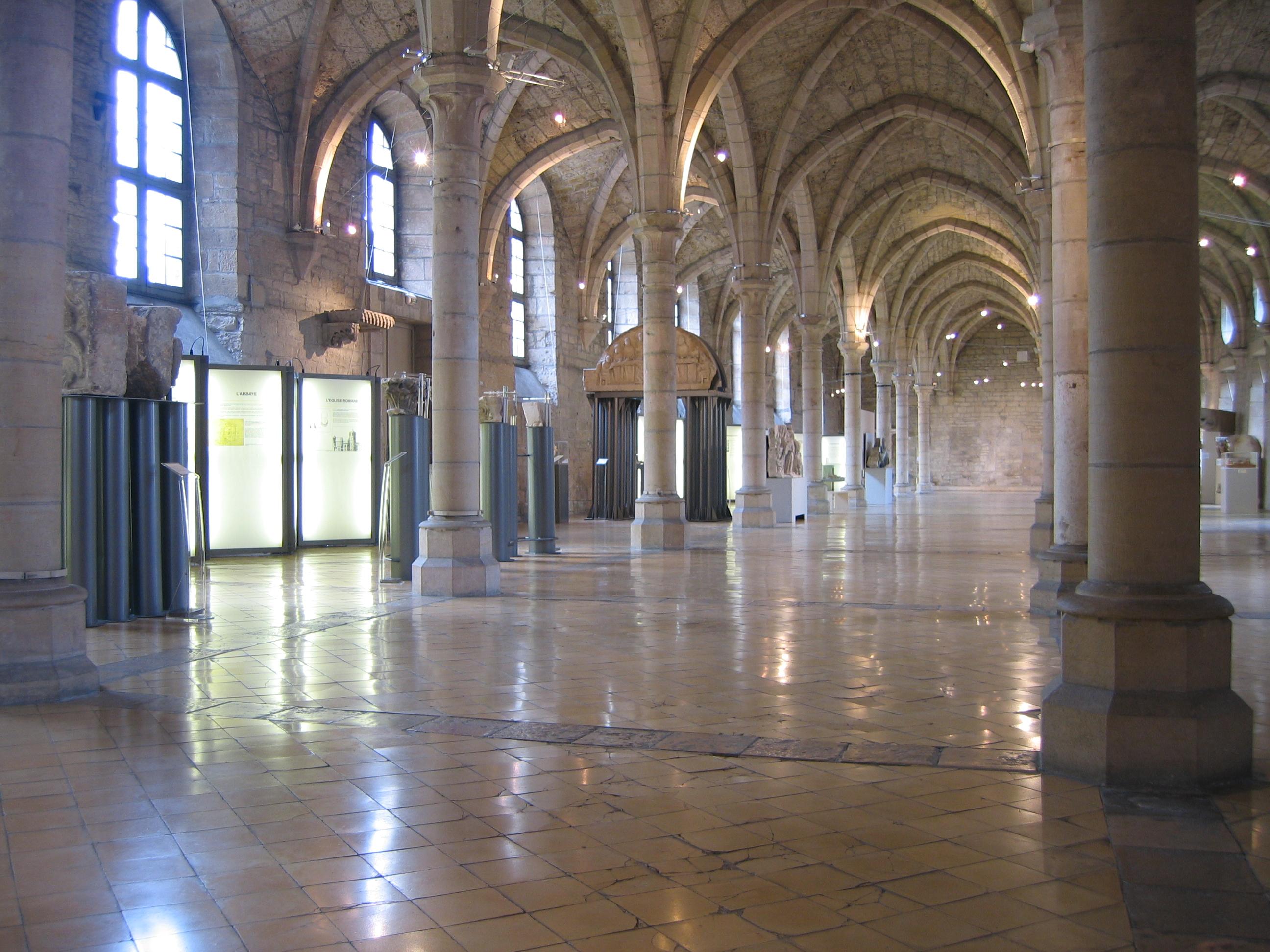
The Benedictine Dormitory (Gothic Style, 13th Century).

The museum first emerged as a collection created by a subdivision of the Academy of Dijon called the Commission des Antiquités du Département de la Côte-d'Or in 1832. The intended goal of the collection and organization was to preserve historical monuments and conduct archaeological operations at major sites such as the Gallo-Roman site at Alise-Sainte-Reine. The collection was initially displayed in the Rolin Hotel, a private mansion in Dijon. In 1934, the collection moved permanently to the Benedictine dormitory of the Abbey of St. Bénigne; the museum was municipalized in 1955, and began to occupy more levels of the building as the collection was expanded through local archaeological efforts.

== Collections ==
The museum houses collections from sites across Burgundy on its various floors.

=== Level 0 ===
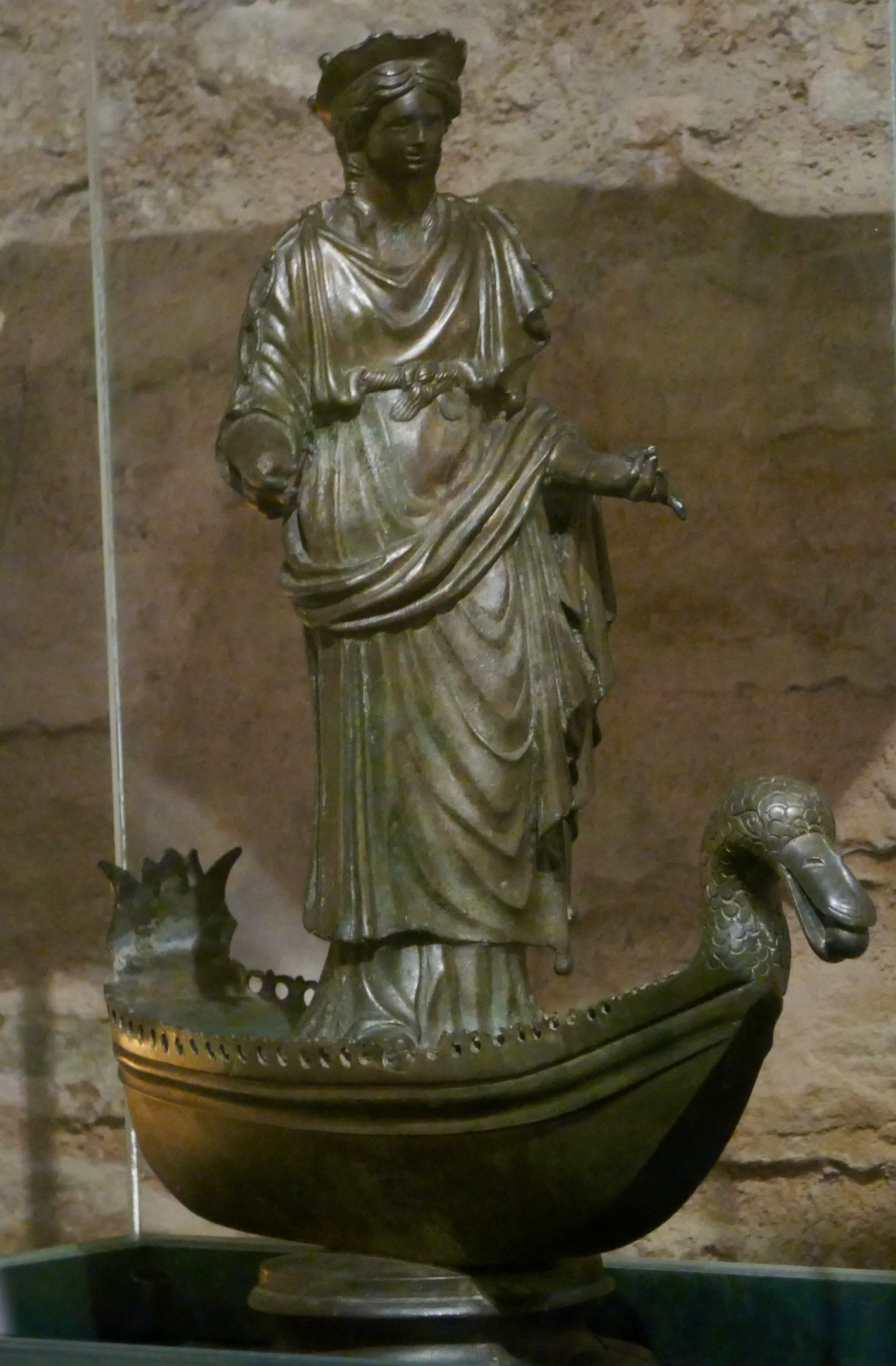
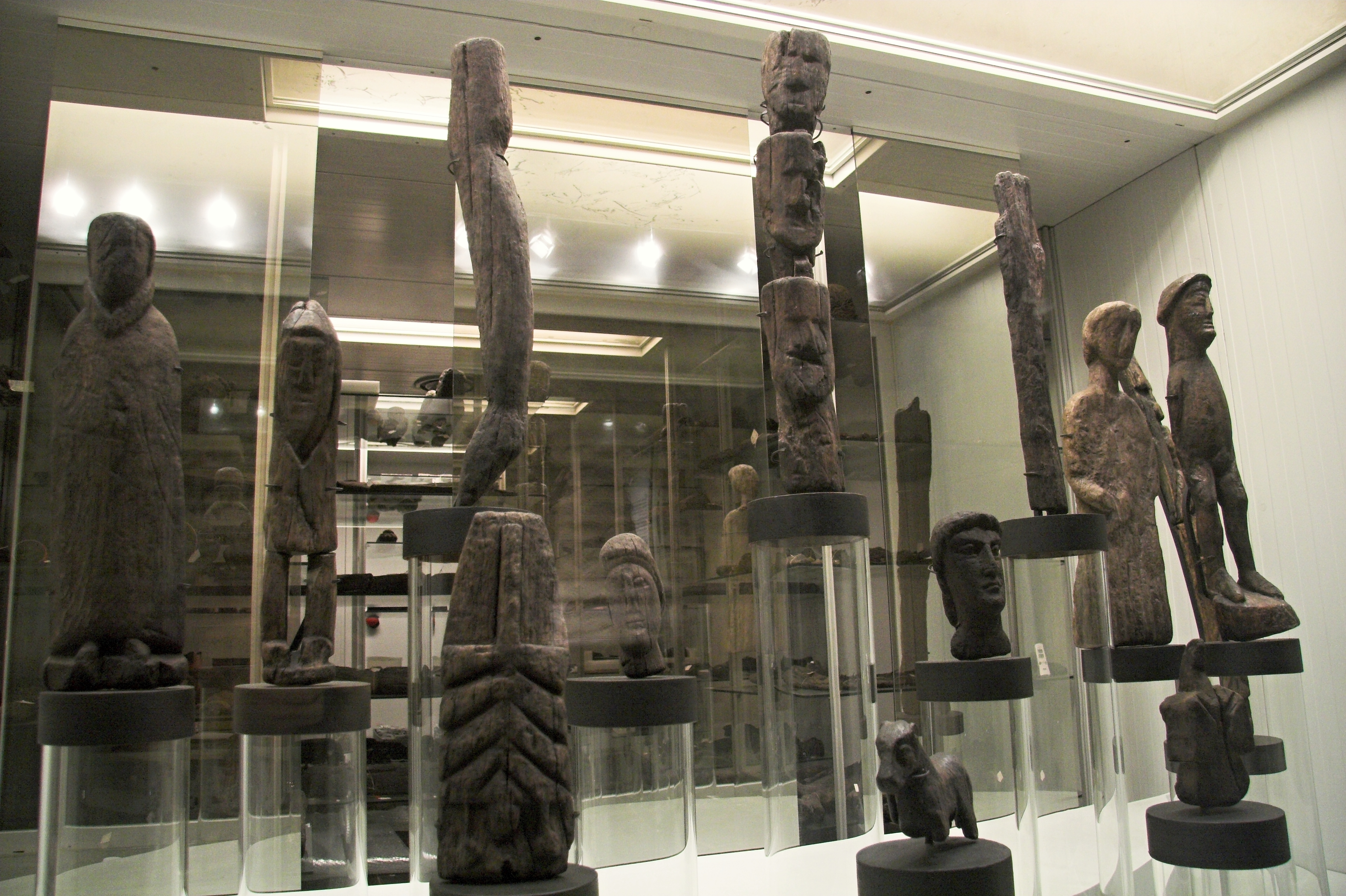
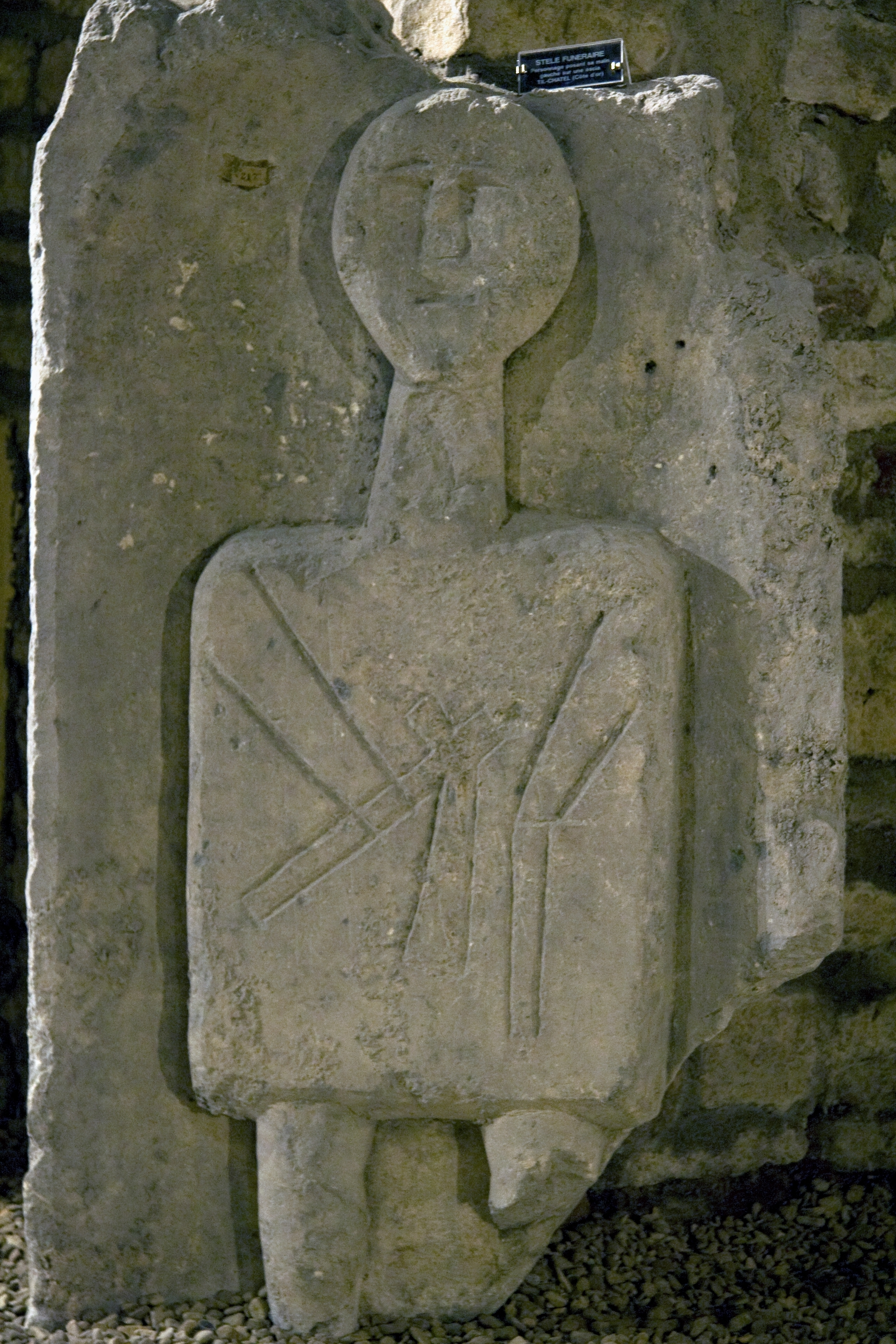
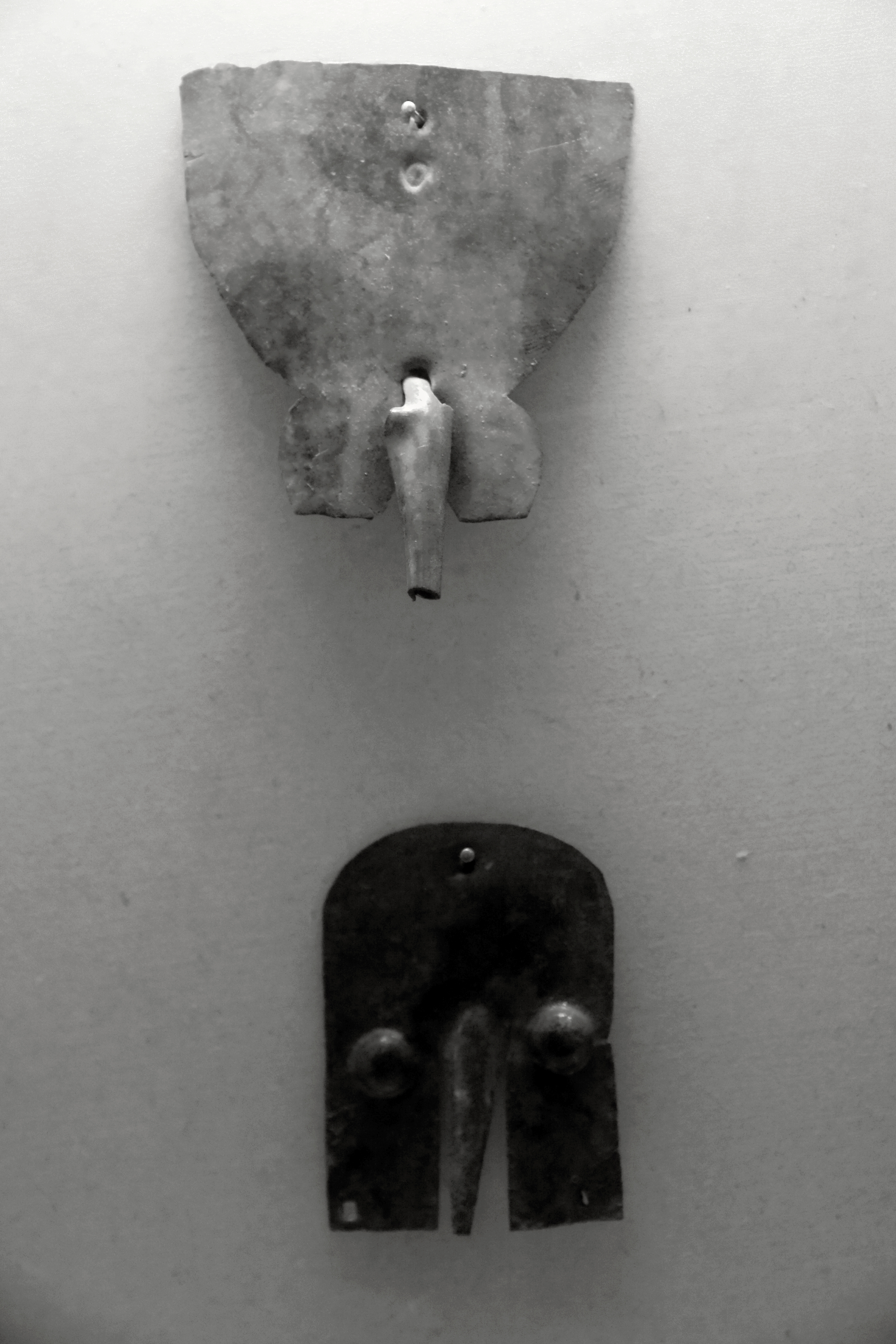
Level 0 permanent gallery. Clockwise from upper left: Statue of Sequana in a duck-shaped boat, an array of ex-votos in oak wood, a stylized bronze plating of male genitalia, a Gallic stele of a figure holding a candle.

The chapter house and scriptorium includes wood carved offerings to the goddess Sequana, a number of bas reliefs, and a sculpture of Sequana. Pilgrims from as far as the Mediterranean came to offer Sequana ex-votos at the source of the Seine River, with the temple to her being expanded by the Romans before its destruction in the fourth or fifth century AD. Included on this level is a drawn reconstruction of the numerous structures of the temple. The sculpture of Sequana and the ex-votos associated with her worship are considered a centerpiece of the museum, with curator Frédérique Bouvard remarking that the duckboat statue of Sequana is the museum's "Mona Lisa."

=== Level 1 ===
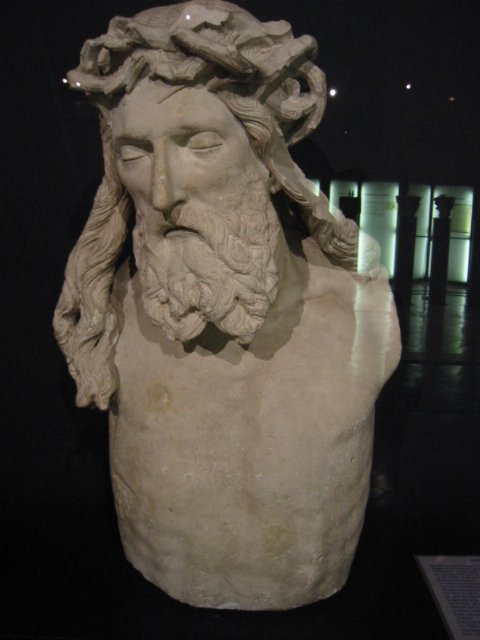
Claus Sluter, Christ Crowned with Thorns, (14th century).

The monks' dormitory exhibits Romanesque sculptures, including a bust of Jesus Christ wearing a crown of thorns sculpted by Claus Sluter. The bust is a fragment of a larger limestone crucifix that was erected in the courtyard of the Carthusian monastery of Champmol in Dijon as part of Sluter's Well of Moses. It was removed from the monument at an unknown time in the 18th century and later transported to the museum after being located in a wall in Dijon in the 19th century. The accompanying sculpture of Mary Magdalene has been lost.

=== Level 2 ===
Artifacts and art from the Paleolithic to Merovingian period are displayed:

- Paleolithic lithic flakes and cores
- Jewelry and weapons from the Merovingian period, including fibulae encrusted with garnets
- Artifacts from a site in Étaules
- Ceramics with pewter decoration from Chaume-lès-Baigneux
- Artifacts from the Abbey of St. Bénigne dating to the Middle Ages

== See also ==
- History of Burgundy
- Musée des Beaux-Arts de Dijon
- List of museums in France
- Lingons

== Sources ==
- Nash, Susie. "The Lord's Crucifix of Costly Workmanship: Colour, Collaboration and the Making of Meaning on the Well of Moses" in Circumlitio. The Polychromy of Antique and Late Medieval Sculpture, ed. V. Brinkmann, O. Primavesi and M. Hollein (Frankfurt am Main, 2010), pp. 356–381, full PDF
- Nash, Susie. "Claus Sluter's 'Well of Moses' for the Chartreuse de Champmol Reconsidered: Part I". The Burlington Magazine, Dec 2005. Volume=147, issue=1233
