= Lido di Classe =

- Frazione
- View of beach of Lido di Classe

- Location of Lido di Classe in Italy
- Coordinates: 44°19′31″N 12°20′06″E
- Country: Italy
- Region: Emilia-Romagna
- Province: Ravenna (RA)
- Comune: Ravenna

Area
  - Total: 652.89 km^{2} (252.08 sq mi)
- Time zone: UTC+1 (CET)
  - Summer (DST): UTC+2 (CEST)
- Postal code: 48100
- Dialing code: 0544

Lido di Classe is an Italian seaside resort on the Romagna Riviera and a frazione of the comune of Ravenna located north of Lido di Savio. It is bounded to the south by the mouth of the river Savio and to the north by the coastal area of Pineta di Classe and the nature reserve at the mouth of the river Bevano.

The name Lido di Classe derives from the town of Classe, near Ravenna, the site of an important Roman port.
