= Montecoronaro =

- Town
- Location within Italy
- Coordinates: 43°47′N 12°02′E
- Country: Italy

Montecoronaro is a town and tourist destination in Italy. It is a frazione of Verghereto. It is situated in a pass through the Apennine Mountains. The source of the Savio River is located nearby on Mount Castelvecchio. The wolf is the symbol of Montecoronaro.
