= Château de Frôlois =

Castle in Bourgogne-Franche-Comté, France

Coordinates: 47°31′40″N 4°37′54″E

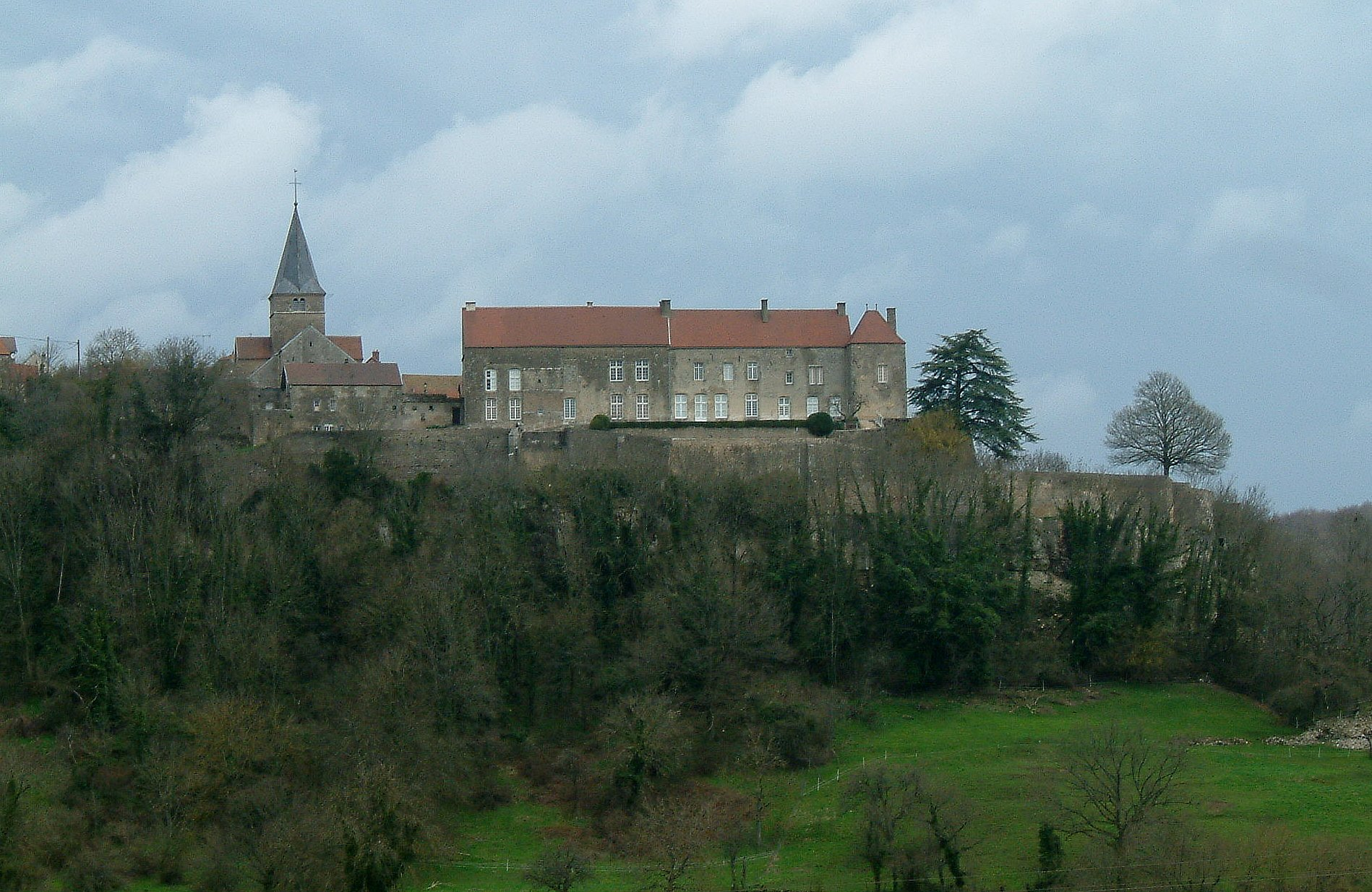
Frôlois castle and church

The Château de Frôlois is a castle converted into a château in the commune of Frôlois in the Côte-d'Or département of France.

The original castle was constructed in the 13th century; alterations were made in the 14th and 18th centuries.

It has been listed since 1977 as a monument historique by the French Ministry of Culture. Particularly noted by the Ministry are the façades and roofs, the so-called Antoine de Vergy room and its decoration, the supporting walls and the curtain wall.

The château is privately owned and has been in the same family for seven centuries. It is open to visitors between April and November.

== See also ==
- List of castles in France
