= Frôlois =

- Commune
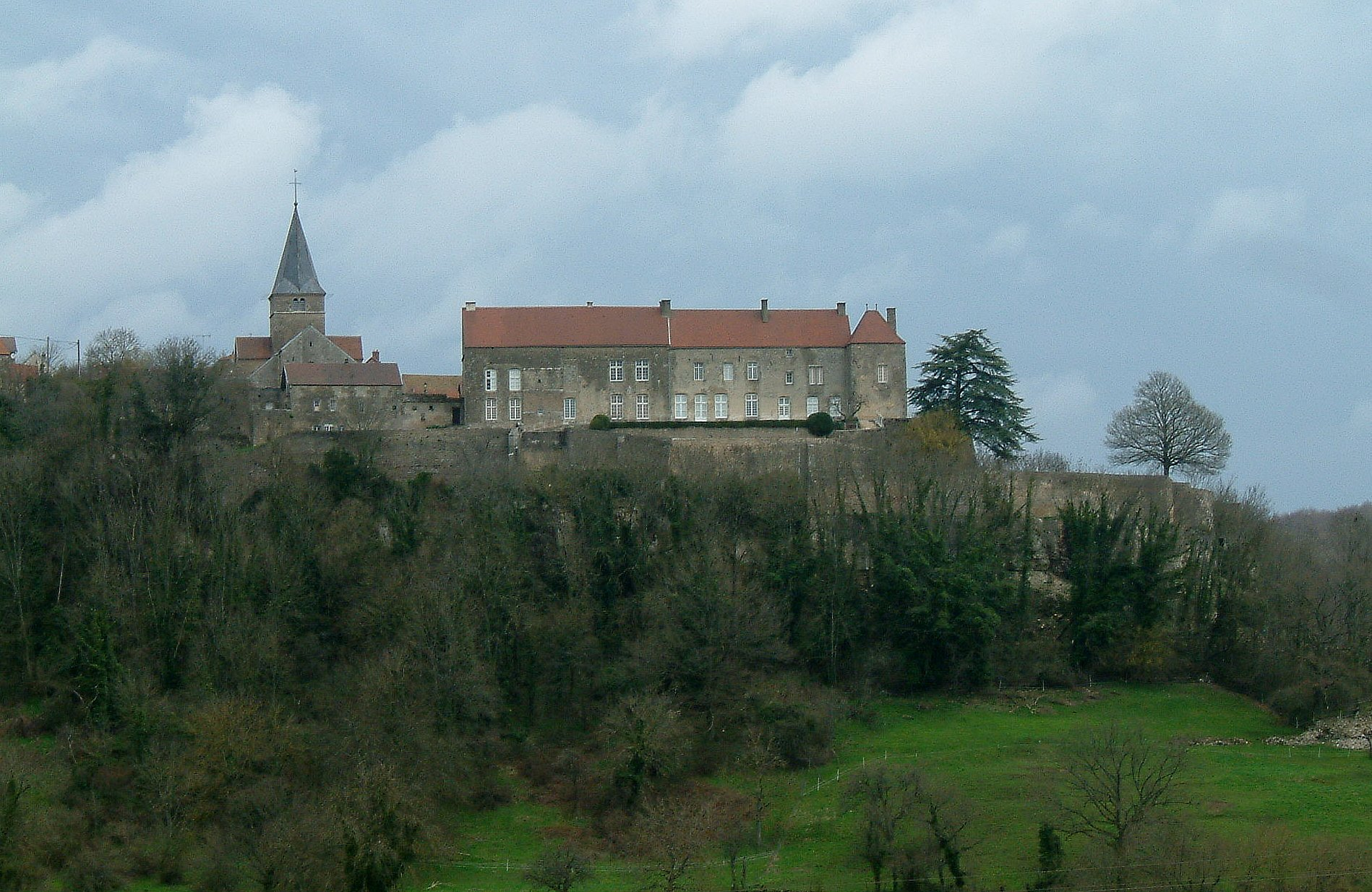
- The chateau and church in Frôlois
- Location of Frôlois
- Location within France Location within Bourgogne-Franche-Comté
- Coordinates: 47°31′50″N 4°37′55″E
- Country: France
- Region: Bourgogne-Franche-Comté
- Department: Côte-d'Or
- Arrondissement: Montbard
- Canton: Montbard

Government
  - Mayor (2020–2026): Damien Bigarnet
- Area^{1}: 34.77 km^{2} (13.42 sq mi)
- Elevation: 400 m (1,300 ft)
- Highest elevation: 482 m (1,581 ft)
- Lowest elevation: 299 m (981 ft)
- Population (2023): 166
  - Density: 4.77/km^{2} (12.4/sq mi)
- Time zone: UTC+01:00 (CET)
  - Summer (DST): UTC+02:00 (CEST)
- INSEE/Postal code: 21288 /21150
- ^{1} French Land Register data, which excludes lakes, ponds, glaciers > 1 km^{2} (0.386 sq mi or 247 acres) and river estuaries.

Frôlois (French pronunciation: [fʁolwa]) is a commune in the Côte-d'Or department in eastern France.

== Population ==
Historical population
Year	Pop.	±% p.a.
1968	303	—
1975	266	−1.84%
1982	248	−1.00%
1990	240	−0.41%
1999	190	−2.56%
2007	178	−0.81%
2012	174	−0.45%
2017	167	−0.82%
2023	166	−0.10%
Source: INSEE

== Sights ==
- Château de Frôlois: historic monument dating from 13th century.

== See also ==
- Communes of the Côte-d'Or department
