= Blessey =

- Part of Source-Seine
- Location of Blessey
- Location within France Location within Bourgogne-Franche-Comté
- Coordinates: 47°29′24″N 4°41′11″E
- Country: France
- Region: Bourgogne-Franche-Comté
- Department: Côte-d'Or
- Arrondissement: Montbard
- Canton: Montbard
- Commune: Source-Seine
- Area^{1}: 7.51 km^{2} (2.90 sq mi)
- Elevation: 500 m (1,600 ft)
- Highest elevation: 506 m (1,660 ft)
- Lowest elevation: 354 m (1,161 ft)
- Population (2006): 24
  - Density: 3.2/km^{2} (8.3/sq mi)
- Time zone: UTC+01:00 (CET)
  - Summer (DST): UTC+02:00 (CEST)
- Postal code: 21690
- ^{1} French Land Register data, which excludes lakes, ponds, glaciers > 1 km^{2} (0.386 sq mi or 247 acres) and river estuaries.

Blessey (French pronunciation: [blɛsɛ]) is a former commune in the Côte-d'Or department in eastern France. On 1 January 2009, Blessey was merged with Saint-Germain-Source-Seine to form the new commune of Source-Seine.

== Demographics ==
Historical population
Year	Pop.	±% p.a.
1962	25	—
1968	21	−2.86%
1975	20	−0.69%
1982	32	+6.94%
1990	30	−0.80%
1999	27	−1.16%
2006	24	−1.67%
Source: EHESS

== See also ==
- Communes of the Côte-d'Or department
