= Saint-Germain-Source-Seine =

- Part of Source-Seine
- Location of Saint-Germain-Source-Seine
- Location within France Location within Bourgogne-Franche-Comté
- Coordinates: 47°30′03″N 4°41′48″E
- Country: France
- Region: Bourgogne-Franche-Comté
- Department: Côte-d'Or
- Arrondissement: Montbard
- Canton: Montbard
- Commune: Source-Seine
- Area^{1}: 8.91 km^{2} (3.44 sq mi)
- Elevation: 500 m (1,600 ft)
- Highest elevation: 523 m (1,716 ft)
- Lowest elevation: 412 m (1,352 ft)
- Population (2006): 28
  - Density: 3.1/km^{2} (8.1/sq mi)
- Time zone: UTC+01:00 (CET)
  - Summer (DST): UTC+02:00 (CEST)
- Postal code: 21690
- ^{1} French Land Register data, which excludes lakes, ponds, glaciers > 1 km^{2} (0.386 sq mi or 247 acres) and river estuaries.

Saint-Germain-Source-Seine (French pronunciation: [sɛ̃ ʒɛʁmɛ̃ suʁs sɛn]) was a former commune in the Côte-d'Or department in eastern France. On 1 January 2009, Saint-Germain-Source-Seine was merged with Blessey to form the new commune of Source-Seine.

== Demographics ==
Historical population
Year	Pop.	±% p.a.
1962	56	—
1968	52	−1.23%
1975	41	−3.34%
1982	38	−1.08%
1990	35	−1.02%
1999	29	−2.07%
2006	28	−0.50%
Source: EHESS

== See also ==
- Communes of the Côte-d'Or department
