= Salmaise =

- Commune
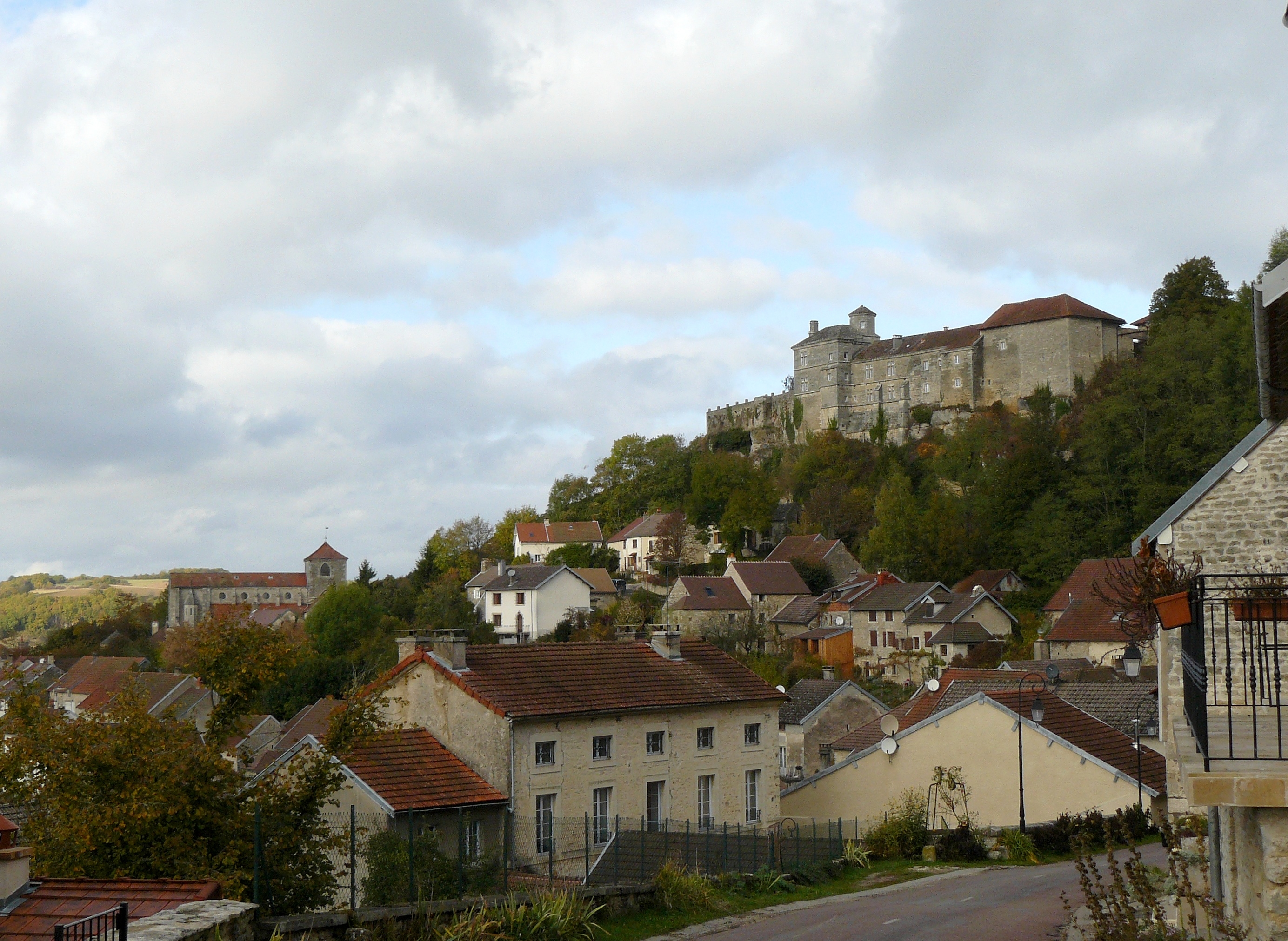
- A general view of Salmaise

- Coat of arms
- Location of Salmaise
- Location within France Location within Bourgogne-Franche-Comté
- Coordinates: 47°27′25″N 4°39′49″E
- Country: France
- Region: Bourgogne-Franche-Comté
- Department: Côte-d'Or
- Arrondissement: Montbard
- Canton: Montbard

Government
  - Mayor (2020–2026): Florence Delarue
- Area^{1}: 13.12 km^{2} (5.07 sq mi)
- Elevation: 323 m (1,060 ft)
- Highest elevation: 533 m (1,749 ft)
- Lowest elevation: 309 m (1,014 ft)
- Population (2023): 126
  - Density: 9.60/km^{2} (24.9/sq mi)
- Time zone: UTC+01:00 (CET)
  - Summer (DST): UTC+02:00 (CEST)
- INSEE/Postal code: 21580 /21690
- ^{1} French Land Register data, which excludes lakes, ponds, glaciers > 1 km^{2} (0.386 sq mi or 247 acres) and river estuaries.

Salmaise (French pronunciation: [salmɛz]) is a commune in the Côte-d'Or department in eastern France.

== Population ==
Historical population
Year	Pop.	±% p.a.
1968	169	—
1975	156	−1.14%
1982	161	+0.45%
1990	157	−0.31%
1999	136	−1.58%
2007	145	+0.80%
2012	136	−1.27%
2017	137	+0.15%
2023	126	−1.39%
Source: INSEE

== See also ==
- Communes of the Côte-d'Or department
