= Federigo Pedulli =

Italian painter

Federigo Pedulli (February 15, 1860 – after 1938) was an Italian painter, mainly of watercolor vedute of exterior and interior scenes.

He was born in Brisighella. He began his studies at the Academy of Fine Arts in Ravenna under Moradei, but then moved to study at the Academy of Fine Arts in Florence. Among a topic he often repeated was the interior of the Choir of the Church of Santa Maria Novella in Florence. He also repeatedly painted the courtyard of the Palazzo Vecchio, of the Bargello, and the stairwells of these palaces. Among other works, are an interior of Santa Croce; the cloister of the church of San Marco, the interior of the church of the Annunziata and Santa Maria Novella. Pedulli also has completed various portraits, landscapes, and decorative frescoes.
