= Domenico Barduzzi =

Italian dermatologist and hydrologist

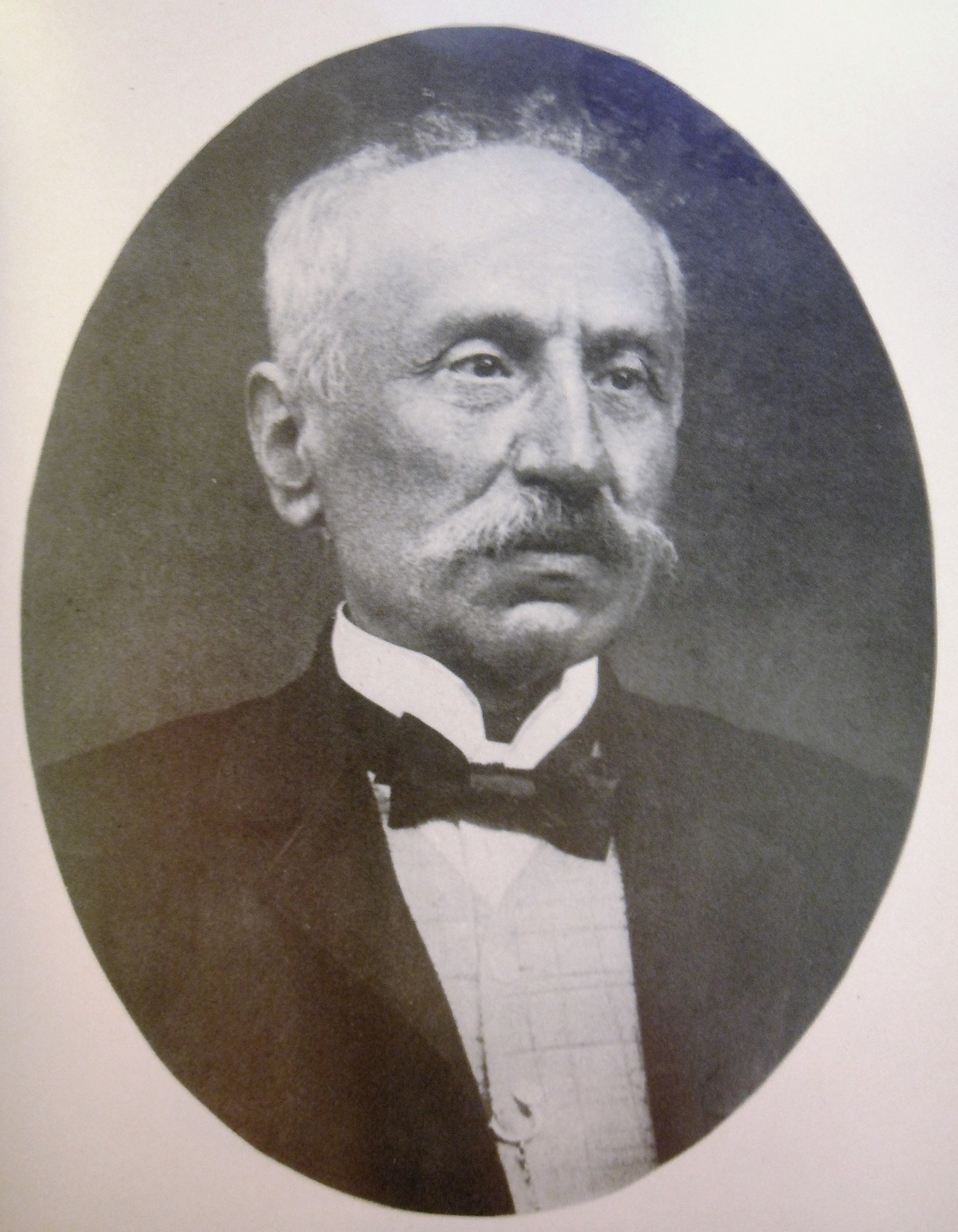
- Born: August 5, 1847; Brisighella
- Died: February 27, 1929 (aged 81); Siena
- Occupations: Dermatologist, hydrologist

Domenico Barduzzi (Brisighella, Aug. 5, 1847 - Siena, Feb. 27, 1929) was an Italian dermatologist, hydrologist and scholar of problems pertaining to syphilis and its treatment.

He is considered an innovator in the field of dermatology associated with venereology, especially in the study of dermosyphilopathy. He also distinguished himself in the fields of hydrology, social medicine, history of medicine and also as a politician at the university level.

He was one of the promoters of the establishment of an Italian society of dermatology and syphilography, of which he became secretary.

== Biography ==
Domenico Barduzzi was born in Brisighella on August 5, 1847, to Carlo Barduzzi, a land surveyor, and Angela Tani, a housewife. He undertook his early studies in his hometown, until 1863, when he took and passed the entrance examination at the Regio Liceo Torricelli in Faenza, and then completed the 1867–1868 school year at the Liceo Dante in Florence.

He obtained a degree in Medicine in 1872 in Pisa, to which he added the Diploma of Free Practice obtained in 1874 in Florence and in 1882 the University Teaching Licence in Dermatology at the University of Modena thanks to his studies in dermatology under Augusto Michelacci. In 1883 he obtained the position of extraordinary professor of Dermosyphilopathy in the University of Pisa and in the following year participated in the competition for the same chair and ranked third, while the winner was Celso Pellizzari, who was already an extraordinary professor in Siena. After Pellizzari's transfer, Barduzzi was initially offered the vacancy in Siena, which he declined, and in 1886 he passed the competition for the chair of clinical dermosyphilopathy at the University of Siena in which he became dean of the Faculty of Medicine in 1901. Rector in alternate years between 1898 and 1912, he retained the professorship until 1922. He received, among others, high honors such as the appointment as Knight of the Order of the Crown of Italy in 1891 and the appointment as Grand Officer of the Crown of Italy in 1922, and devoted himself to the study of hydrology, contributing to specialist journals and magazines and taking on numerous offices and positions, including directing the San Giuliano Baths in 1885, and to research in the history of medicine, especially focusing on figures in Italian medicine such as Gentile da Foligno and Fabrici d'Acquapendente, both in 1919.

=== Barduzzi and the university ===
After winning the competition for a professorship in the University of Siena, unable to reconcile family life with his work as a freelancer in Pisa, he moved to Siena only in 1890, when he was appointed full professor. However, this did not prevent him from finding a favorable environment in Siena, quickly integrating himself into the university and city environment. In fact, in 1887 he became an ordinary member of the Accademia dei Fisiocritici, until being elected its president from 1893 to 1896 and also from 1908 until his death. In 1892 he was elected councilor of the City of Siena, a position he held until 1908.

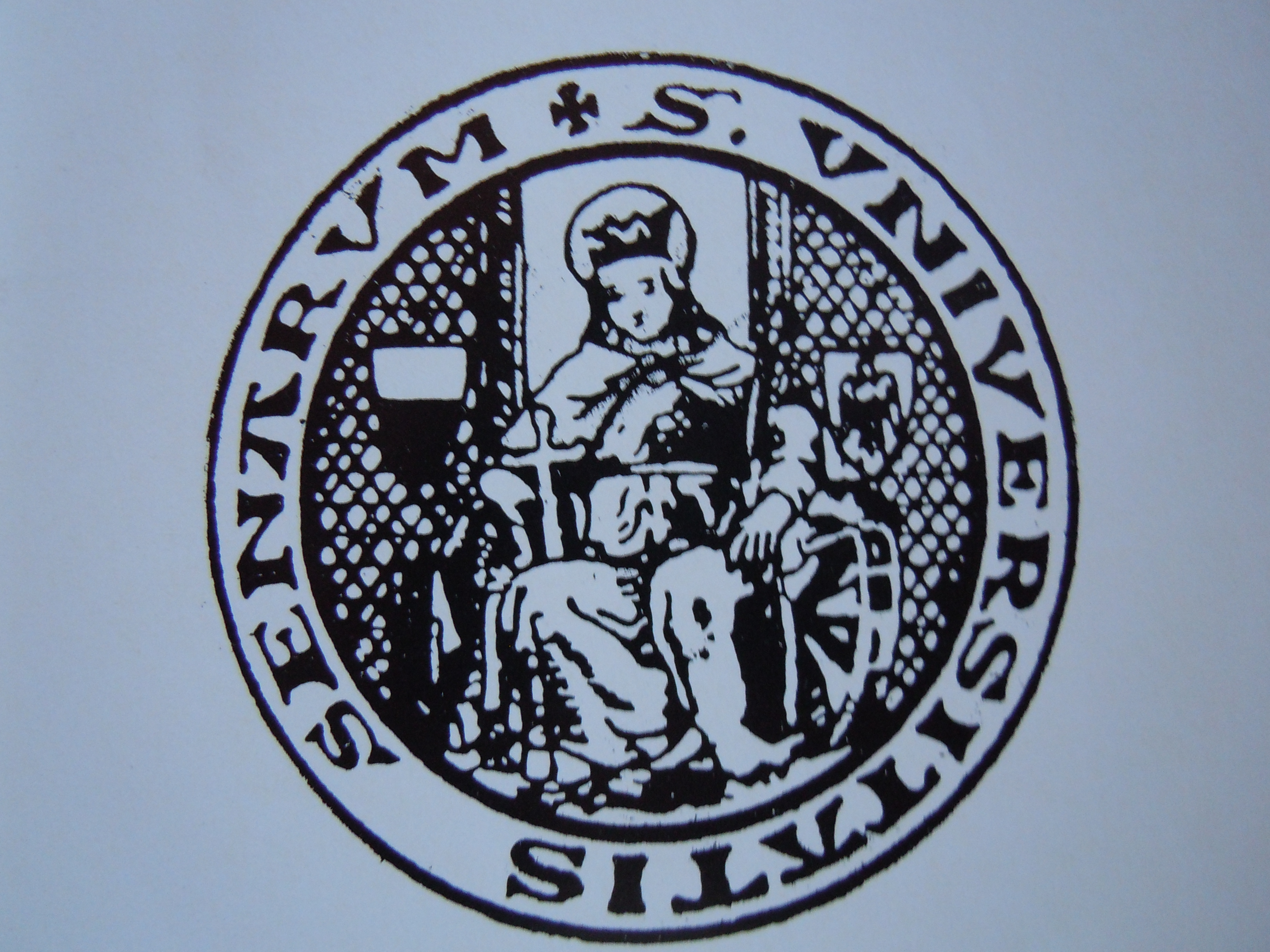
Historic seal of the University of Siena in the version approved by the Consulta Araldica (1896)

In addition to being a professor, he also distinguished himself as an administrator and defender of the University of Siena in the post-unification period, which was marked by a climate of great uncertainty for higher education and the University, speaking of parliamentary provisions such as:

the confusing and uncertain regulatory rules in place, the contradictory provisions, and the varying interpretations.

— Domenico Barduzzi

Along these lines, in 1894 he founded the University Union, which he directed for five years, a journal to which professors from all over the peninsula contributed, including Cesare Lombroso, Enrico Morselli and Vittorio Emanuele Orlando, in which he proposed:

to provide the means for those in university life to expound their ideas and discuss [...] all opinions which, while remaining among themselves different, are inspired by the loyal conviction that they bring benefit to studies and to the dignity of those who profess them.

— Domenico Barduzzi

The journal expanded rapidly until it gave birth in 1902 to a nationwide magazine, L'Università italiana, published in Bologna and edited by Barduzzi himself and Raffaele Guerrieri. Among his other achievements as chancellor of the University of Siena, he coined the university's current historical seal, which was approved by the Consulta Araldica on January 4, 1896.

=== Barduzzi and dermato-venereology ===
Barduzzi officially entered the field of dermatology in 1883 with his appointment as lecturer having already shown his talent for the subject a few years earlier in the two-year period of advanced studies and practice in the discipline in order to obtain the university teaching licence. This degree allowed him to practice under Augusto Michelacci, professor of dermatology, and Pietro Pellizzari, as professor of venereology.

Barduzzi's early studies focused mainly on syphilis and especially on the problems of its treatment. These studies were also influenced by the scientific activity of Pietro Pellizzari, who had conducted experiments on three voluntary subjects (at that time it was not forbidden in Tuscany to subject, especially condemned prisoners, to experiments of a scientific nature) in order to test whether syphilis could be transmitted by blood. Barduzzi, despite the initial fascination with this theory, which he approached with enthusiasm, understood that the most effective way to stop the spread of syphilis was mainly prophylaxis care and the need to address the problem from a social point of view, since there was no valid therapy at the time. Furthermore, Barduzzi became convinced that in order to defend the population from the rampant contagion of syphilis, dermatovenereologists would have to unite in an association, which was founded in 1885 in Perugia: Barduzzi joined the steering committee as secretary, after being one of the promoters of the statute.

He was the promoter in Italy of the use of salvarsan, the arsenical preparation patented by Paul Ehrlich for the treatment of syphilis, sensing the importance of creating a precise protocol for testing the drug and anticipating current pluricentric trials. Prominent among his pupils were Vittorio Mibelli and Pio Colombini; the former achieved great fame even beyond national borders thanks to his description of two new skin diseases, namely Mibelli's angiokeratoma and porokeratosis, while the latter became a professor in Sassari and Modena but failed to continue the master's work.

=== Barduzzi and hydrology ===
In his early thirties, in 1881, Barduzzi began his experience as a hydrologist with the direction of the Castrocaro Thermal Baths in the province of Forlì, and then in 1885 he temporarily obtained the vacant post of medical director of the San Giuliano Thermal Baths in the province of Pisa, a post he then obtained definitively the following year and which he never left again until the end of his career. In the same year he co-founded and promoted the Italian Medical Association of Hydrology and Climatology along with Scipione Vinaj, Pietro Grocco, Luigi Pagliani, and Luigi Burgonzio. He quickly became one of the leading figures in Italian hydrology and climatology between the 19th and 20th centuries, so much so that he was appointed, among the many offices and positions he held, delegate of the Italian Association of Hydrology and Climatology to the International Congress in Brussels in 1897, president of the Ninth National Congress of Hydrology and Climatology in San Remo in 1908 and in 1910 of the Tenth National Congress of Hydrology, Climatology and Physical Therapy in Salò during which he drew the attention of the audience of scholars to the spread of artificially mineralized waters. His hydrological research unhinges the empiricism of the old and obsolete therapy according to which the beneficial properties of mineral water were directly proportional to the high presence of total dissolved solids and demonstrates how their chemical composition is instead fundamental, considering their acidic, basic elements and all those phenomena that have little or nothing to do with overall mineralization. Barduzzi verified how at the basis of the beneficial properties of the waters of the San Giuliano Baths is the presence of considerable radioactivity, which had already been found by the Italian physicist Angelo Battelli and also confirmed in 1908 by Marie Curie. Beneficial properties found especially in cases of eczema, psoriasis, neurodermatitis, in some varieties of acne and prurigo nodularis and especially in varicose ulcers.

Barduzzi vigorously advocated in all his speeches the priority of renewing hydrological studies by combating balneotherapeutic empiricism and the rigorous chemical-physical and clinical study of water sources; he also considered it necessary to supervise with specific regulations the reservoirs with the imposition of frequent chemical and bacteriological analyses. In fact, according to Barduzzi himself, the legislative model to follow is the French one, which had long since regulated the water resources system with specific laws and regulations. He was concerned with crenotherapeutic treatment of skin diseases, but did not neglect other methods of treatment related to crenotherapy such as hydrotherapy, physiotherapy, phototherapy and electrotherapy. He also considered it essential to take care of the water supply, and in particular he dealt with the case of Siena, in which the water system could provide 38 liters of water per person per day, very little compared to the minimum then set at 150 liters per person, believing it essential to follow the idea of Rudolf Virchow, who considered a consistent water supply fundamental to the economic development of a city.

=== Barduzzi and the history of medicine ===
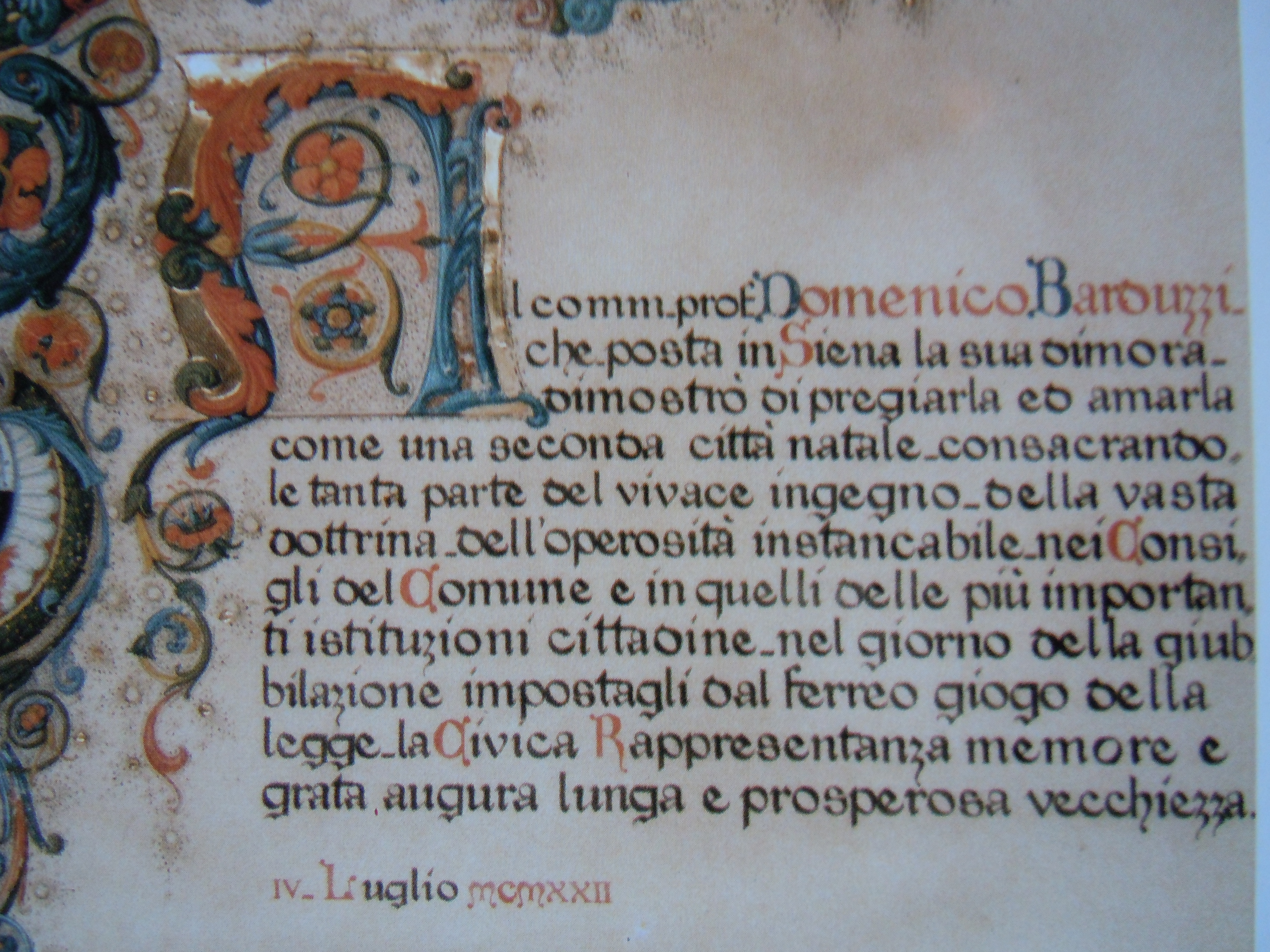
Scroll awarded to Prof. Domenico Barduzzi by the City of Siena for his retirement. (1922)

There are basically three crucial moments in Barduzzi's life as a historian of medicine: the establishment of the Italian Society of the History of Medicine in 1907 (he became its first president), the founding of the Journal of Critical History of Medical and Natural Sciences as the official organ of the society itself, and the establishment of the Chair of the History of Medicine in Siena in 1922. He is the author of numerous publications on personalities in the history of Italian and European medicine, among whom are Andreas Vesalius, Galileo Galilei, Leonardo da Vinci, Evangelista Torricelli, Vincenzo Chiarugi, Francesco Puccinotti and many others; he also devoted himself with passion to the collection of news about the University of Siena, an effort that took him about twelve years to complete because of the great difficulties he encountered in finding the necessary documents. His most important publications in this regard are: Cenni storici sull'Università di Siena (1900), Documenti per la storia dell'Università di Siena (1900), Di alcune vicende storiche moderne dello studio senese (1902), Cenni storici sull'origine dell'Università di Siena (1910), Brevi notizie sulla R. Università di Siena (1912).

Through these and a variety of other works he would become the forerunner in Italy for a methodical, precise and rational study of the history of medicine, which would abandon anecdotes and rhetoric to become a real science and thus of fundamental importance in academic study. In fact, he argued how indispensable it is for all physicians to have a clear knowledge of the history of medical scientific doctrines, as it is essential for understanding the objective value of any new scientific discovery, and, again in this regard, he stated in an 1899 paper:

History is not only the instrument for measuring the extent of the progress of medicine, but it is also the source for knowing the continuity and evolution of medical scientific thought in the midst of so many, so diverse and protracted secular struggles [...]. Studying the past does not mean knowing only the ancient doctrines, or parading so many names, dates, but it means understanding the gradual evolution of the human spirit in the progress of biology, anthropology, and the history of medicine.

— Domenico Barduzzi

Also in the academic year 1912–1913, at the initiative of the Faculty of Medicine of Siena and with the approval of the Higher Council of Education, he began his teaching of the history of medicine at the University of Siena, then called a free course in Critical History of Medical Sciences. The course was initially classified as a 3rd category, that is, as a supplementary course to be taught free of charge, and was confirmed from year to year until 1922, when Barduzzi was forced to leave teaching due to age limits. He is also the author of two Handbooks of the History of Medicine: the first in 1923, from the origins to the entire 17th century, and the second in 1927, from the 18th century to the present.

=== Barduzzi and social medicine ===
Barduzzi's activity as a thermal therapist, in addition to being the starting point for his career as a hydrologist, also became the moment in which he approached medicine from a social point of view, devoting himself in particular to the care of prophylaxis, already considered of great importance in the prevention of syphilis, and hygiene, practices that he would also consider fundamental in the fight against tuberculosis. Indeed, it was he as president of the Accademia dei Fisiocritici who was the first in Italy to set up a standing committee for the fight against tuberculosis in November 1898, and about the importance of hygiene education, he says:

In this regard, courses in school hygiene should be made compulsory in secondary schools, with special regard to the transmission of infectious diseases in general and tuberculosis in particular. Physicians, in turn, should never forget their duty to make the curable patients aware of the nature of their disease, so that they may be persuaded by the strictest prophylactic rules.

— Domenico Barduzzi

He is also one of the first to identify and analyze the social causes and pathological effects of alcoholism, a scourge of the working class in the early 20th century, even though alcohol was then considered by many even necessary for the nutrition of a man engaged in heavy labor. In this regard he states:

Therefore, it does not seem laudable to us to make the worker understand, that to produce the amount of labor necessary for his existence, the use of alcohol is indispensable. This is a bad teaching, which must indeed be combated.

— Domenico Barduzzi

Concerning the bill on the care of abandoned children he denounced, in 1908 at the Dermatological Congress and Physiocritics, the degradation, neglect and the very inability of the relevant institutions to handle the situation itself. The total lack of hygienic and prophylactic standards, the absence of sanitary management, and the carelessness in enforcing the most elementary laws and provisions are the bleak picture that Barduzzi describes on the basis of the data of the Commission of Inquiry. He also raised against the prejudice about syphilis, understanding that the mystery about it prevented the provision of certain data and thus the best way to combat it, and proposed more preventive controls on the health of the wet nurses and the drawing up of precise statistical reports regarding children. Despite the pressure exerted, all the issues raised by the Brisighella doctor are absolutely neglected in the bill, proving to be a text drafted by bureaucrats without any specific medical expertise.

== Memories and monuments ==
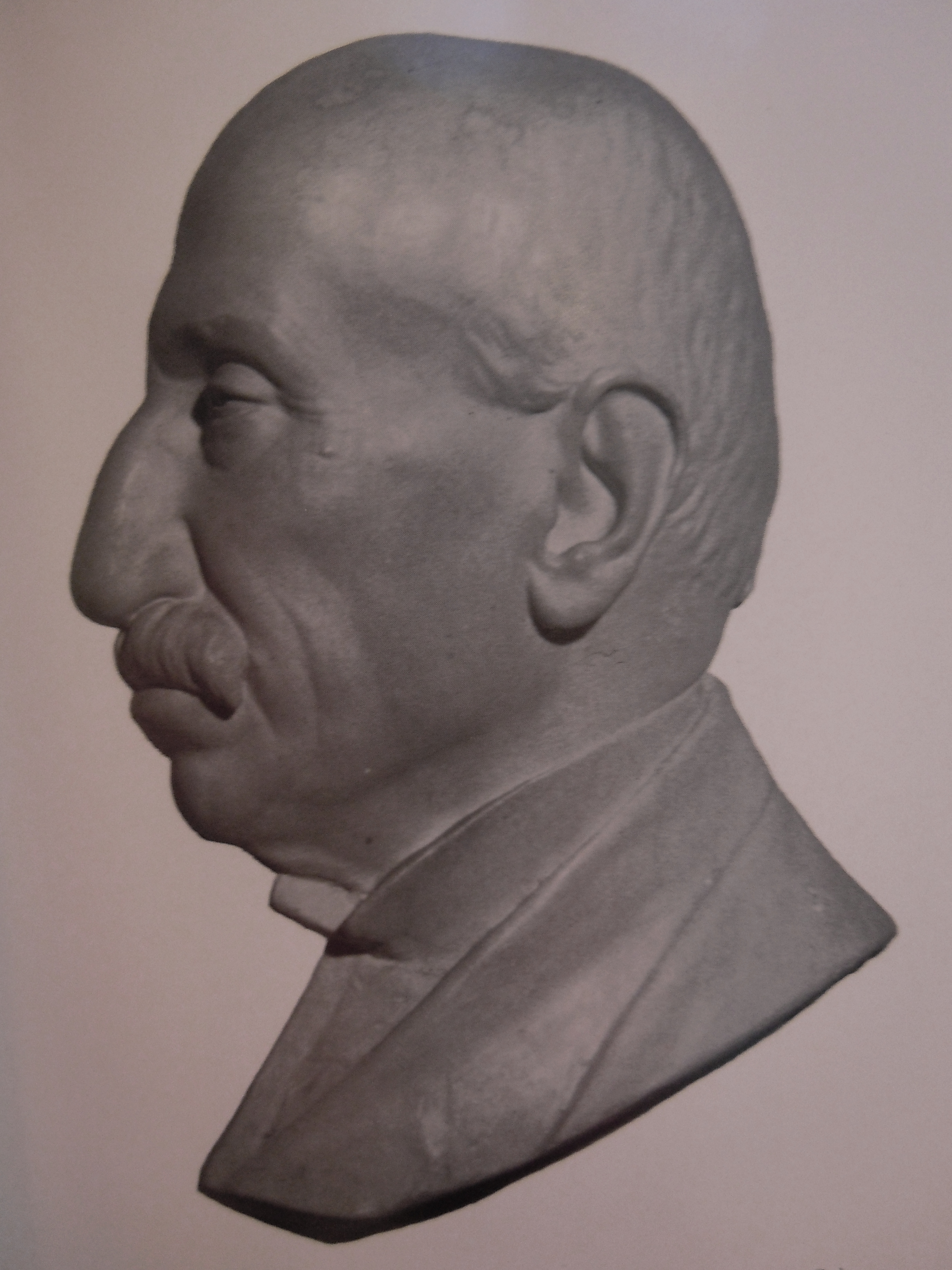
Original cast of the profile of Domenico Barduzzi sculpted by Emilio Gallori (1915)

He is portrayed in a bas-relief made by the Sienese sculptor Emilio Gallori in 1915, of which the original cast is kept in the Museum of the University of Siena, while bronze reproductions can be found in the aula magna of the Accademia dei Fisiocritici, on a plaque commemorating his home in Siena on Via S.Martino and on his grave in the cemetery of Brisighella.

== Major works ==
- Dell'uso del fosforo di zinco in alcune dermatosi croniche, Milano, Vallardi, 1874.
- Dell'idroterapia nelle febbri tifoidee, Raccoglitore Medico, II, Forlì, 1874.
- Della vaccinazione e della rivaccinazione obbligatoria, Giorn. Italiano Malattie Veneree e della Pelle, XI, aprile, Milano, 1876.
- Studi critici di terapia chirurgica, Raccoglitore Medico, V, Forlì, 1876.
- Il solfato di rame nella pellagra, Pisa, Vannucchi, 1877.
- La sifilide cerebrale, Gazz. degli Osped., Milano, 1878.
- La chirurgia di Ippocrate, Commentario Clinico, Pisa, 1878.
- I nuovi orizzonti della dermatologia e sifilografia, Pisa, Vannucchi, 1887.
- Sulla virulenza del bubbone venereo, Boll. della Sez. dei Cultori delle Scienze Mediche, V, 120, Siena, 1887
- Dell'efficacia dello ioduro di potassio nella terapia della psoriasi diffusa, Milano, Vallardi, 1888.
- Sulla profilassi pubblica della sifilide in rapporto con la prostituzione, Firenze, Niccolai, 1889.
- La malattia di Paget, Milano, Vallardi, 1890.
- Filippo Richard e la sua scuola, Milano, Vallardi, 1890.
- Sull'indisciplina delle nostre università, L'Unione Università, II, 300, Siena, 1895.
- La legislazione universitaria italiana e proposte di riforma, L'Unione Universitaria, II, 371, Siena, 1895.
- Terme di S.Giuliano, Siena, Lazzeri, 1898.
- Recenti conquiste nella guarigione della tubercolosi, Siena, Nava, 1899.
- Sul valore dell'alcool nella nutrizione degli operai, Bene Sociale, Perugia, 1901.
- Le acque minerali e le correzioni che si fanno in esse, Perugia, Unione Cooperativa, 1901.
- Per l'insegnamento della Storia della Medicina, L'Università Italiana, I, 45, Bologna, 1902
- Etat moleculaire et unique et radioactivitè des eaux minerales, Atti Congresso Fisioterapico, Roma, Nazionale, 1907.
- Della necessità di ripristinare nelle Università lo studio della storia critica della medicina, Faenza, Del Pozzo, 1911
- La tavola anatomica e di codici marciani, Riv. Storia Critica della Medicina, Faenza, 1911
- Le prime vaiolizzazioni in Italia, Riv. Storia Critica delle Scienze Med. e Nat., Grottaferrata, 1912.
- Le medichesse nell'epigrafia romana antica, Riv. Storia Critica delle Scienze Med. e Nat., II, 87, Grottaferrata, 1913.
- I libri di preparazioni anatomiche del dottor. Antonio Maria Vasalva, Riv. Storia Critica delle Scienze Med. e Nat., II, 355, Grottaferrata, 1914.
- La medicina nell'antica Roma nei poeti satirici latini, Riv. Storia Critica delle Scienze Med. e Nat., III, 55, Siena, 1919.
- Gentile da Foligno allo studio senese, Riv. Storia Critica delle Scienze Med. e Nat., Siena, 1919.
- Per un necessario provvedimento legislativo sanitario, Avvenire Sanitario, Milano, 1927.

== See also ==
- Dermatology
- Venereology
- Hydrology
- History of medicine

== Bibliography ==
- Andreassi, Lucio; et al. (1987). Domenico Barduzzi. Memorie n.3. Siena: Accademia delle Scienze di Siena detta dei Fisiocritici.
- Crespi, Mario (1964). "Barduzzi, Domenico". Dizionario Biografico degli Italiani (in Italian). Vol. 6: Baratteri–Bartolozzi. Rome: Institute of the Italian Encyclopaedia. OCLC 883370.
