= San Pietro Apostolo, Montecatini Terme =

Church in Tuscany, Italy

Coordinates: 43.89735°N 10.78817°E

San Pietro Apostolo
- Chiesa di San Pietro Apostolo
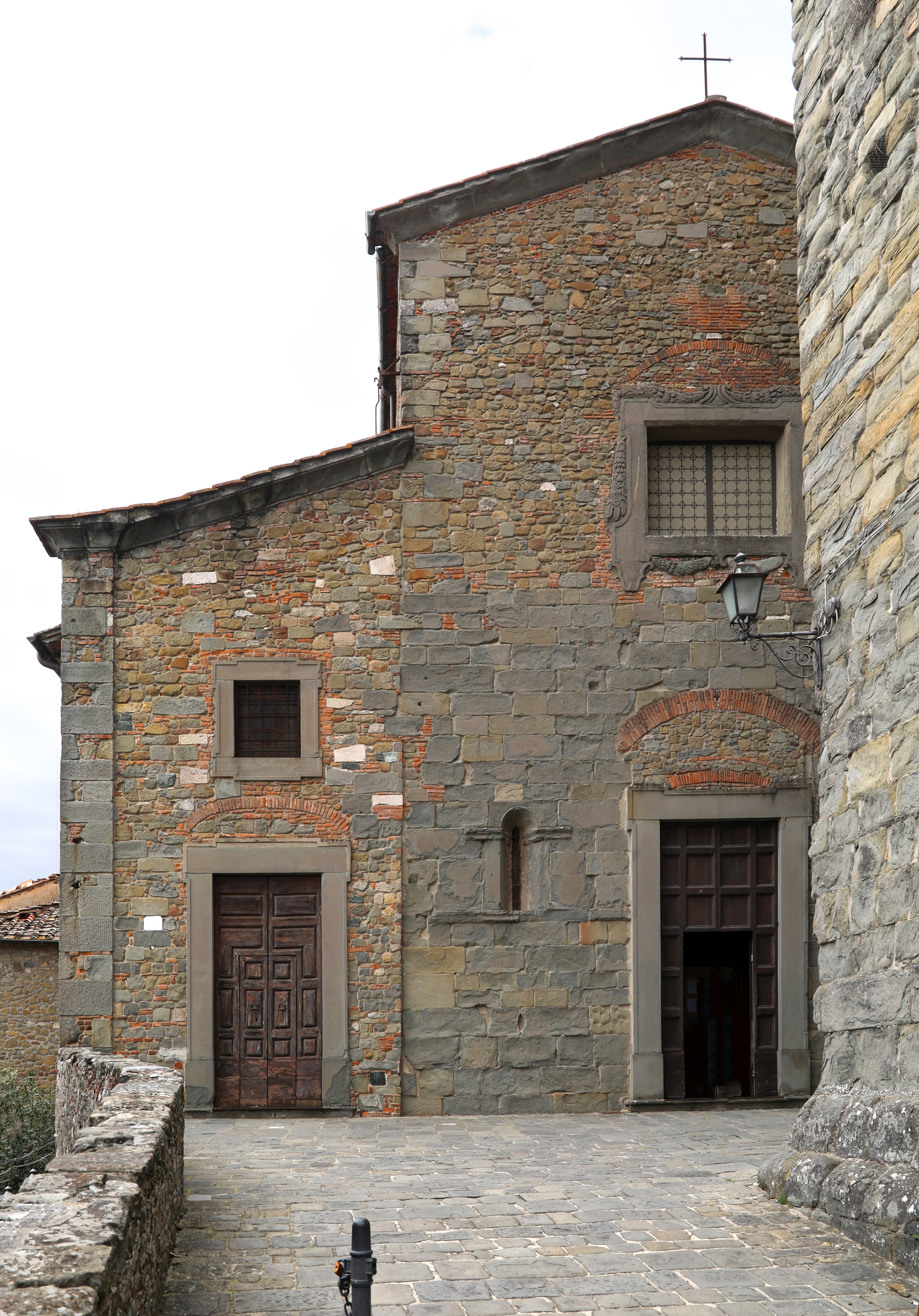
- Façade of San Pietro Apostolo in Montecatini Alto
- Location: Piazza della Fortezza 7, Montecatini Alto, Montecatini Terme, Tuscany
- Country: Italy
- Denomination: Roman Catholic
- Website: Official site

History
- Dedication: Saint Peter the Apostle

Architecture
- Functional status: Active
- Architect: Antonio Zannoni (expansion)
- Style: Romanesque, Baroque

Specifications
- Materials: Stone, brick, stucco

Administration
- Diocese: Diocese of Pescia
- Parish: Parrocchia di San Pietro Apostolo

San Pietro Apostolo is a Roman Catholic parish church located on Piazza della Fortezza #7 in the upper town (Montecatini Alto) of Montecatini Terme, province of Pistoia, region of Tuscany, Italy.

== History ==
The present church still retains some Romanesque elements from an original church, likely the chapel or church located inside a former castle, and dedicated to St Michael Archangel, a saint favored by Lombards. When the parish responsibilities of the rural church of San Pietro in Neure were transposed inside the medieval walls of the town and into this church, the rededication occurred. A major refurbishment took place in the 18th century, when it was enlarged to have three aisles, under the designs of Antonio Zannoni. Some of the interior columns derive from the earlier Romanesque church. In a survey of 1896, the interior of the church had altarpieces including a Concezione by Ranieri del Pace; a Resurrection and Saints by Santi di Tito; and two marble alatar by Marco Moretti. In the church museum is a Reliquary of Santa Barbara, attributed to Benvenuto Cellini or one of his followers.
