= Edoardo Collamarini =

Italian architect, active mainly in Bologna

Edoardo Collamarini (1863–1928) was an Italian architect, active mainly in Bologna, region of Emilia Romagna, Italy.

He was born and died in Bologna. He studied there and in Parma. He was a friend of Giosuè Carducci, and pupil of Alfonso Rubbiani. He designed a number of tombs in the Certosa of Bologna such as the Talon Chapel (1929). Among his main works is the Neo-Byzantine-style church of Sacro Cuore di Gesù (1912). This style is also reflected in his Santuario della Madonna del Sangue at Re, completed only by 1928.

Prince Alfonso Doria Pamphilj commissioned from him in 1890 the design of the Doria chapel (1897–1902) at the Villa Pamphilj in Rome, with Romanesque and Cosmatesque elements. He also designed the Palace of the Banca Popolare di Pesaro, the facade of the Sanctuary of Monticino at Brisighella, the Pavilion of Emiliano-Romagnolo for the 1911 Artistic Exposition of Rome. He worked on the refurbishment of Santo Stefano (1911–1925). In 1925, he helped refurbish the church of San Giovanni Battista di Calamosco.

Collamarini submitted a design for the facade of the Pescia Cathedral, however it was not adopted. In 1902, he also submitted a design for a campus plan for the University of Berkeley in California.

In 1928, the journal Comune di Bologna in a posthumous elogy said of Collamarini that he was a:

follower of the theories of Viollet-le-Duc, but who has the merit in that he avoids in his creations the influence of the gothic architecture from Northern Europe, which maladapted and poorly applied by other architects and engineers of the 19th century, the most hybrid and dead structures... during the decadent Umbertine style ... It can be said (Collamarini) truly was a christian artist because in his churches and work, while he was inspired specially by medieval art, he has infused into his work a mystical and religious sentiment that modern art commonly has forgot.
