= Pieve di San Giovanni in Ottavo, Brisighella =

Church in Brisighella, Italy

Coordinates: 44.21440°N 11.75282°E

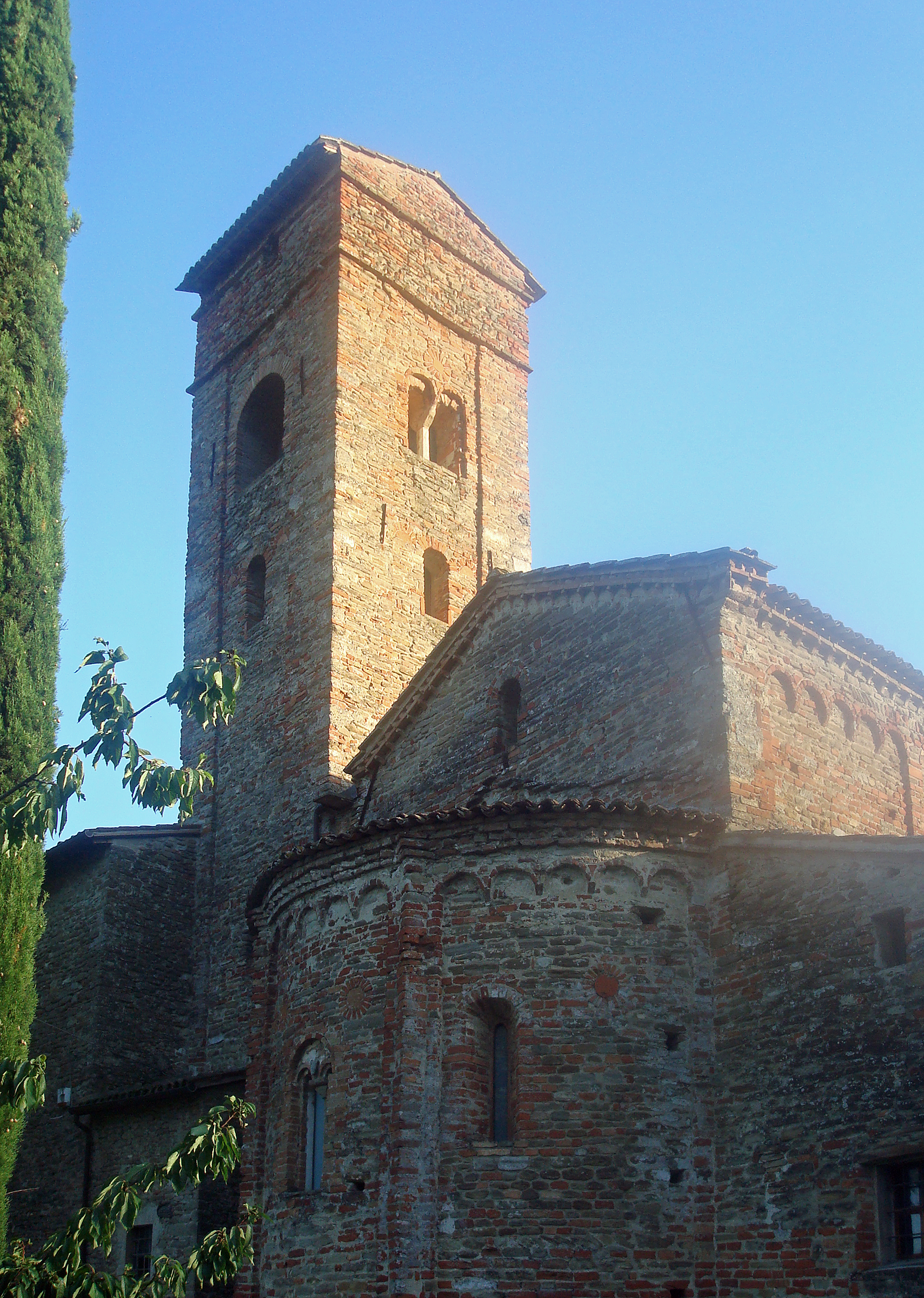
Apse and belltower of church

The Pieve di San Giovanni in Ottavo, also known as the Pieve del Thò, is a Romanesque-style, Roman Catholic, rural church located on Via Siepi #2 about 2 kilometers southwest of in the town of Brisighella, province of Ravenna, Italy. The pieve's name derives from that in medieval times, it was measured to be located at the eighth mile of the Via Faventina (oggi Faentina); this was the ancien road that lead from Faenza across the Apennines toward Florence.

== Description ==
The inclusion into the substructure (crypt) of this church of Ancient Roman and paleo-Christian tombs is evidence that a place of worship was present here for centuries before the first mention of a church in documents from 909 AD. The church layout has three naves rising upon columns of either marble and granite, deriving from different sources and some of different sizes suggesting that they were derived a spolia from prior buildings. One column bears inscriptions from the era of the Roman emperor Valentinian II. The semicircular apse is the end of the central nave. The facade atypically faces south. The square bell tower rising to the right of the presbytery dates to about the year 1000. The crypts of the church underwent archeologic restoration during the 1990s leading to the discovery of a number of ancient burials.
