= San Giovanni Battista di Calamosco =

Roman Catholic church

Coordinates: 44.528944°N 11.397119°E

San Giovanni Battista di Calamosco is a Roman Catholic parish church located on via Chiesa Calamosco #2 in the San Donato Quarter of Bologna, region of Emilia Romagna, Italy.

== History ==
The parish is mentioned since 1088, while a church is documented since 1269. The present church was erected in 1729–30 by designs of Antonio Gamberini. It was refurbished in 1925 by Edoardo Collamarini.

The baroque interior has seven side altars. The main altarpiece is a Birth of St John the Baptist attributed to Marcantonio Franceschini. The second altar to the right has a canvas depicting St Antony of Padua; the third a Madonna della Scodella, a copy of a Correggio painting. The first altar on the left has a stucco crucifix. The second altar to the left has a St Vincent Ferrer by Ubaldo Gandolfi. The baptistry has a modern sculpture by Cesarino Vincenzi.
