= Santuario della Madonna del Sangue =

Sanctuary in Re, Italy

Coordinates: 46.1304°N 8.5450°E

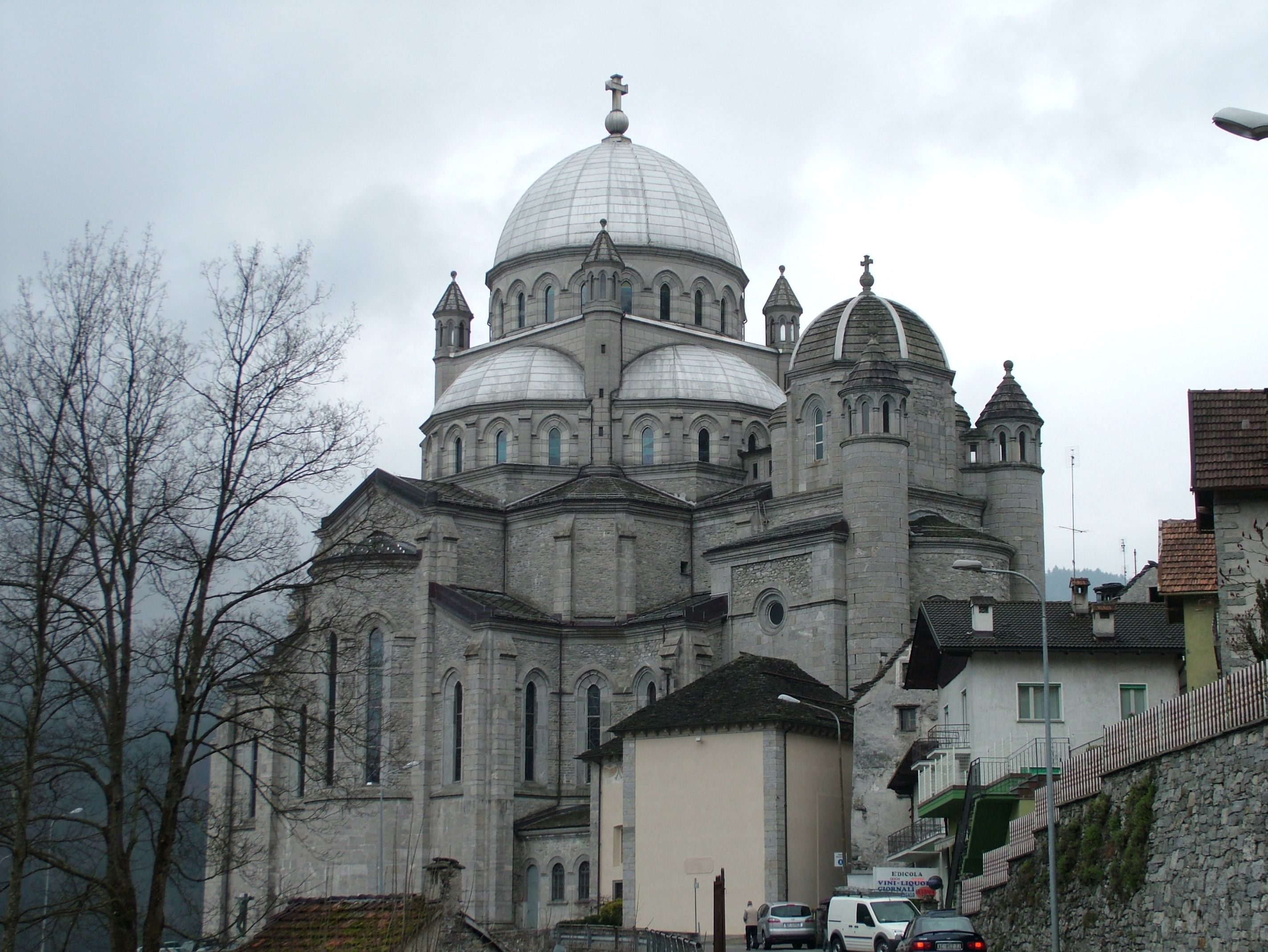
The basilica of the Madonna del Sangue

The Santuario della Madonna del Sangue is a sanctuary in the comune (municipality) of Re, Italy. It is devoted to the Virgin Mary and it was built where in 1494 a miracle occurred: a small fresco of the Nursing Madonna was hit by a stone and started bleeding.

This sanctuary is the destination of many pilgrimages from the area and is the most important religious place in Val Vigezzo. This church is part of the Via del Mercato, an itinerary of CoEur - In the heart of European paths.

== History and description ==
Only many years after the miracle, in 1627, the bishop of Novara, Carlo Bascapè, inaugurated the first sanctuary, built thanks to his initiative.

The basilica in Byzantine Revival architecture visible today was inaugurated on 5 August 1958. Designed by the architect Edoardo Collamarini, it has been built entirely by local masons and artisans and it was raised to the dignity of Minor basilica by Pope Pius XII in 1958.

== See also ==
- CoEur - In the heart of European paths
- Path of Saint Charles
