= Sanctuary of the Madonna of Monticino, Brisighella =

Church in Brisighella, Italy

Coordinates: 44.22451°N 11.76679°E

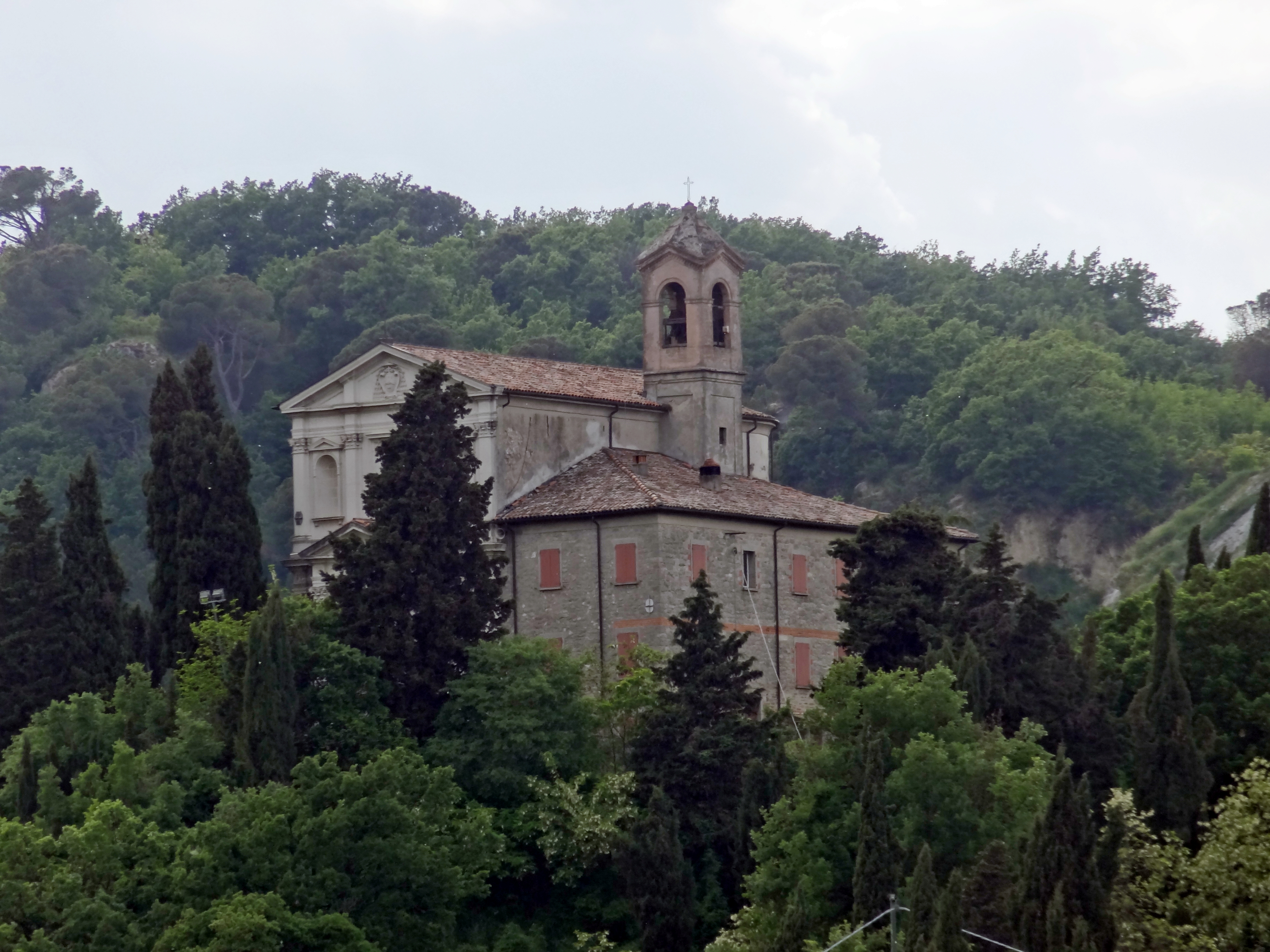
Church and bell-tower

The Sanctuary of the Madonna of Monticino, in Italian, Santuario della Madonna del Monticino is a Neoclassical-style, Roman Catholic, sanctuary church located on Via Rontana on a hill-top to the northwest of the center of the town of Brisighella, province of Ravenna, Italy.

== Description ==
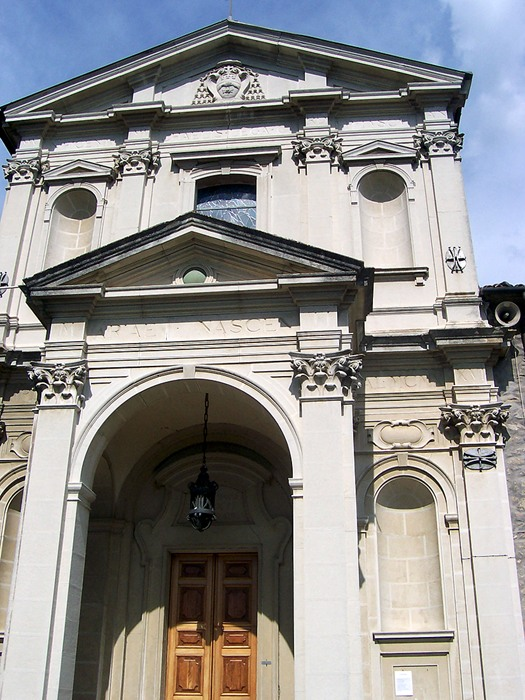
Neoclassical facade with cardinal Lega's Coat of arms in the tympanum

A church at the site was built to shelter a revered icon of the Madonna and child, that had been previously placed in 1626 in a pillar outside of Porta Bonfante, along a pilgrimage road. The town council in 1662 decided to move the venerated image to a small oratory, atop Monte Cozzolo, also called Monte Calvario, and now called Monticino. In 1758, the oratory was replaced by the present church. In the apse are frescoes by the nineteenth century painter Savino Lega. The icon is now sheltered in a small round frame behind the altar. The church remained unfinished for decades, until in 1926 under the patronage of cardinal Michele Lega, the present facade was added using a design by the architect Edoardo Collamarini. Since 1662, in honor of the Madonna del Monticino, the town holds a fair (sagra).
