= Montecatini Terme =

Municipality in Tuscany, Italy

- Comune
- Comune di Montecatini Terme
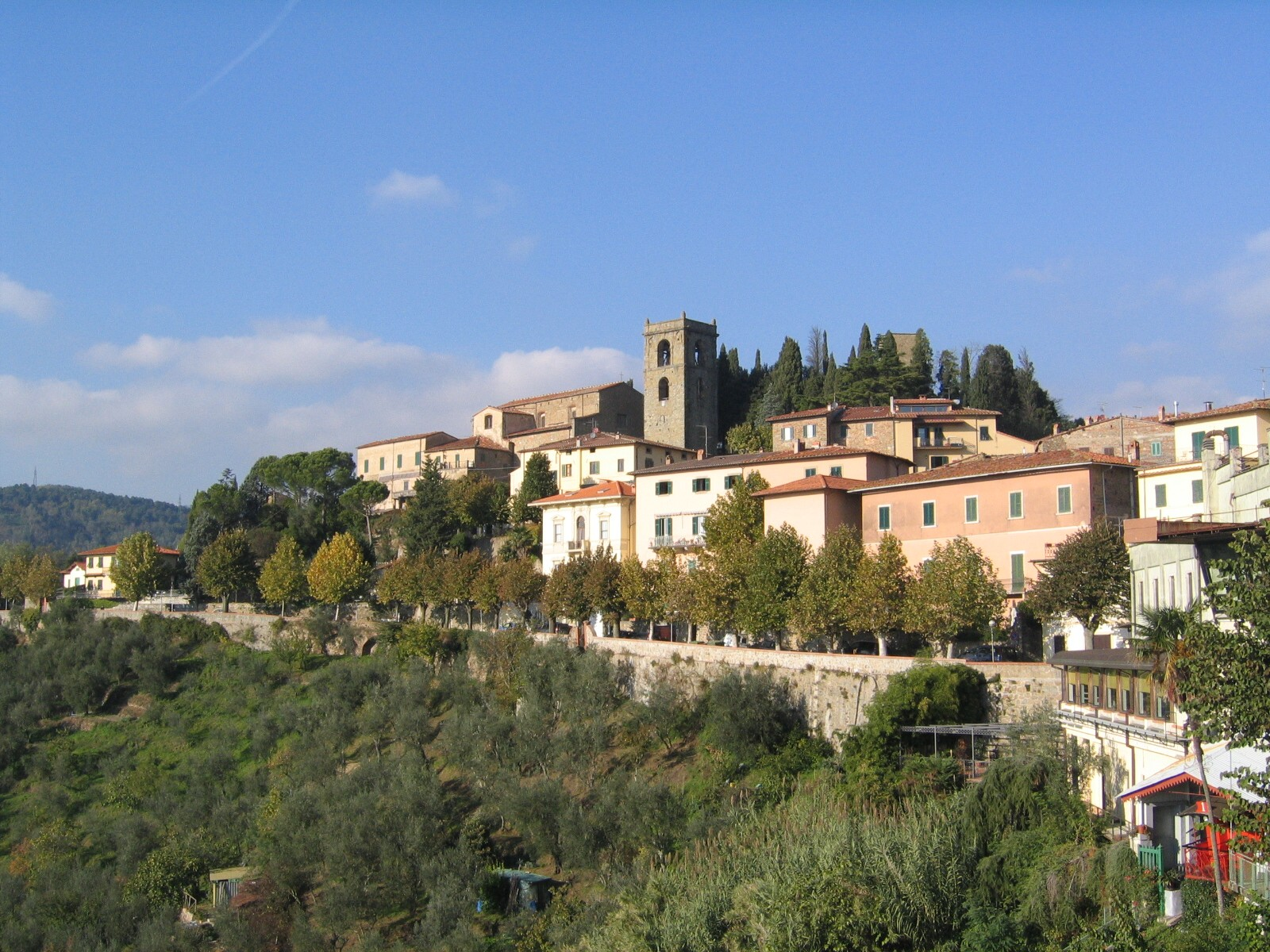
- View of Montecatini Terme

- Location within Italy Location within Tuscany
- Coordinates: 43°52′58″N 10°46′16″E
- Country: Italy
- Region: Tuscany
- Province: Pistoia (PT)
- Frazioni: Montecatini Alto, Nievole, Vico

Government
  - Mayor: Luca Baroncini

Area
  - Total: 17.69 km^{2} (6.83 sq mi)
- Elevation: 29 m (95 ft)

Population (30 November 2016)
  - Total: 20,474
  - Density: 1,157/km^{2} (2,998/sq mi)
- Demonym: Montecatinesi
- Time zone: UTC+1 (CET)
  - Summer (DST): UTC+2 (CEST)
- Postal code: 51016
- Dialing code: 0572
- Patron saint: St. Barbara
- Saint day: 4 December
- Website: Official website

UNESCO World Heritage Site
- Part of: The Great Spa Towns of Europe
- Criteria: Cultural: (ii)(iii)
- Reference: 1613
- Inscription: 2021 (44th Session)

Montecatini Terme (Montecatini-Terme, according to ISTAT documentation) is an Italian comune (municipality) of c. 20,000 inhabitants in the province of Pistoia, in the Italian region of Tuscany. It is the most important center in Valdinievole. The town is located at the eastern end of Piana di Lucca and has a strong tourism industry, as well as industrial and commercial industries related to the spa, which in turn has increased the interest in hotel accommodation in the region.

In 2021, the town became part of the transnational "Great Spa Towns of Europe" UNESCO World Heritage Site, because of its famous mineral springs and its architecture exemplifying the popularity of spa resorts in Europe during the 18th through 20th centuries.

== History ==
The presence of humans in the area of Montecatini is very old. Probably from Paleolithic times the region was frequented by itinerant hunters, but only from the Mesolithic period is there evidence of numerous settlements, especially in the hills of the Valdinievole. Records of the thermal springs in the region date at least as far back as the Romans.

=== From Medieval times to the Medici ===
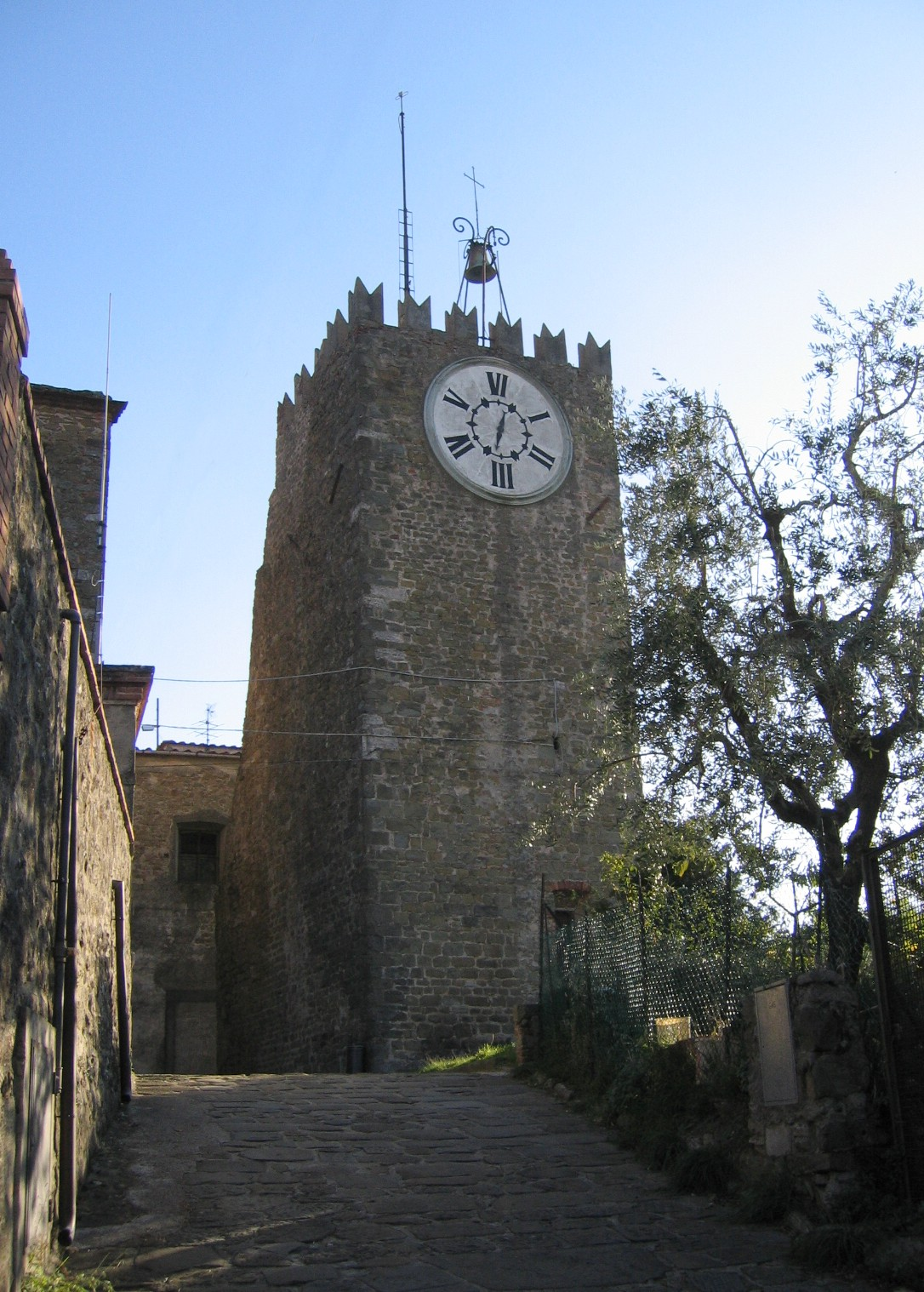
La Torre dell'Orologio in Montecatini Alto

Montecatini Castello, today's Montecatini Alto, was documented by medieval times. In the settlement there was already a spa, thanks to the salt waters of the city, which later also flowed into the plain below. There is evidence for this in a document from 1340 which refers to the extraction of salt from the water. There is also proof in a letter sent by the merchant Francesco di Marco Datini in which he requests from his doctor the healing water of the Montecatini baths.

Other evidence comes from the famous doctor Ugolino of Montecatini who examined the waters scientifically for the first time. He also tells us that there were three baths in Montecatini; the Bagno Della Regina, the Bagno dei Merli and the Bagno Nuovo. Today the Bagno Nuovo is known as the Tettuccio.

Conditions in the town during medieval times were difficult, the region was plagued by epidemics, paludic diseases (attributed to the influence of marshes, such diseases including malaria) and wars. The battles locally between Florence, Pisa and Lucca, often forced townsfolk to seek refuge to the surrounding hills, because the town was the scene of continuous clashes. We must also remember that Montecatini was mainly constituted of padule (marshes). Livy confirms this when he described how Hannibal of Carthage passed by the padule of Fucecchio in his march to the south.

From the 10th century until 1270 with the Republic of Lucca, attempts were made to reclaim the territory, which was affected by epidemics of malaria. However the work was not completed successfully and resulted in pools of water being created where the water stagnated.

In these muddy waters many men found death at the Battle of Montecatini in 1315. It is thought that Dante Alighieri participated in this battle. In 1328 the Medici came to power and the locks that had been dismantled with the reclamation were restored.

=== From the rule of the Medici in the Valdinievole to the House of Habsburg-Lorraine ===
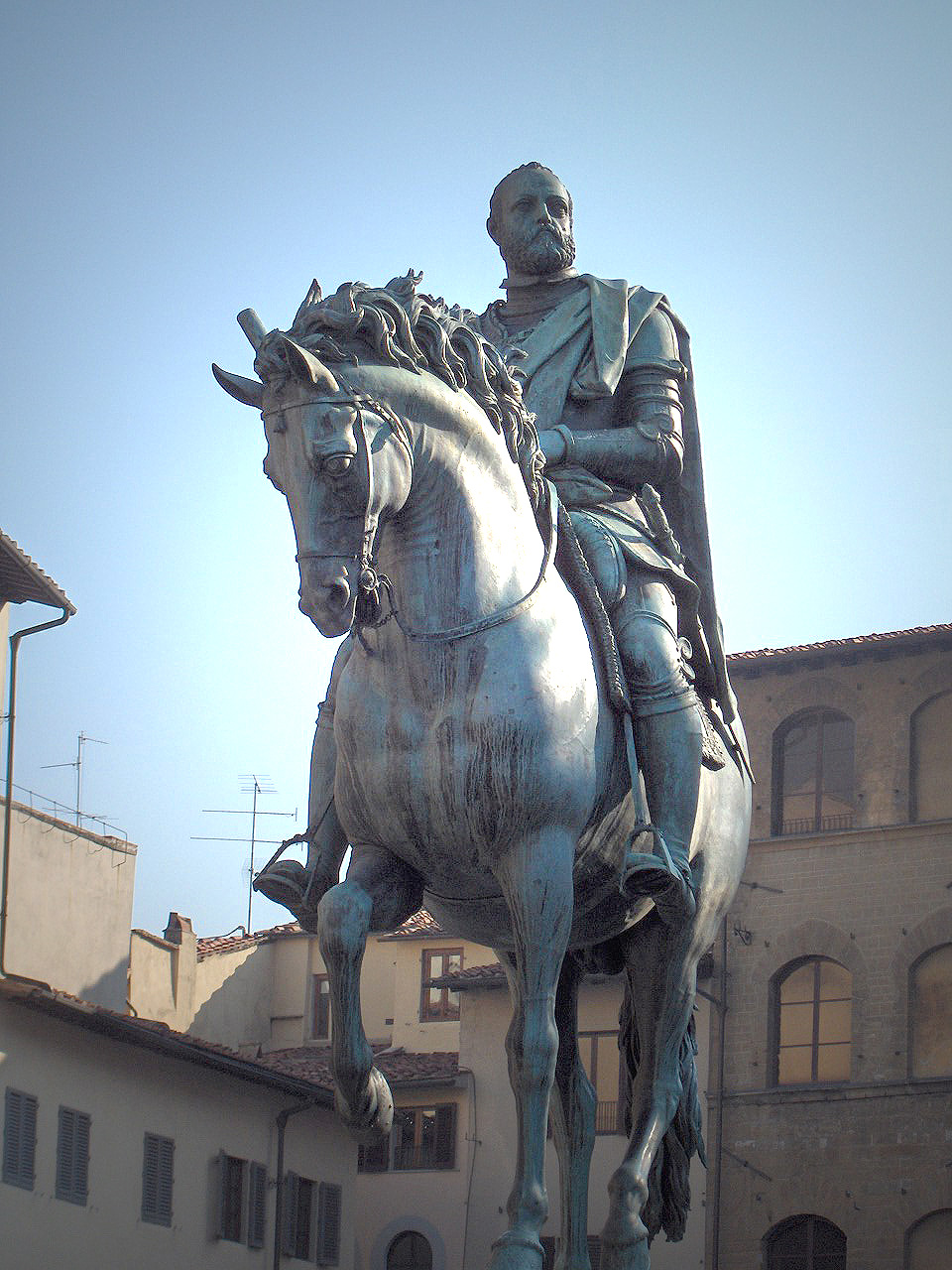
Equestrian statue of Cosimo I, by Giambologna (Piazza della Signoria, Florence)

In 1339, the Valdinievole was conquered by the Florentine armies led by the Medici in Florence, but this did not bring rapid benefits to the Baths and the City of Montecatini.

Cosimo Medici was the first person to build a bridge-dam to cross the muddy waters of the area. The initiative brought great economic improvements, but it was detrimental to the inhabitants of the Valdinievole. In 1447, Florence approved a contribution to the restoration of the buildings belonging to the Baths. Because of its location, Montecatini was often a battlefield. In fact, in 1554, it was the center of the clash between the emperor Charles V, allied with Cosimo I, and the Sienese and French militias which, under the command of Pietro Strozzi, were stationed in the castle of Montecatini. As a result, Cosimo had the castle dismantled.

In 1529, the owner of the Baths of Montecatini had financial problems so he offered them to Cosimo, who would become Duke in 1532, and Grand Duke, thanks to his nomination by Pope Pius V, in 1569. Since the consort of Cosimo, Eleonora of Toledo, made frequent use of the waters of Montecatini, the Medici had the baths analyzed by their agents. However, the proposal did not go through. In 1538, the offer was made again to Francis I, son of Cosimo. However, he had to grant the use of the baths to the citizens of Montecatini. In those years, the population and the economy of the Valdinievole grew. However, between 1500 and 1756, there were repeated epidemics because of the flooding of the meadows, forests, fields, and pastures, due to the collapse of the bridge at Cappiano.

During their regency, the Medici profited from renting farms and fishing. As a result, there were lawsuits to defend the residents of the area and to enable them to pay for the reclamation of the padule with the money they recovered.

=== House of Habsburg-Lorraine: founders of the spa town ===
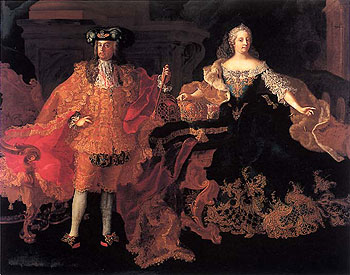
Francesco I di Lorena and Maria Teresa d'Austria. Portrait dressed for their coronation in 1745.

Francesco I of Lorraine and Maria Teresa of Austria went to Florence in 1739 and stayed there for three months. They then entrusted the government to a Council of Regency that operated until 1765. The Regency tried to resolve promptly the problem of reclaiming the marshes, but the whole thing was more difficult than expected. In those years, epidemics, fevers and famines again appeared. To solve the problem it was necessary to settle the land near the padule by channeling the springs that were stagnating in the Valdinievole and invigorating the agriculture and livestock. In 1765, with the death of Francesco, Pietro Leopoldo assumed the title of Grand Duke, as his mother, Maria Teresa of Austria, had scrupulously prepared him for the responsibilities of reigning. Unfortunately, as a second son, he only inherited the throne in Vienna during the last two years of his life (1790–92). In 1765 he arrived in Tuscany and immediately proved himself open to innovation. During his regency he reformed governance from Palazzo Pitti into towards a far more progressive government than his predecessors. He was also an innovator in the management of the economy, public administration, health and science. He went several times to Montecatini to understand first-hand the problems of the Valdinievole and as a result the story of the baths began with the Grand Duke Leopold of Tuscany. He had the territory inspected by scholars and tried to make the just and reasonable decisions for it. The Grand Duke went to Montecatini in 1772 and ordered the demolition of the locks and the weirs of Ponte a Cappiano. The channeling of the thermo-mineral waters and the restoration of the city began. Pietro Leopoldo returned many times, even with his family, to Montecatini to check the state of the works. On 1 March 1790 he left Florence to return for Vienna to succeed his brother Josef who had died.

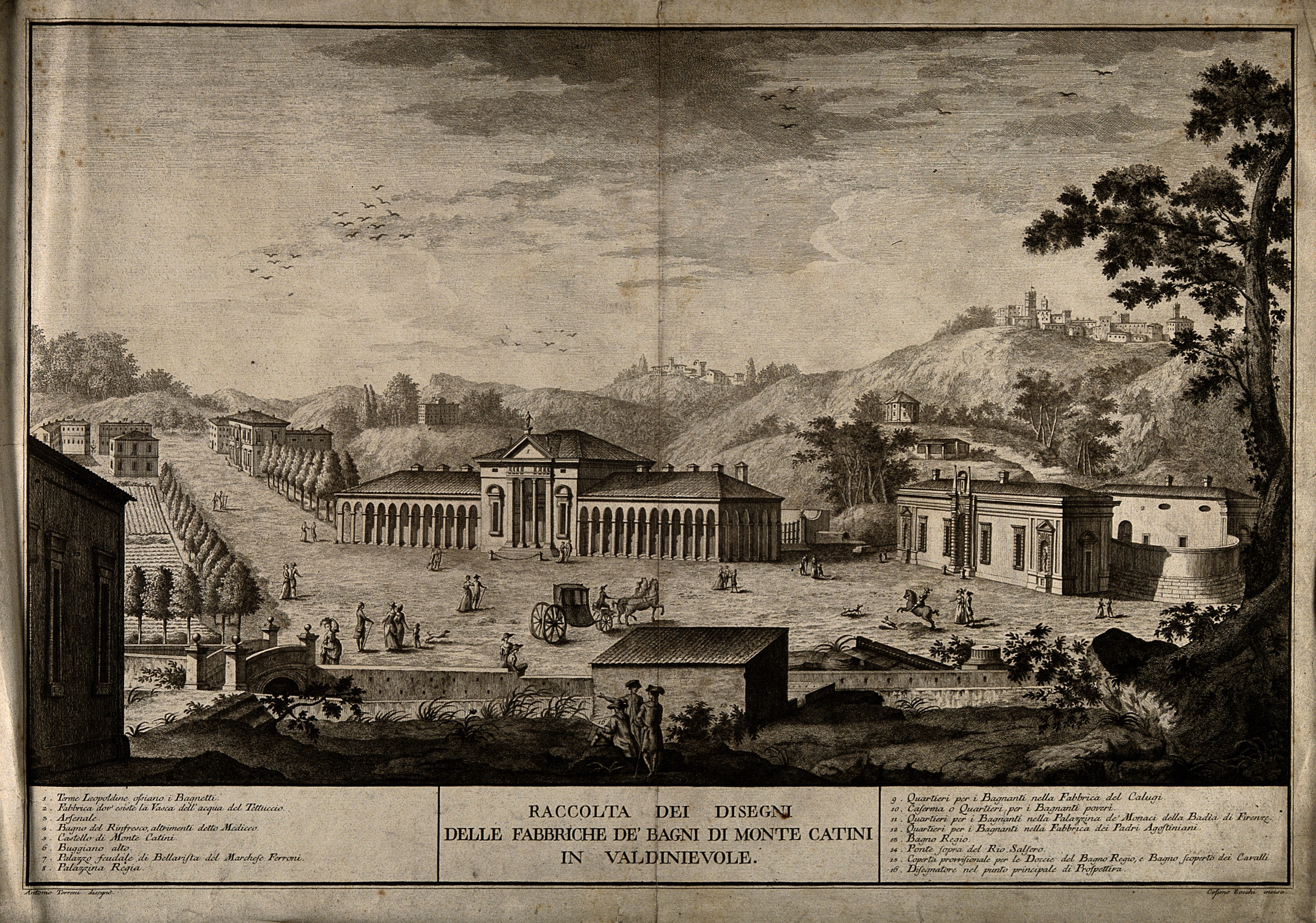
Montecatini Terme in the 19th century

The third Habsburg-Lorraine Grand Duke was Ferdinando III who came to rule when only 21 years old. He wavered in his support for Napoleonic rule, and by 1801 faced exile to Austria. Restored to rule on 10 June 1817, Ferdinando decreed the Bagni di Montecatini complex was granted to the community and they were given money to keep them efficient. On 18 June 1818 the baths were put under the management of a committee up of esteemed people of the time, including Giuseppe Giusti's father. With this new administration of the baths there were innovations and improvements. When Ferdinando III died, he was succeeded by Leopold II who is remembered for the reclamation work in the Maremma and for the construction of railways and roads. Leopold II also collaborated in the construction of the Locanda Maggiore. The Lorraine period concluded with the Risorgimento and the end of the Grand Duchy occurred in 1859. In 1860 Montecatini came under the Province of Lucca with its headquarters in Montecatini Alto. In 1889, thanks to an international medical congress in Florence, the city commenced activity in the field of thermal medicine. In the same year, the urban project proposed and initiated by Pietro Leopoldo was extended and improved.

=== Twentieth century ===
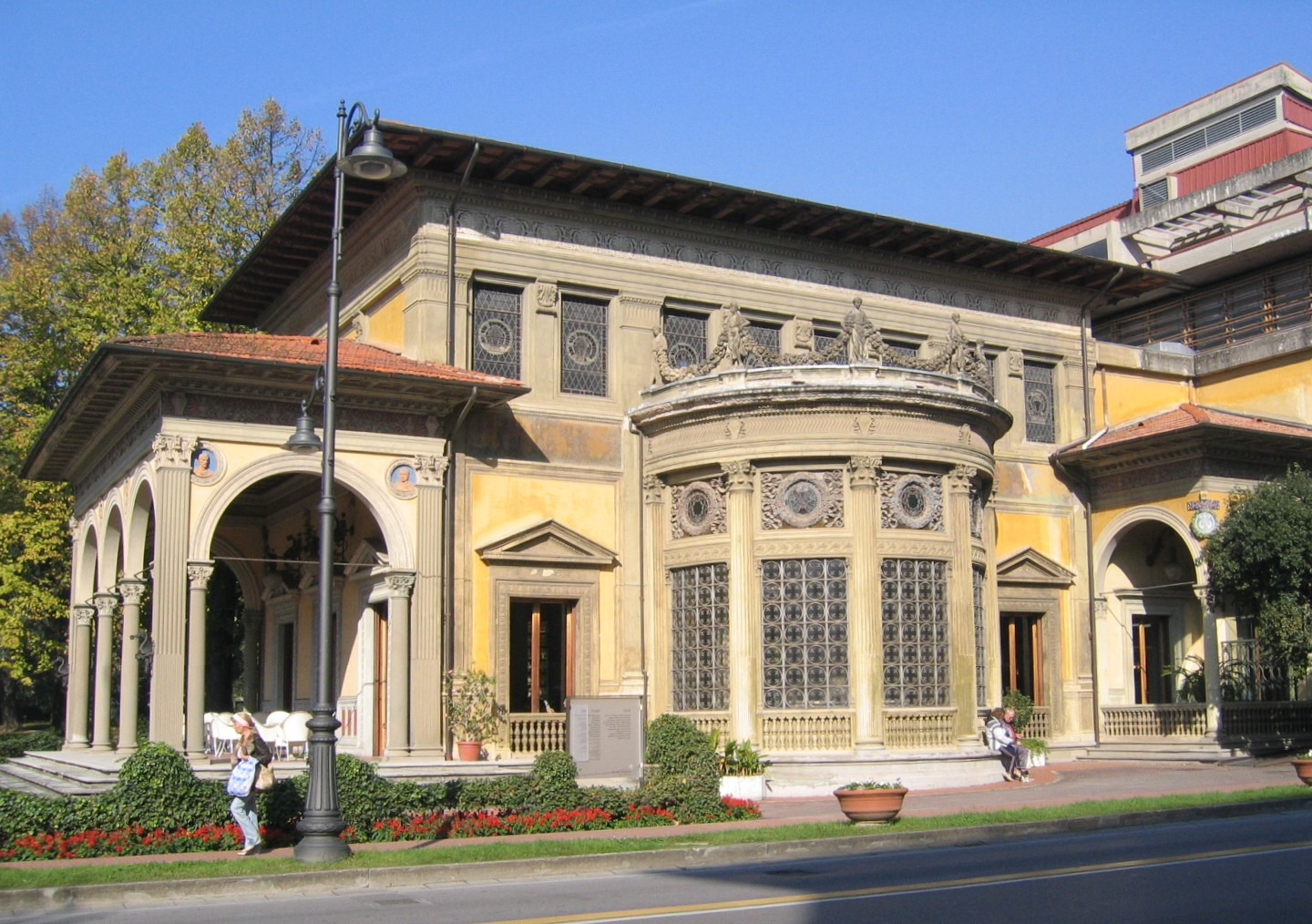
Terme Excelsior

On 16 June 1905, Montecatini Alto and Bagni di Montecatini became autonomous municipal entities. On 28 October 1928 the name of the Bagni di Montecatini was changed to Montecatini Terme. In 1928 the municipality of Montecatini, together with all the other municipalities of the Valdinievole, passed from the province of Lucca to the newly formed province of Pistoia. Between 1904 and 1915 the Torretta and Excelsior establishments were born. Giovannozzi restored the Leopoldine and Tettuccio baths between 1919 and 1928. Mussolini also went to the establishments to see how the funds given by the State for their restoration had been spent and entrusted their administration to Schweiger.

In 1958, the State reappropriated the baths, symbolizing a second phase with the reconstruction of the Redi and Excelsior baths. Montecatini in those years was frequented by important persons; nobility and people from the worlds of entertainment and politics. In 1970 the baths remained open all year, but from that moment on there has been a slow decline until today, when the fashion for visiting the spa has clearly diminished. Efforts to relaunch the baths began in the 1990s and the City succeeded in doing this in 2000.

The emblem of the municipality is regulated by the Royal Decree of 12 August 1908. It is a truncated shield: the first version is of Montecatini which is blue and mounted on six small Italian hills, supporting two gold lions surrounded by an oval silver shield laden with a red lily, facing each other and holding a red basin; in the second version everything is handled in silver and blue. The motto, also present in the coat of arms and in the banner states: «Salus» (Latin: Health).

== Mineral springs ==
There are 11 thermal springs in the area around Montecatini Terme, with temperatures ranging from 24 to 33.4 degrees C. Of those, six have been used for their supposed therapeutic qualities. These springs all come from the same source: an aquifer fed by meteoric waters roughly 60–80 meters below ground level. These waters get their minerals from being in contact with Triassic-period strata of calcareous stone, travertine, jasper and limestone.

== Monuments and places of interest ==
=== Religious architecture ===
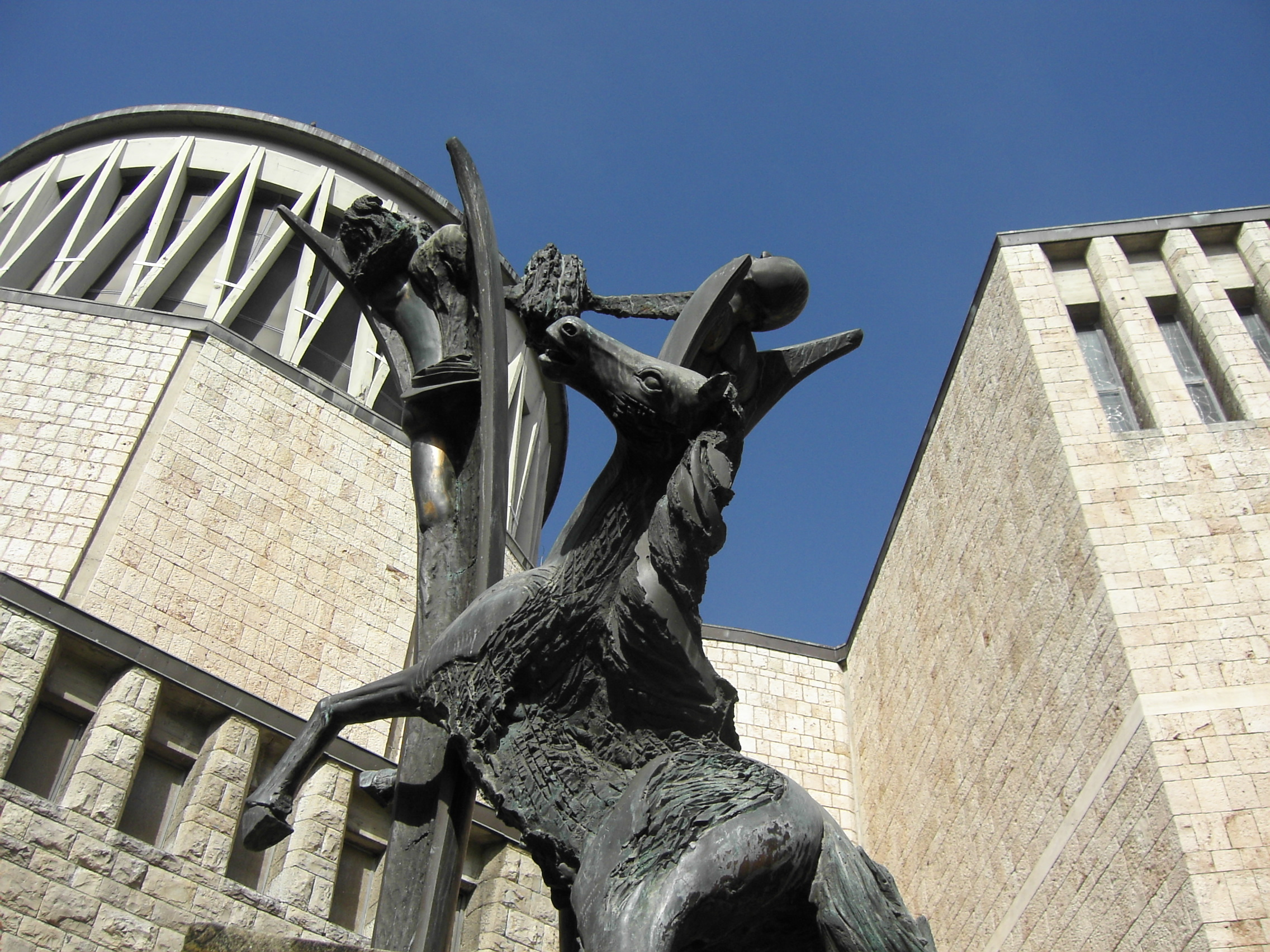
Part of the Church of Santa Maria Assunta

- The Church of Santa Maria Assunta (1962). The decision to build a religious edifice was taken in 1824. Work on the current building began in 1957 and finished in 1962. It is an octagonal building with four lateral chapels and a presbytery.
- The Church of Saints Jacopo and Filippo (or Carmine) (1764), located in Montecatini Alto. It was almost completely rebuilt in 1764 in Baroque style above a Romanesque building. It has a saddle-roofed façade.
- The San Pietro Apostolo (17th century), originally the church of the castle of Montecatini. It became a parish church in the twelfth century, when the edifice was completely rebuilt. The present façade, which replaced a massive medieval tower, forms the end of the apse of the Romanesque church and was transformed into its present form in the seventeenth century. In the interior important works are preserved.
- The Convent and Church of Santa Maria a Ripa (16th century). The monastic building is characterized by its severe style. The church is accessed via a stone staircase, probably dating back to the Romanesque era, as is the façade with its saddle-roof. Inside there is a single nave with vaulted ceilings and eighteenth century frescoes that have been brought to light.

=== Civic architecture ===
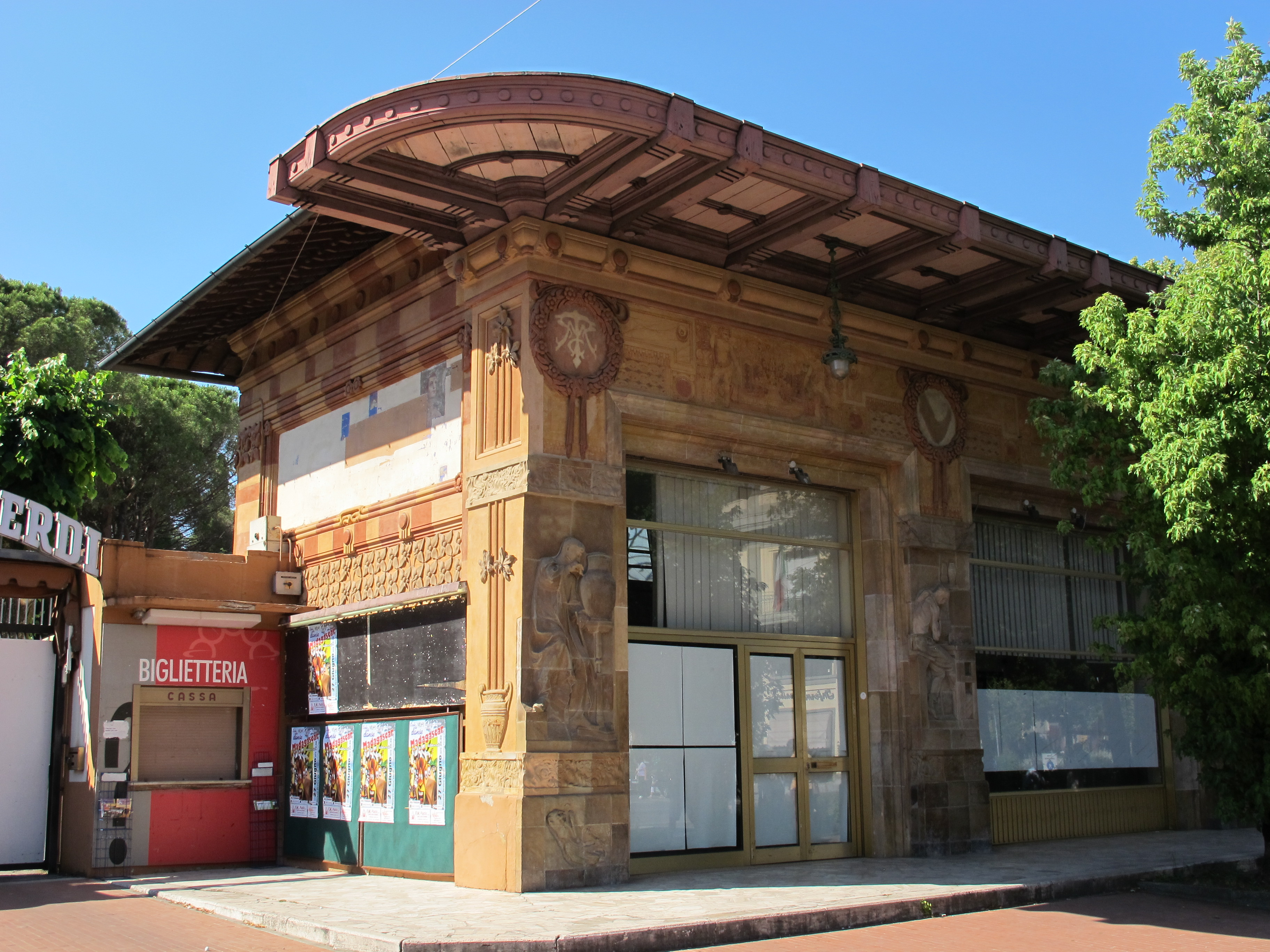
Il Padiglioncino Tamerici

- Villa Forini Lippi (17th century) already existed in the seventeen hundreds. The present complex is the result of an aggregation of rural buildings. The façade is characterized by a beautiful staircase with a double stone ramp surmounted by an elegant loggia with three arches supported by balusters. Surrounded by a park of almost two hectares, the villa is currently home to the municipal library.
- Palazzo Comunale (1914). Inside there are rich plaster decorations executed mostly by the firm of Alessandro del Soldato. The interior hall is interesting because of its double height and cantilevered balcony that divides the space into two overlapping Corinthian orders.
- The Padiglioncino Tamerici (1902) was built "for the storage and sale of Tameric salt". With its formal Art Nouveau (Stilo Liberty) and floral design, it is an exception in the town's architectural style. It is rich in bas-reliefs inspired by the manufacture of ceramics and represent the artist, the potter, the decorator and the kiln operator.
- The railway station (1937) has actually been active since 1853. The current building was inaugurated on 4 August 1937 because, with the increasing popularity of the spa, it had become necessary to build a larger one. The project was designed by the architect Angiolo Mazzoni.
- Teatro Verdi (1829), was designed between 1828 and 1829 by the architect Lodovico Fortini as a large open air theatre in the amusement park owned by the "Società delle Nuove Terme". It was inaugurated in 1930 with Giuseppe Verdi's Aida. In 1981 the theatre was extensively refurbished.

=== Spa complex ===
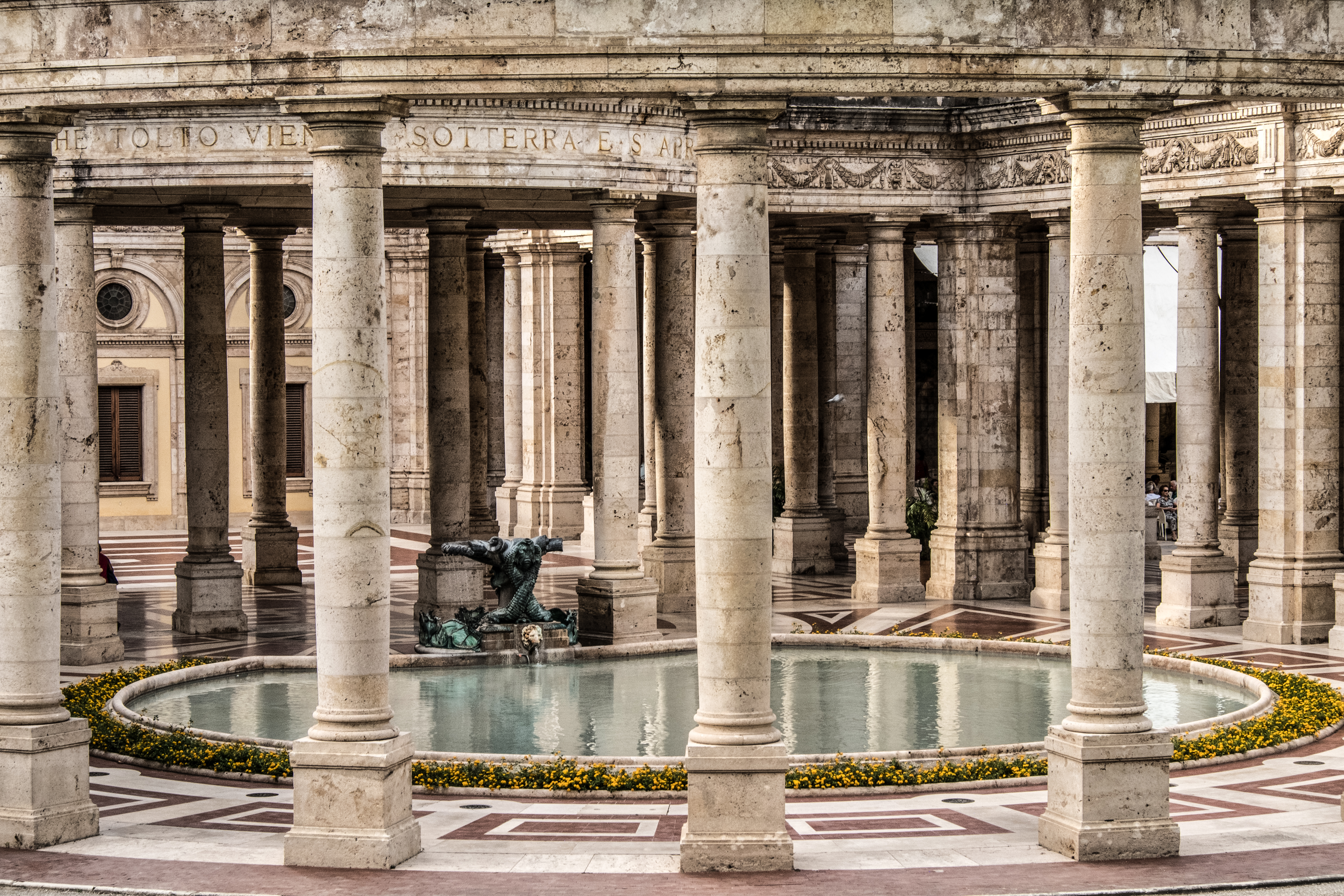
The Terme Tettuccio

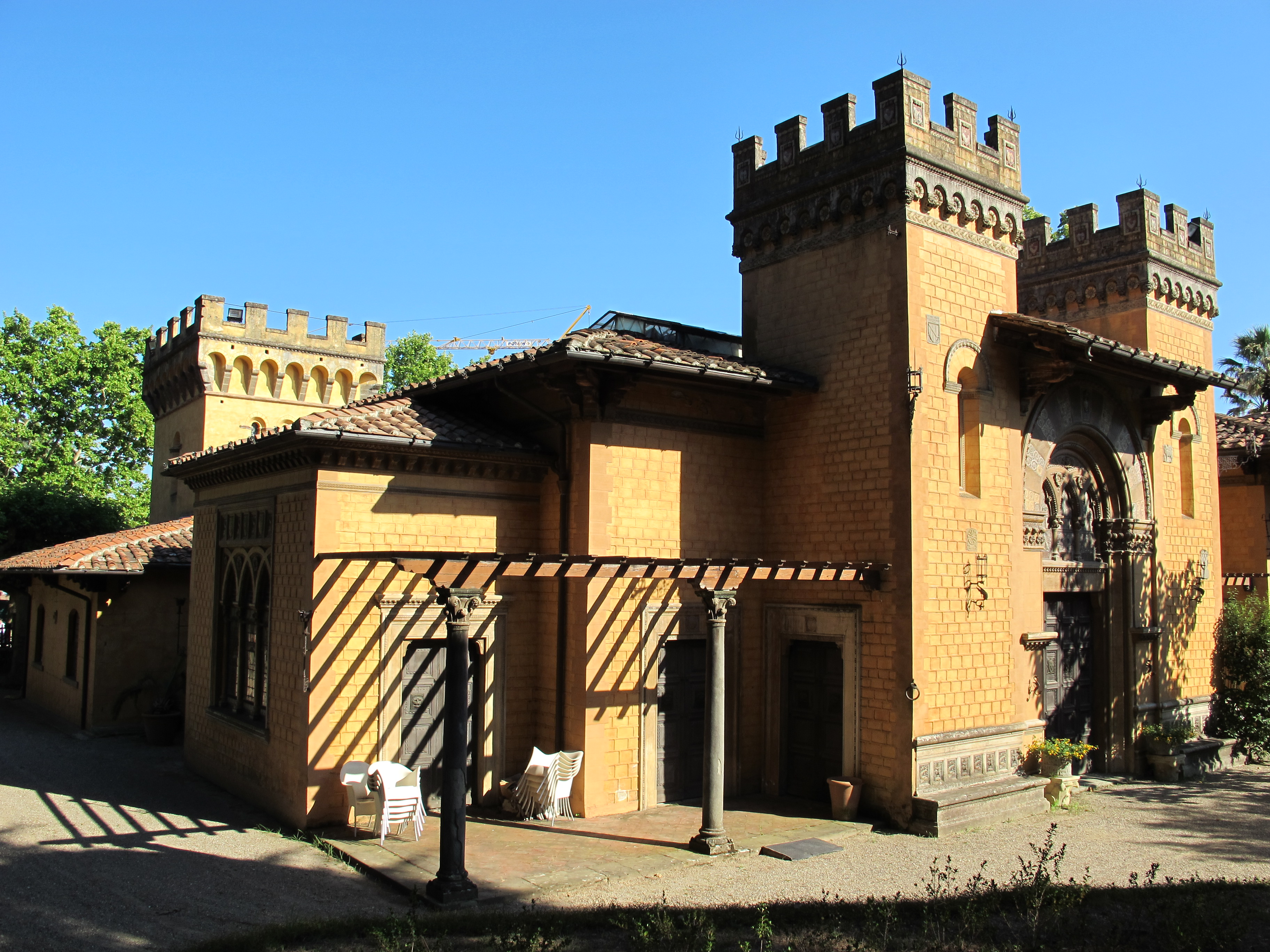
The Terme Tamerici

Montecatini-Terme is home to ten separate thermal water springs. The water from each spring is accessible from a series of buildings and estates that bear the name of the spring they house. These are:

- Terme Excelsior (1968). The first building, dedicated to hosting a Casino, was designed by Giulio Bernardini and was opened to the public on 27 June 1907. In 1968, the first structure was demolished and rebuilt to a design by Sergio Brusa Pasquè. The typical architecture of the loggia draws inspiration from the Florentine Renaissance.
- Terme La Fortuna (1910s). The La Fortuna spring was discovered in 1853. The 1912 building that houses it consists of a rectangular, single-floor structure as well as a crypt. The complex is located in a manicured garden.
- Terme La Salute (1929). The La Salute spring was discovered in 1860 in a travertine quarry. The establishment was rebuilt between 1922 and 1929 on a site of 7250 square meters.
- Terme Nuove Redi (2009). First opened in 1920, the establishment was completely rebuilt in 1964. In 2009 it was renovated by architect Oreste Ruggiero.
- Terme Regina (1927), located inside the Tettuccio park, opened in 1773. The current, newer complex was built between 1923 and 1927 in Neo-Renaissance style, to a design by Ugo Giovannozzi.
- Terme Rinfresco (1927), initially designed in 1795, and as of today closed to the public. The establishment was rebuilt in 1927 to a design by Ugo Giovannozzi. Of some interest is the freshwater stone mosaic of a florentine Fleur-De-Lis in front of the building.
- Terme Tamerici (1911), located in the center of the spa park and characterized by four distinct buildings. The Tamerici thermal spring was discovered in 1843 and the buildings that compose the establishment bearing its name were partially demolished in 1909 and rebuilt in 1911.
- Terme Tettuccio (1928), the largest of the city's thermal establishments, laid out in an open-air configuration. The first complex of pavilions, as well as part of the manicured garden they sit in, were designed by Gaspare Maria Paoletti between 1779 and 1781. In 1929, part of the Tettuccio estate was reworked drawing inspiration from the late Renaissance period.
- Terme Leopoldine (1926), named after Grand Duke Leopold II of Habsburg-Lorraine, first opened in 1775. The current complex dates back to the restoration carried out between 1919 and 1926. They currently remain closed to the general public.
- Terme Torretta (1928) take their name from the river that flows beneath them. Built from 1829 onwards by Count Baldino Baldini, the buildings underwent an important restoration operation between 1925 and 1928.

=== Other ===
- The Walk of Fame is an installation placed along the pavement of Viale Giuseppe Verdi. It consists of a series of circular studs which show the names of the main personalities who have visited Montecatini Terme.
A panoramic view of Montecatini Terme with Montecatini Alto.

== Notable people ==
- Pietro Grocco, doctor
- Sirio Maccioni, restaurateur of international fame
- Luca Cardelli, computer scientist
- Christian Dior died in a hotel at Montecatini.
- Massimo Stiavelli, astronomer

== Twin towns ==
- Harrogate, United Kingdom
- Concepción, Paraguay
- Locarno, Switzerland, since 1964 (Philately twinning)
