= Pietro Grocco =

Italian physician (1856–1916)

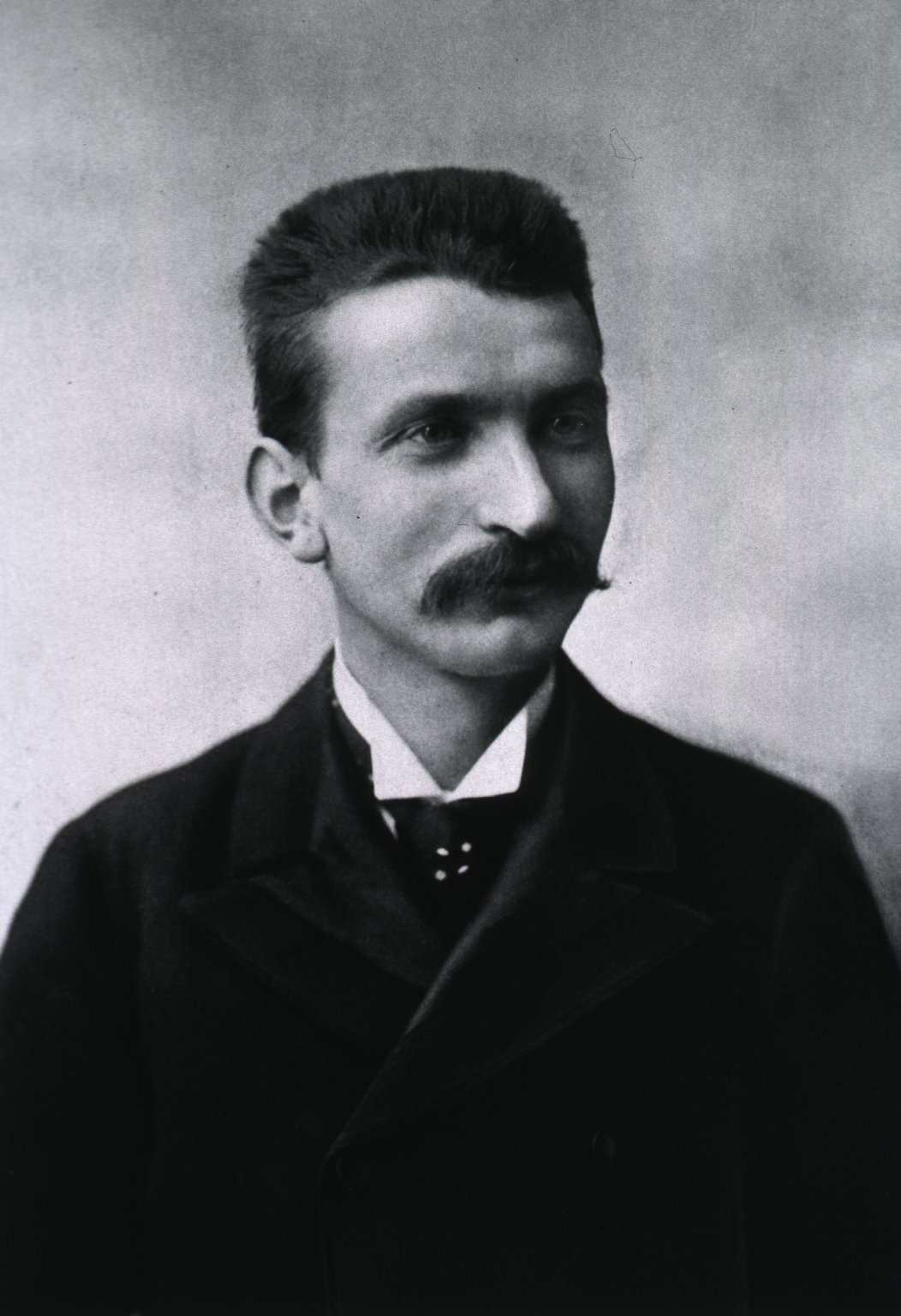
Pietro Grocco (1856-1926)

Pietro Grocco (27 June 1856, Albonese - 12 February 1916, Courmayeur) was an Italian physician.

== Background ==
In 1879, Grocco received his medical doctorate from the University of Pavia, afterwards continuing his education in Paris and Vienna. In 1884, he was appointed director of special pathology at the University of Perugia, followed by an appointment as chair of clinical medicine at Pisa (1888).

From 1892, Grocco served as a professor in Florence, where among his many accomplishments, he founded a rabies institute. In 1892 he was also named government inspector and medical director of the baths at Montecatini.

== Grocco's Triangle ==
In 1902 he described "Grocco's triangle", a triangular area of paravertebral dullness on the side opposite a pleural effusion. His name is also associated with "Grocco's sign", defined as acute dilatation of the heart following a muscle effort.

== Selected writings ==
- Triangolo paravertebrale opposto nella pleurite essudativa. Lavori dei congressi di medicina interna, Rome, 1902, 12 (1903): 190. - Grocco's triangle described.
- Lezioni di clinica medica. Milan, 1905 - Lessons of clinical medicine.
