= Brisighella =

Coordinates: 44°13′21″N 11°46′27″E

- Comune
- Comune di Brisighella
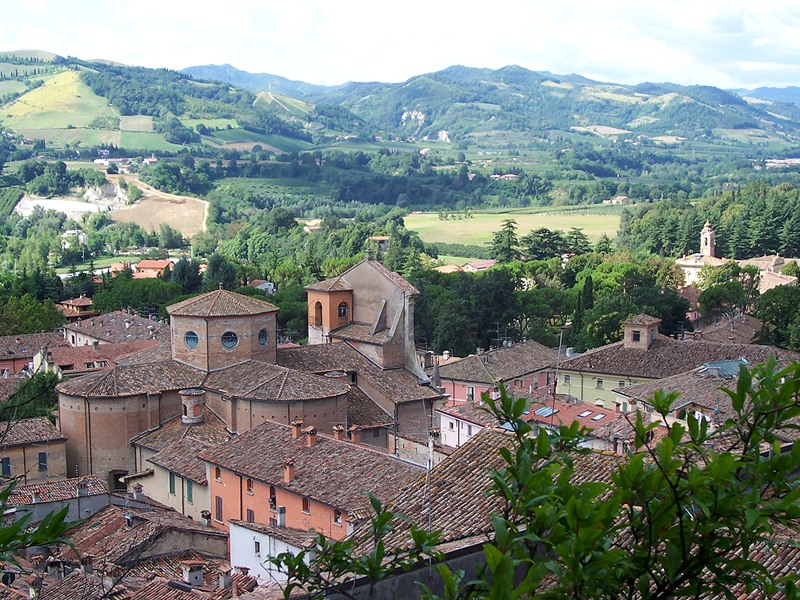
- Panorama of Brisighella

- Coat of arms

- Location within Italy Location within Emilia-Romagna
- Country: Italy
- Region: Emilia-Romagna
- Province: Ravenna (RA)
- Frazioni: Boesimo, Casale, Castellina, Croce Daniele, Fognano, Fornazzano, La Strada, Marzeno, Monteromano, Pietramora, Purocielo, Rontana, San Cassiano, San Martino in Gattara, Urbiano, Villa San Giorgio in Vezzano, Zattaglia

Government
  - Mayor: Massimiliano Pederzoli

Area
  - Total: 194.33 km^{2} (75.03 sq mi)
- Elevation: 115 m (377 ft)

Population (30 April 2017)
  - Total: 7,598
  - Density: 39.10/km^{2} (101.3/sq mi)
- Demonym: Brisighellesi
- Time zone: UTC+1 (CET)
  - Summer (DST): UTC+2 (CEST)
- Postal code: 48013
- Dialing code: 0546
- Website: Official website

Brisighella (Romagnol: Brisighëla) is a comune (municipality) in the province of Ravenna, region of Emilia-Romagna, in Northeast Italy. It is one of I Borghi più belli d'Italia ("The most beautiful villages of Italy").

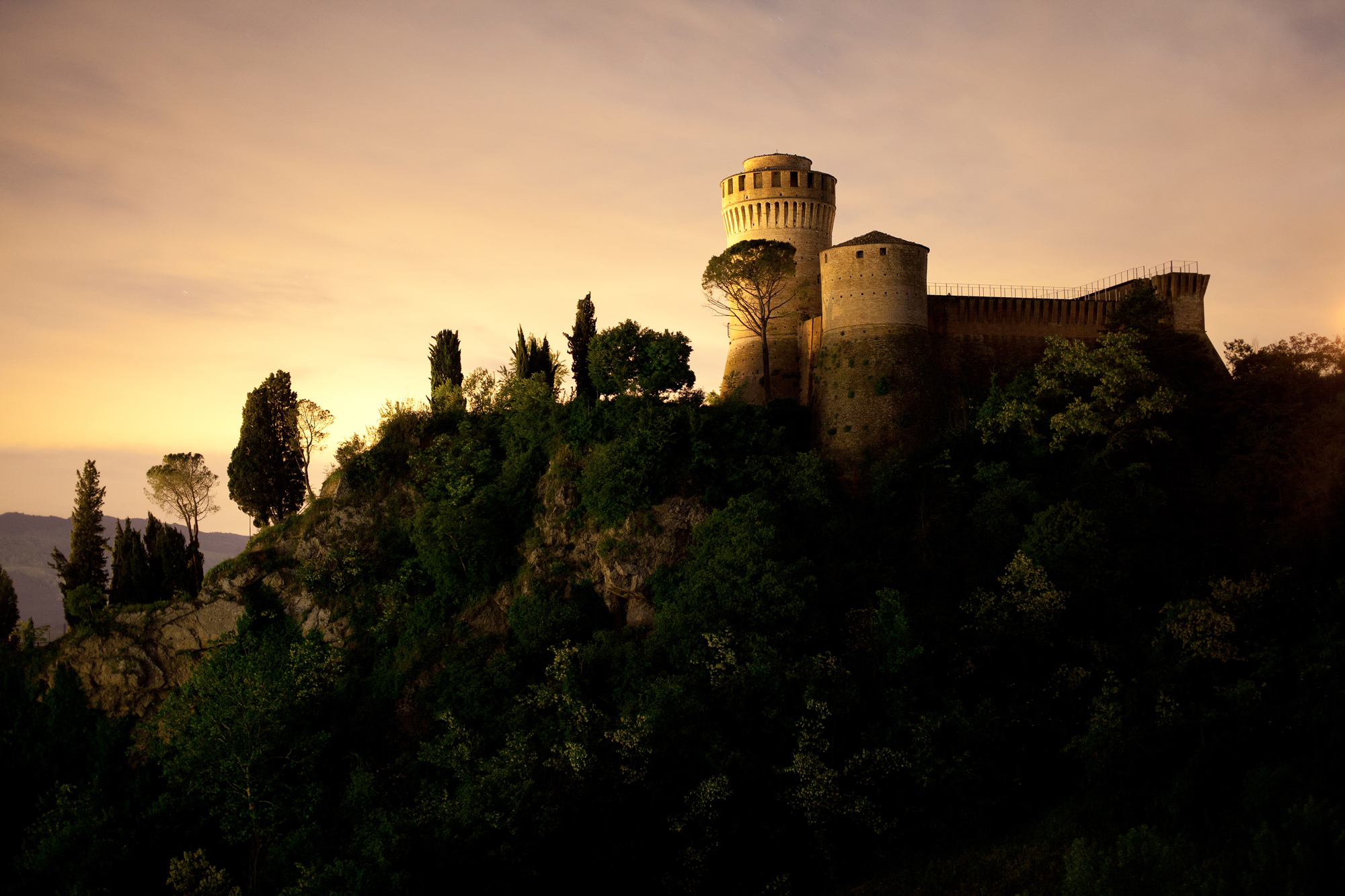
Rocca Manfrediana di Brisighella, Emilia-Romagna

Brisighella borders the following municipalities: Casola Valsenio, Castrocaro Terme e Terra del Sole, Faenza, Forlì, Marradi, Modigliana, Palazzuolo sul Senio, Riolo Terme. It originates from a rocca castle ordered by Maghinardo Pagani and later expanded by Francesco Manfredi, lord of Faenza.

It is the birthplace of Dino Monduzzi (1922–2006), a cardinal of the Roman Catholic Church.

The final part of the novel The Gadfly by Ethel Lilian Voynich (1897) is set in Brisighella. This historical novel, now neglected in England or in the US, almost unknown in Italy, was popular in the second half of the 20th century, on the basis of a Marxist reconsideration of its plot, in the USSR, Communist countries in Eastern Europe, Mao Zedong's China, etc.

Brisighella is a member of Cittaslow.

== Main sights ==
- Via del Borgo or Via degli Asini ("Donkeys' Road"), an elevated road mostly covered by arches of different types.
- Church of the Osservanza (1520). Its interior houses a Madonna with Child and Saints painted by Marco Palmezzano
- Pieve (rural church) of San Giovanni in Ottavo (11th century)
- Rocca (castle), built in 1228. It has several cylindrical towers, the tallest of which was added in 1503.
- Sanctuary of Monticino (18th century)
- Torre dell'Orologio ("Clock Tower"), rebuilt in the 19th century above a pre-existing defensive structure.

== Notable people ==
- Domenico Barduzzi (1847–1929), dermatologist and hydrologist
