= List of administrative communes =

This list of administrative communes consists of articles about the governmental divisions known as communes, as well as lists of communes.

== Algeria ==
- Under the French the baladiyahs, the third level of administrative division, were called communes, see List of municipalities of Algeria

== Angola ==
- Communes of Angola, the third level administrative division

== Argentina ==
- Communes of Argentina

== Burkina Faso ==
- Departments of Burkina Faso (also known as communes), the lowest level of administrative division

== Burundi ==
- Communes of Burundi

== Cambodia ==
- Communes of Cambodia, third-level administrative division

== Cameroon ==
- Communes of Cameroon, third-level administrative division

== Chad ==
- Communes of Chad

== Chile ==
- Communes of Chile, the third and lowest level administrative division of the country, comprising cities, towns, villages, hamlets, and unsettled areas

== People's Republic of China ==
- People's commune, an administrative division of the rural area in the People's Republic of China between 1958–1984

== Denmark ==
- List of municipalities of Denmark, in Danish: kommuner (sing.: kommune). Kommuner were introduced in the Danish constitution in 1849 in order to administer aid to the poor, provide education and later on to handle tax collection. The system has been revised many times throughout history, most recently in 2007, where the number of kommuner was reduced from 270 to 98.

== Democratic Republic of Congo ==
- Communes of Kinshasa

== Finland ==
- List of municipalities of Finland (Finnish: kunta; Swedish: kommun)

== France ==
- Communes of France, the lowest level of administrative division, comprising cities, towns, and villages
  - Lists of communes of France

== Germany ==
- Communes of Germany

== Haiti ==
- Arrondissements of Haiti, below districts
- List of communes of Haiti, the lowest level of administrative division

== Italy ==
- Comune, equivalent to a municipality
  - List of communes of the Province of Agrigento
  - List of communes of the Province of Alessandria
  - List of communes of the Province of Ancona
  - List of communes of the Province of Arezzo
  - List of communes of the Province of Ascoli Piceno
  - List of communes of the Province of Asti
  - List of communes of the Province of Avellino
  - List of communes of the Province of Bari
  - List of communes of the Province of Belluno
  - List of communes of the Province of Bergamo
  - List of communes of the Province of Benevento
  - List of communes of the Province of Biella
  - List of communes of the Province of Bologna
  - List of communes of the Province of Brescia
  - List of communes of the Province of Brindisi
  - List of communes of the Province of Cagliari
  - List of communes of the Province of Caltanissetta
  - List of communes of the Province of Campobasso
  - List of communes of the Province of Carbonia-Iglesias
  - List of communes of the Province of Caserta
  - List of communes of the Province of Catania
  - List of communes of the Province of Catanzaro
  - List of communes of the Province of Chieti
  - List of communes of the Province of Como
  - List of communes of the Province of Cosenza
  - List of communes of the Province of Cremona
  - List of communes of the Province of Crotone
  - List of communes of the Province of Cuneo
  - List of communes of the Province of Enna
  - List of communes of the Province of Fermo
  - List of communes of the Province of Ferrara
  - List of communes of the Province of Florence
  - List of communes of the Province of Foggia
  - List of communes of the Province of Forlì-Cesena
  - List of communes of the Province of Frosinone
  - List of communes of the Province of Genoa
  - List of communes of the Province of Gorizia
  - List of communes of the Province of Grosseto
  - List of communes of the Province of Imperia
  - List of communes of the Province of Isernia
  - List of communes of the Province of L'Aquila
  - List of communes of the Province of La Spezia
  - List of communes of the Province of Latina
  - List of communes of the Province of Lecce
  - List of communes of the Province of Lecco
  - List of communes of the Province of Livorno
  - List of communes of the Province of Lodi
  - List of communes of the Province of Lucca
  - List of communes of the Province of Macerata
  - List of communes of the Province of Mantua
  - Comuni of the Province of Massa-Carrara
  - List of communes of the Province of Matera
  - List of communes of the Province of Medio Campidano
  - List of communes of the Province of Messina
  - List of communes of the Province of Milan
  - List of communes of the Province of Modena
  - Comuni of the Province of Monza and of Brianza
  - List of communes of the Province of Naples
  - List of communes of the Province of Novara
  - List of communes of the Province of Nuoro
  - List of communes of the Province of Ogliastra
  - List of communes of the Province of Olbia-Tempio
  - List of communes of the Province of Oristano
  - List of communes of the Province of Padua
  - List of communes of the Province of Palermo
  - List of communes of the Province of Parma
  - List of communes of the Province of Pavia
  - List of communes of the Province of Perugia
  - List of communes of the Province of Pesaro e Urbino
  - List of communes of the Province of Pescara
  - List of communes of the Province of Piacenza
  - List of communes of the Province of Pisa
  - List of communes of the Province of Pistoia
  - List of communes of the Province of Pordenone
  - List of communes of the Province of Potenza
  - Comuni of the Province of Prato
  - List of communes of the Province of Ragusa
  - List of communes of the Province of Ravenna
  - List of communes of the Province of Reggio Calabria
  - List of communes of the Province of Reggio Emilia
  - List of communes of the Province of Rieti
  - List of communes of the Province of Rimini
  - List of communes of the Province of Rome
  - List of communes of the Province of Rovigo
  - List of communes of the Province of Salerno
  - List of communes of the Province of Sassari
  - List of communes of the Province of Savona
  - List of communes of the Province of Siena
  - List of communes of the Province of Sondrio
  - Municipalities of South Tyrol
  - List of communes of the Province of Syracuse
  - List of communes of the Province of Taranto
  - List of communes of the Province of Teramo
  - List of communes of the Province of Terni
  - List of communes of the Province of Treviso
  - List of communes of the Province of Trieste
  - List of communes of the Province of Trapani
  - Communes of Trentino
  - List of communes of the Province of Turin
  - List of communes of the Province of Udine
  - List of communes of the Province of Varese
  - List of communes of the Province of Venice
  - List of communes of the Province of Verbano-Cusio-Ossola
  - List of communes of the Province of Vercelli (very incomplete)
  - List of communes of the Province of Verona
  - List of communes of the Province of Vibo Valentia
  - List of communes of the Province of Vicenza
  - List of communes of the Province of Viterbo

== Luxembourg ==
- Communes of Luxembourg, the lowest uniform level of administrative division
  - List of communes of Luxembourg
    - List of communes of Luxembourg by population
    - List of communes of Luxembourg by population density
    - List of communes of Luxembourg by area
    - List of communes of Luxembourg in different languages
    - List of communes of Luxembourg by lowest point

== Mali ==
- Communes of Mali, the third level of administrative division

== Moldova ==
- List of localities in Moldova, which includes communes

== Niger ==
- Communes of Niger, the third level of administrative division

== Norway ==
- List of municipalities of Norway (kommuner)

== Poland ==
- Gmina, the lowest uniform level of administrative division
  - List of Polish gminas

== Romania ==
- Communes of Romania, comprising villages

== Senegal ==
- Communes of Senegal

== Sweden ==
- Municipalities of Sweden (kommun), the lowest level administrative division of the country, comprising cities, towns, villages, hamlets, and unsettled areas
  - List of municipalities of Sweden

== Switzerland ==
- Municipalities of Switzerland, called communes in French

== Tunisia ==
- List of cities in Tunisia

== Vietnam ==
- Communes of Vietnam
