= List of municipalities of Tuscany =

Location of Tuscany within Italy

Provinces of Tuscany

The following is a list of the municipalities (comuni) of the region of Tuscany in Italy.

There are 273 municipalities in Tuscany as of 2026:

- 36 in the Province of Arezzo
- 41 in the Metropolitan City of Florence
- 28 in the Province of Grosseto
- 19 in the Province of Livorno
- 33 in the Province of Lucca
- 17 in the Province of Massa-Carrara
- 37 in the Province of Pisa
- 20 in the Province of Pistoia
- 7 in the Province of Prato
- 35 in the Province of Siena

== List ==
Municipality	Province	Population (2026)	Area (km²)	Density
Abbadia San Salvatore	Siena	6,117	58.99	103.7
Abetone Cutigliano	Pistoia	1,834	74.94	24.5
Agliana	Pistoia	17,984	11.68	1,539.7
Altopascio	Lucca	16,186	28.58	566.3
Anghiari	Arezzo	5,343	130.92	40.8
Arcidosso	Grosseto	4,341	93.26	46.5
Arezzo	Arezzo	96,506	384.70	250.9
Asciano	Siena	6,782	215.64	31.5
Aulla	Massa-Carrara	10,915	59.99	181.9
Badia Tedalda	Arezzo	941	118.72	7.9
Bagni di Lucca	Lucca	5,476	164.71	33.2
Bagno a Ripoli	Florence	24,806	74.10	334.8
Bagnone	Massa-Carrara	1,686	73.94	22.8
Barberino di Mugello	Florence	10,981	133.29	82.4
Barberino Tavarnelle	Florence	11,983	123.01	97.4
Barga	Lucca	9,293	66.47	139.8
Bibbiena	Arezzo	11,971	86.51	138.4
Bibbona	Livorno	3,172	65.68	48.3
Bientina	Pisa	8,681	29.48	294.5
Borgo a Mozzano	Lucca	6,683	72.20	92.6
Borgo San Lorenzo	Florence	18,412	146.37	125.8
Bucine	Arezzo	9,906	131.47	75.3
Buggiano	Pistoia	8,738	16.04	544.8
Buonconvento	Siena	2,936	64.84	45.3
Buti	Pisa	5,532	23.03	240.2
Calci	Pisa	6,263	25.17	248.8
Calcinaia	Pisa	12,824	14.89	861.2
Calenzano	Florence	18,008	76.97	234.0
Camaiore	Lucca	31,763	85.43	371.8
Campagnatico	Grosseto	2,345	162.25	14.5
Campi Bisenzio	Florence	47,435	28.75	1,649.9
Campiglia Marittima	Livorno	12,235	83.28	146.9
Campo nell'Elba	Livorno	4,629	55.79	83.0
Camporgiano	Lucca	1,982	27.09	73.2
Cantagallo	Prato	3,088	95.67	32.3
Capalbio	Grosseto	3,660	187.36	19.5
Capannoli	Pisa	6,339	22.69	279.4
Capannori	Lucca	46,739	155.96	299.7
Capoliveri	Livorno	3,970	39.56	100.4
Capolona	Arezzo	5,203	47.56	109.4
Capraia e Limite	Florence	7,804	24.92	313.2
Capraia Isola	Livorno	347	19.33	18.0
Caprese Michelangelo	Arezzo	1,325	66.53	19.9
Careggine	Lucca	487	24.08	20.2
Carmignano	Prato	14,500	38.43	377.3
Carrara	Massa-Carrara	59,723	71.01	841.1
Casale Marittimo	Pisa	1,047	14.29	73.3
Casciana Terme Lari	Pisa	12,110	81.39	148.8
Cascina	Pisa	44,816	78.61	570.1
Casola in Lunigiana	Massa-Carrara	901	41.54	21.7
Casole d'Elsa	Siena	3,669	148.69	24.7
Castagneto Carducci	Livorno	8,639	142.33	60.7
Castel del Piano	Grosseto	4,803	67.77	70.9
Castel Focognano	Arezzo	2,931	56.63	51.8
Castel San Niccolò	Arezzo	2,493	83.27	29.9
Castelfiorentino	Florence	17,488	66.44	263.2
Castelfranco di Sotto	Pisa	13,752	48.33	284.5
Castelfranco Piandiscò	Arezzo	9,808	55.96	175.3
Castell'Azzara	Grosseto	1,254	64.23	19.5
Castellina in Chianti	Siena	2,591	99.80	26.0
Castellina Marittima	Pisa	1,948	45.52	42.8
Castelnuovo Berardenga	Siena	8,764	177.11	49.5
Castelnuovo di Garfagnana	Lucca	5,605	28.48	196.8
Castelnuovo di Val di Cecina	Pisa	2,055	89.02	23.1
Castiglion Fibocchi	Arezzo	2,122	25.46	83.3
Castiglion Fiorentino	Arezzo	12,823	111.58	114.9
Castiglione d'Orcia	Siena	2,046	141.66	14.4
Castiglione della Pescaia	Grosseto	7,056	209.28	33.7
Castiglione di Garfagnana	Lucca	1,685	48.53	34.7
Cavriglia	Arezzo	9,504	60.87	156.1
Cecina	Livorno	28,022	42.52	659.0
Cerreto Guidi	Florence	10,659	49.32	216.1
Certaldo	Florence	15,731	75.28	209.0
Cetona	Siena	2,441	53.57	45.6
Chianciano Terme	Siena	7,143	36.58	195.3
Chianni	Pisa	1,276	61.99	20.6
Chiesina Uzzanese	Pistoia	4,619	7.20	641.5
Chitignano	Arezzo	872	14.89	58.6
Chiusdino	Siena	1,704	141.62	12.0
Chiusi	Siena	8,052	58.15	138.5
Chiusi della Verna	Arezzo	1,892	102.33	18.5
Cinigiano	Grosseto	2,466	161.55	15.3
Civitella in Val di Chiana	Arezzo	8,608	100.19	85.9
Civitella Paganico	Grosseto	2,953	192.90	15.3
Colle di Val d'Elsa	Siena	21,665	92.06	235.3
Collesalvetti	Livorno	16,390	107.96	151.8
Comano	Massa-Carrara	636	53.83	11.8
Coreglia Antelminelli	Lucca	5,075	52.94	95.9
Cortona	Arezzo	20,725	342.97	60.4
Crespina Lorenzana	Pisa	5,339	46.43	115.0
Dicomano	Florence	5,610	61.63	91.0
Empoli	Florence	49,526	62.21	796.1
Fabbriche di Vergemoli	Lucca	695	42.55	16.3
Fauglia	Pisa	3,655	42.43	86.1
Fiesole	Florence	13,742	42.19	325.7
Figline e Incisa Valdarno	Florence	23,291	97.90	237.9
Filattiera	Massa-Carrara	2,147	48.78	44.0
Firenzuola	Florence	4,444	271.99	16.3
Fivizzano	Massa-Carrara	6,886	181.18	38.0
Florence	Florence	361,625	102.32	3,534.3
Foiano della Chiana	Arezzo	9,026	40.77	221.4
Follonica	Grosseto	20,000	56.02	357.0
Forte dei Marmi	Lucca	6,550	8.88	737.6
Fosciandora	Lucca	553	19.86	27.8
Fosdinovo	Massa-Carrara	4,580	48.63	94.2
Fucecchio	Florence	22,919	65.18	351.6
Gaiole in Chianti	Siena	2,460	128.89	19.1
Gallicano	Lucca	3,592	31.04	115.7
Gambassi Terme	Florence	4,872	83.15	58.6
Gavorrano	Grosseto	8,356	163.98	51.0
Greve in Chianti	Florence	13,365	169.38	78.9
Grosseto	Grosseto	81,275	473.55	171.6
Guardistallo	Pisa	1,201	23.61	50.9
Impruneta	Florence	14,186	48.72	291.2
Isola del Giglio	Grosseto	1,279	24.01	53.3
Lajatico	Pisa	1,252	72.66	17.2
Lamporecchio	Pistoia	7,360	22.25	330.8
Larciano	Pistoia	6,341	24.97	253.9
Lastra a Signa	Florence	19,880	42.90	463.4
Laterina Pergine Valdarno	Arezzo	6,291	70.57	89.1
Licciana Nardi	Massa-Carrara	4,706	55.68	84.5
Livorno	Livorno	152,451	104.50	1,458.9
Londa	Florence	1,848	59.29	31.2
Loro Ciuffenna	Arezzo	5,874	86.52	67.9
Lucca	Lucca	88,464	185.79	476.2
Lucignano	Arezzo	3,394	44.81	75.7
Magliano in Toscana	Grosseto	3,249	250.78	13.0
Manciano	Grosseto	6,850	372.51	18.4
Marciana	Livorno	2,049	45.45	45.1
Marciana Marina	Livorno	1,852	5.86	316.0
Marciano della Chiana	Arezzo	3,517	23.75	148.1
Marliana	Pistoia	3,353	43.04	77.9
Marradi	Florence	2,808	154.07	18.2
Massa	Massa-Carrara	65,547	93.84	698.5
Massa e Cozzile	Pistoia	7,752	16.01	484.2
Massa Marittima	Grosseto	8,197	283.45	28.9
Massarosa	Lucca	21,782	68.27	319.1
Minucciano	Lucca	1,713	57.28	29.9
Molazzana	Lucca	953	31.33	30.4
Monsummano Terme	Pistoia	20,863	32.62	639.6
Montaione	Florence	3,433	104.76	32.8
Montalcino	Siena	5,530	310.31	17.8
Montale	Pistoia	10,463	32.17	325.2
Monte Argentario	Grosseto	11,605	60.40	192.1
Monte San Savino	Arezzo	8,588	89.87	95.6
Montecarlo	Lucca	4,343	15.67	277.2
Montecatini Val di Cecina	Pisa	1,689	154.86	10.9
Montecatini-Terme	Pistoia	21,805	17.69	1,232.6
Montelupo Fiorentino	Florence	14,272	24.67	578.5
Montemignaio	Arezzo	495	25.94	19.1
Montemurlo	Prato	19,169	30.77	623.0
Montepulciano	Siena	13,017	165.33	78.7
Monterchi	Arezzo	1,719	29.42	58.4
Monteriggioni	Siena	10,063	99.72	100.9
Monteroni d'Arbia	Siena	9,019	105.91	85.2
Monterotondo Marittimo	Grosseto	1,274	102.59	12.4
Montescudaio	Pisa	2,192	20.24	108.3
Montespertoli	Florence	13,197	124.97	105.6
Montevarchi	Arezzo	24,044	56.67	424.3
Monteverdi Marittimo	Pisa	769	98.09	7.8
Monticiano	Siena	1,636	109.50	14.9
Montieri	Grosseto	1,189	108.21	11.0
Montignoso	Massa-Carrara	10,050	16.74	600.4
Montopoli in Val d'Arno	Pisa	11,261	30.22	372.6
Mulazzo	Massa-Carrara	2,269	62.51	36.3
Murlo	Siena	2,475	114.61	21.6
Orbetello	Grosseto	13,917	226.80	61.4
Orciano Pisano	Pisa	635	11.62	54.6
Ortignano Raggiolo	Arezzo	834	36.30	23.0
Palaia	Pisa	4,562	73.71	61.9
Palazzuolo sul Senio	Florence	1,095	109.11	10.0
Peccioli	Pisa	4,635	92.52	50.1
Pelago	Florence	7,966	54.56	146.0
Pescaglia	Lucca	3,154	70.55	44.7
Pescia	Pistoia	19,213	79.18	242.6
Piancastagnaio	Siena	3,839	69.63	55.1
Piazza al Serchio	Lucca	2,031	27.03	75.1
Pienza	Siena	1,900	122.96	15.5
Pietrasanta	Lucca	22,678	41.60	545.1
Pieve a Nievole	Pistoia	9,235	12.67	728.9
Pieve Fosciana	Lucca	2,184	28.76	75.9
Pieve Santo Stefano	Arezzo	2,966	156.10	19.0
Piombino	Livorno	32,374	129.88	249.3
Pisa	Pisa	90,146	185.18	486.8
Pistoia	Pistoia	89,094	236.17	377.2
Pitigliano	Grosseto	3,515	101.97	34.5
Podenzana	Massa-Carrara	2,153	17.10	125.9
Poggibonsi	Siena	28,048	70.59	397.3
Poggio a Caiano	Prato	9,908	6.00	1,651.3
Pomarance	Pisa	5,254	227.71	23.1
Ponsacco	Pisa	15,693	19.88	789.4
Pontassieve	Florence	20,122	114.40	175.9
Ponte Buggianese	Pistoia	8,893	29.53	301.2
Pontedera	Pisa	30,028	46.02	652.5
Pontremoli	Massa-Carrara	6,867	182.48	37.6
Poppi	Arezzo	5,732	97.09	59.0
Porcari	Lucca	8,908	18.05	493.5
Porto Azzurro	Livorno	3,687	13.33	276.6
Portoferraio	Livorno	11,748	48.48	242.3
Prato	Prato	198,327	97.35	2,037.3
Pratovecchio Stia	Arezzo	5,406	138.24	39.1
Quarrata	Pistoia	27,028	45.91	588.7
Radda in Chianti	Siena	1,431	80.42	17.8
Radicofani	Siena	1,024	118.10	8.7
Radicondoli	Siena	969	132.57	7.3
Rapolano Terme	Siena	5,103	83.04	61.5
Reggello	Florence	16,555	121.68	136.1
Rignano sull'Arno	Florence	8,511	54.14	157.2
Rio	Livorno	3,427	36.52	93.8
Riparbella	Pisa	1,692	58.84	28.8
Roccalbegna	Grosseto	909	124.86	7.3
Roccastrada	Grosseto	8,767	284.47	30.8
Rosignano Marittimo	Livorno	30,103	120.82	249.2
Rufina	Florence	7,103	45.88	154.8
Sambuca Pistoiese	Pistoia	1,406	77.25	18.2
San Casciano dei Bagni	Siena	1,417	92.14	15.4
San Casciano in Val di Pesa	Florence	16,288	107.83	151.1
San Gimignano	Siena	7,463	138.60	53.8
San Giovanni Valdarno	Arezzo	16,564	21.45	772.2
San Giuliano Terme	Pisa	30,867	91.77	336.4
San Godenzo	Florence	1,115	99.21	11.2
San Marcello Piteglio	Pistoia	7,410	134.96	54.9
San Miniato	Pisa	27,769	102.50	270.9
San Quirico d'Orcia	Siena	2,530	42.12	60.1
San Romano in Garfagnana	Lucca	1,295	26.16	49.5
San Vincenzo	Livorno	6,342	33.20	191.0
Sansepolcro	Arezzo	15,192	91.19	166.6
Santa Croce sull'Arno	Pisa	15,114	16.79	900.2
Santa Fiora	Grosseto	2,504	63.45	39.5
Santa Luce	Pisa	1,580	66.62	23.7
Santa Maria a Monte	Pisa	13,473	38.04	354.2
Sarteano	Siena	4,494	84.81	53.0
Sassetta	Livorno	554	26.75	20.7
Scandicci	Florence	49,135	59.70	823.0
Scansano	Grosseto	4,360	273.53	15.9
Scarlino	Grosseto	3,680	88.29	41.7
Scarperia	Florence	11,943	115.81	103.1
Seggiano	Grosseto	1,054	49.43	21.3
Semproniano	Grosseto	1,022	81.65	12.5
Seravezza	Lucca	12,284	39.55	310.6
Serravalle Pistoiese	Pistoia	11,830	42.05	281.3
Sestino	Arezzo	1,150	80.22	14.3
Sesto Fiorentino	Florence	49,237	48.80	1,009.0
Siena	Siena	53,180	118.53	448.7
Signa	Florence	18,990	18.81	1,009.6
Sillano Giuncugnano	Lucca	965	81.30	11.9
Sinalunga	Siena	12,093	78.66	153.7
Sorano	Grosseto	2,983	174.56	17.1
Sovicille	Siena	9,844	143.61	68.5
Stazzema	Lucca	2,783	80.08	34.8
Subbiano	Arezzo	6,405	77.84	82.3
Suvereto	Livorno	2,902	92.47	31.4
Talla	Arezzo	964	59.89	16.1
Terranuova Bracciolini	Arezzo	12,135	85.88	141.3
Terricciola	Pisa	4,373	43.28	101.0
Torrita di Siena	Siena	6,942	58.24	119.2
Trequanda	Siena	1,115	63.98	17.4
Tresana	Massa-Carrara	1,880	44.45	42.3
Uzzano	Pistoia	5,646	7.80	723.8
Vagli Sotto	Lucca	761	41.22	18.5
Vaglia	Florence	5,371	56.94	94.3
Vaiano	Prato	9,965	34.11	292.1
Vecchiano	Pisa	11,822	67.58	174.9
Vernio	Prato	6,195	63.38	97.7
Viareggio	Lucca	60,680	32.42	1,871.7
Vicchio	Florence	8,164	138.86	58.8
Vicopisano	Pisa	8,582	26.85	319.6
Villa Basilica	Lucca	1,460	36.57	39.9
Villa Collemandina	Lucca	1,155	34.79	33.2
Villafranca in Lunigiana	Massa-Carrara	4,801	29.32	163.7
Vinci	Florence	14,574	54.19	268.9
Volterra	Pisa	9,362	252.85	37.0
Zeri	Massa-Carrara	890	73.66	12.1

== See also ==
- List of municipalities of Italy
