= Communal President =

The Presidente comunal (in Spanish) or Communal President (in English) is the highest executive post for some locations in Argentina, mainly rural areas, called communes. It is equivalent to the title of Mayor. Some provinces with communes are Córdoba, Chubut, Santa Fe and Tucumán.

The term does not apply to other structures also known as communes, this generally referring to entities that are small in size. The top executive post in such areas is not designated President but as Mayor (maire in the French or Luxembourg communes).

== See also ==
- List of administrative communes
- Lists of communes of France
- List of communes of Luxembourg
- Communes of Senegal
- Communes of Argentina
