= List of municipalities of the Province of Lucca =

This is a list of the 33 municipalities (comuni) of the Province of Lucca in the region of Tuscany in Italy.

== List ==
Municipality	Population (2026)	Area (km²)	Density
Altopascio	16,186	28.58	566.3
Bagni di Lucca	5,476	164.71	33.2
Barga	9,293	66.47	139.8
Borgo a Mozzano	6,683	72.20	92.6
Camaiore	31,763	85.43	371.8
Camporgiano	1,982	27.09	73.2
Capannori	46,739	155.96	299.7
Careggine	487	24.08	20.2
Castelnuovo di Garfagnana	5,605	28.48	196.8
Castiglione di Garfagnana	1,685	48.53	34.7
Coreglia Antelminelli	5,075	52.94	95.9
Fabbriche di Vergemoli	695	42.55	16.3
Forte dei Marmi	6,550	8.88	737.6
Fosciandora	553	19.86	27.8
Gallicano	3,592	31.04	115.7
Lucca	88,464	185.79	476.2
Massarosa	21,782	68.27	319.1
Minucciano	1,713	57.28	29.9
Molazzana	953	31.33	30.4
Montecarlo	4,343	15.67	277.2
Pescaglia	3,154	70.55	44.7
Piazza al Serchio	2,031	27.03	75.1
Pietrasanta	22,678	41.60	545.1
Pieve Fosciana	2,184	28.76	75.9
Porcari	8,908	18.05	493.5
San Romano in Garfagnana	1,295	26.16	49.5
Seravezza	12,284	39.55	310.6
Sillano Giuncugnano	965	81.30	11.9
Stazzema	2,783	80.08	34.8
Vagli Sotto	761	41.22	18.5
Viareggio	60,680	32.42	1,871.7
Villa Basilica	1,460	36.57	39.9
Villa Collemandina	1,155	34.79	33.2

== See also ==
- List of municipalities of Tuscany
- List of municipalities of Italy
- Province of Lucca topics
