= List of municipalities of the Province of Barletta-Andria-Trani =

The following is a list of the 10 municipalities (comuni) of the Province of Barletta-Andria-Trani in the region of Apulia in Italy.

The capitals of the province are in bold.

== List ==
Municipality	Population (2026)	Area (km²)	Density	Map
**Andria**	**96,520**	**402.89**	**239.6**	
**Barletta**	**92,067**	**149.35**	**616.5**	
Bisceglie	53,242	69.25	768.8	
Canosa di Puglia	27,275	150.93	180.7	
Margherita di Savoia	11,025	35.70	308.8	
Minervino Murge	7,811	257.41	30.3	
San Ferdinando di Puglia	13,855	41.23	336.0	
Spinazzola	5,794	184.01	31.5	
**Trani**	**54,731**	**103.41**	**529.3**	
Trinitapoli	13,613	148.77	91.5	

== See also ==
- List of municipalities of Apulia
- List of municipalities of Italy
