= List of municipalities of the Province of Massa-Carrara =

The following is a list of the 17 municipalities (comuni) of the Province of Massa-Carrara in the region of Tuscany in Italy.

== List ==
Municipality	Population (2026)	Area (km²)	Density
Aulla	10,915	59.99	181.9
Bagnone	1,686	73.94	22.8
Carrara	59,723	71.01	841.1
Casola in Lunigiana	901	41.54	21.7
Comano	636	53.83	11.8
Filattiera	2,147	48.78	44.0
Fivizzano	6,886	181.18	38.0
Fosdinovo	4,580	48.63	94.2
Licciana Nardi	4,706	55.68	84.5
Massa	65,547	93.84	698.5
Montignoso	10,050	16.74	600.4
Mulazzo	2,269	62.51	36.3
Podenzana	2,153	17.10	125.9
Pontremoli	6,867	182.48	37.6
Tresana	1,880	44.45	42.3
Villafranca in Lunigiana	4,801	29.32	163.7
Zeri	890	73.66	12.1

== See also ==
- List of municipalities of Tuscany
- List of municipalities of Italy
