= List of municipalities of the Province of Pisa =

The following is a list of the 37 municipalities (comuni) of the Province of Pisa in the region of Tuscany in Italy.

== List ==
Municipality	Population (2026)	Area (km²)	Density
Bientina	8,681	29.48	294.5
Buti	5,532	23.03	240.2
Calci	6,263	25.17	248.8
Calcinaia	12,824	14.89	861.2
Capannoli	6,339	22.69	279.4
Casale Marittimo	1,047	14.29	73.3
Casciana Terme Lari	12,110	81.39	148.8
Cascina	44,816	78.61	570.1
Castelfranco di Sotto	13,752	48.33	284.5
Castellina Marittima	1,948	45.52	42.8
Castelnuovo di Val di Cecina	2,055	89.02	23.1
Chianni	1,276	61.99	20.6
Crespina Lorenzana	5,339	46.43	115.0
Fauglia	3,655	42.43	86.1
Guardistallo	1,201	23.61	50.9
Lajatico	1,252	72.66	17.2
Montecatini Val di Cecina	1,689	154.86	10.9
Montescudaio	2,192	20.24	108.3
Monteverdi Marittimo	769	98.09	7.8
Montopoli in Val d'Arno	11,261	30.22	372.6
Orciano Pisano	635	11.62	54.6
Palaia	4,562	73.71	61.9
Peccioli	4,635	92.52	50.1
Pisa	90,146	185.18	486.8
Pomarance	5,254	227.71	23.1
Ponsacco	15,693	19.88	789.4
Pontedera	30,028	46.02	652.5
Riparbella	1,692	58.84	28.8
San Giuliano Terme	30,867	91.77	336.4
San Miniato	27,769	102.50	270.9
Santa Croce sull'Arno	15,114	16.79	900.2
Santa Luce	1,580	66.62	23.7
Santa Maria a Monte	13,473	38.04	354.2
Terricciola	4,373	43.28	101.0
Vecchiano	11,822	67.58	174.9
Vicopisano	8,582	26.85	319.6
Volterra	9,362	252.85	37.0

== See also ==
- List of municipalities of Tuscany
- List of municipalities of Italy
