= List of municipalities of the Province of Prato =

The following is a list of the 7 municipalities (comuni) of the Province of Prato in the region of Tuscany in Italy.

== List ==
Municipality	Population (2026)	Area (km²)	Density	Location
Cantagallo	3,088	95.67	32.3	
Carmignano	14,500	38.43	377.3	
Montemurlo	19,169	30.77	623.0	
Poggio a Caiano	9,908	6.00	1,651.3	
Prato	198,327	97.35	2,037.3	
Vaiano	9,965	34.11	292.1	
Vernio	6,195	63.38	97.7	

== See also ==
- List of municipalities of Tuscany
- List of municipalities of Italy
