= List of municipalities of the Province of Ferrara =

The following is a list of the 21 municipalities (comuni) of the Province of Ferrara in the region of Emilia-Romagna in Italy.

== List ==
Municipality	Population (2026)	Area (km²)	Density
Argenta	21,295	311.67	68.3
Bondeno	14,179	174.76	81.1
Cento	35,836	64.74	553.5
Codigoro	10,932	170.01	64.3
Comacchio	22,003	284.13	77.4
Copparo	15,657	157.01	99.7
Ferrara	129,048	405.16	318.5
Fiscaglia	8,563	116.19	73.7
Goro	3,353	33.18	101.1
Jolanda di Savoia	2,595	108.34	24.0
Lagosanto	4,658	34.44	135.2
Masi Torello	2,241	22.71	98.7
Mesola	6,315	84.31	74.9
Ostellato	5,609	173.34	32.4
Poggio Renatico	9,720	80.23	121.2
Portomaggiore	12,433	126.64	98.2
Riva del Po	7,401	111.84	66.2
Terre del Reno	10,457	51.04	204.9
Tresignana	6,956	43.05	161.6
Vigarano Mainarda	7,637	42.02	181.7
Voghiera	3,594	40.33	89.1

== See also ==
- List of municipalities of Emilia-Romagna
- List of municipalities of Italy
