= List of municipalities of the Province of Macerata =

The following is a list of the 55 municipalities (comuni) of the Province of Macerata in the region of Marche in Italy.

== List ==
Municipality	Population (2026)	Area (km^{2})	Density
Apiro	2,015	53.78	37.5
Appignano	4,119	22.67	181.7
Belforte del Chienti	1,829	16.05	114.0
Bolognola	148	25.87	5.7
Caldarola	1,621	29.22	55.5
Camerino	5,935	129.88	45.7
Camporotondo di Fiastrone	461	8.81	52.3
Castelraimondo	4,180	44.85	93.2
Castelsantangelo sul Nera	207	70.67	2.9
Cessapalombo	409	27.58	14.8
Cingoli	9,438	148.20	63.7
Civitanova Marche	41,929	46.07	910.1
Colmurano	1,121	11.20	100.1
Corridonia	14,684	61.97	237.0
Esanatoglia	1,877	47.91	39.2
Fiastra	600	84.48	7.1
Fiuminata	1,194	76.22	15.7
Gagliole	513	24.05	21.3
Gualdo	700	22.22	31.5
Loro Piceno	2,155	32.58	66.1
Macerata	40,689	92.53	439.7
Matelica	9,026	81.10	111.3
Mogliano	4,245	29.26	145.1
Monte Cavallo	100	38.51	2.6
Monte San Giusto	7,411	20.04	369.8
Monte San Martino	668	18.47	36.2
Montecassiano	6,694	33.36	200.7
Montecosaro	7,370	21.88	336.8
Montefano	3,304	33.94	97.3
Montelupone	3,380	32.67	103.5
Morrovalle	9,773	42.58	229.5
Muccia	786	25.91	30.3
Penna San Giovanni	901	28.08	32.1
Petriolo	1,821	15.65	116.4
Pieve Torina	1,204	74.80	16.1
Pioraco	915	19.45	47.0
Poggio San Vicino	195	13.03	15.0
Pollenza	6,149	39.55	155.5
Porto Recanati	12,734	17.25	738.2
Potenza Picena	15,470	48.55	318.6
Recanati	20,558	103.46	198.7
Ripe San Ginesio	797	10.17	78.4
San Ginesio	3,047	78.02	39.1
San Severino Marche	11,793	194.26	60.7
Sant'Angelo in Pontano	1,219	27.38	44.5
Sarnano	3,058	63.17	48.4
Sefro	425	42.54	10.0
Serrapetrona	848	37.65	22.5
Serravalle di Chienti	1,035	95.99	10.8
Tolentino	17,439	95.12	183.3
Treia	9,002	93.54	96.2
Urbisaglia	2,363	22.86	103.4
Ussita	332	55.30	6.0
Valfornace	883	48.62	18.2
Visso	920	100.40	9.2

== See also ==
- List of municipalities of Marche
- List of municipalities of Italy
