= List of municipalities of Italy =

Administrative divisions of Italy as of November 2018

In Italy, municipalities (comuni) are the basic administrative division, and may be properly approximated in casual speech by the English word township or municipality.

== Overall ==
- Alphabetical list of municipalities of Italy

== Central Italy ==
=== Lazio ===
- List of municipalities of the Province of Frosinone
- List of municipalities of the Province of Latina
- List of municipalities of the Province of Rieti
- List of municipalities of the Metropolitan City of Capital Rome
- List of municipalities of the Province of Viterbo

=== Marche ===
- List of municipalities of the Province of Ancona
- List of municipalities of the Province of Ascoli Piceno
- List of municipalities of the Province of Fermo
- List of municipalities of the Province of Macerata
- List of municipalities of the Province of Pesaro and Urbino

=== Tuscany ===
- List of municipalities of the Province of Arezzo
- List of municipalities of the Metropolitan City of Florence
- List of municipalities of the Province of Grosseto
- List of municipalities of the Province of Livorno
- List of municipalities of the Province of Lucca
- List of municipalities of the Province of Massa-Carrara
- List of municipalities of the Province of Pisa
- List of municipalities of the Province of Pistoia
- List of municipalities of the Province of Prato
- List of municipalities of the Province of Siena

=== Umbria ===
- List of municipalities of the Province of Perugia
- List of municipalities of the Province of Terni

== Insular Italy ==
=== Sardinia ===
- List of municipalities of the Metropolitan City of Cagliari
- List of municipalities of the Province of Carbonia-Iglesias (former)
- List of municipalities of the Province of Medio Campidano (former)
- List of municipalities of the Province of Nuoro
- List of municipalities of the Province of Ogliastra (former)
- List of municipalities of the Province of Olbia-Tempio (former)
- List of municipalities of the Province of Oristano
- List of municipalities of the Province of Sassari
- List of municipalities of the Province of South Sardinia

=== Sicily ===
- List of municipalities of the Province of Agrigento
- List of municipalities of the Province of Caltanissetta
- List of municipalities of the Metropolitan City of Catania
- List of municipalities of the Province of Enna
- List of municipalities of the Metropolitan City of Messina
- List of municipalities of the Metropolitan City of Palermo
- List of municipalities of the Province of Ragusa
- List of municipalities of the Province of Syracuse
- List of municipalities of the Province of Trapani

== North Eastern Italy ==
=== Emilia-Romagna ===
- List of municipalities of the Metropolitan City of Bologna
- List of municipalities of the Province of Ferrara
- List of municipalities of the Province of Forlì-Cesena
- List of municipalities of the Province of Modena
- List of municipalities of the Province of Parma
- List of municipalities of the Province of Piacenza
- List of municipalities of the Province of Ravenna
- List of municipalities of the Province of Reggio Emilia
- List of municipalities of the Province of Rimini

=== Friuli-Venezia Giulia ===
- List of municipalities of the Province of Gorizia
- List of municipalities of the Province of Pordenone
- List of municipalities of the Province of Trieste
- List of municipalities of the Province of Udine

=== Trentino-Alto Adige/Südtirol ===
- List of municipalities of the Province of South Tyrol
- List of municipalities of the Province of Trentino

=== Veneto ===
- List of municipalities of the Province of Belluno
- List of municipalities of the Province of Padua
- List of municipalities of the Province of Rovigo
- List of municipalities of the Province of Treviso
- List of municipalities of the Metropolitan City of Venice
- List of municipalities of the Province of Verona
- List of municipalities of the Province of Vicenza

== North Western Italy ==
=== Aosta Valley ===
- List of municipalities of the Aosta Valley

=== Liguria ===
- List of municipalities of the Metropolitan City of Genoa
- List of municipalities of the Province of Imperia
- List of municipalities of the Province of La Spezia
- List of municipalities of the Province of Savona

=== Lombardy ===
- List of municipalities of the Province of Bergamo
- List of municipalities of the Province of Brescia
- List of municipalities of the Province of Como
- List of municipalities of the Province of Cremona
- List of municipalities of the Province of Lecco
- List of municipalities of the Province of Lodi
- List of municipalities of the Province of Mantua
- List of municipalities of the Metropolitan City of Milan
- List of municipalities of the Province of Monza and Brianza
- List of municipalities of the Province of Pavia
- List of municipalities of the Province of Sondrio
- List of municipalities of the Province of Varese

=== Piedmont ===
- List of municipalities of the Province of Alessandria
- List of municipalities of the Province of Asti
- List of municipalities of the Province of Biella
- List of municipalities of the Province of Cuneo
- List of municipalities of the Province of Novara
- List of municipalities of the Metropolitan City of Turin
- List of municipalities of the Province of Verbano-Cusio-Ossola
- List of municipalities of the Province of Vercelli

== Southern Italy ==
=== Abruzzo ===
- List of municipalities of the Province of Chieti
- List of municipalities of the Province of L'Aquila
- List of municipalities of the Province of Pescara
- List of municipalities of the Province of Teramo

=== Apulia ===
- List of municipalities of the Metropolitan City of Bari
- List of municipalities of the Province of Barletta-Andria-Trani
- List of municipalities of the Province of Brindisi
- List of municipalities of the Province of Foggia
- List of municipalities of the Province of Lecce
- List of municipalities of the Province of Taranto

=== Basilicata ===
- List of municipalities of the Province of Matera
- List of municipalities of the Province of Potenza

=== Calabria ===
- List of municipalities of the Province of Catanzaro
- List of municipalities of the Province of Cosenza
- List of municipalities of the Province of Crotone
- List of municipalities of the Metropolitan City of Reggio Calabria
- List of municipalities of the Province of Vibo Valentia

=== Campania ===
- List of municipalities of the Province of Avellino
- List of municipalities of the Province of Benevento
- List of municipalities of the Province of Caserta
- List of municipalities of the Metropolitan City of Naples
- List of municipalities of the Province of Salerno

=== Molise ===
- List of municipalities of the Province of Campobasso
- List of municipalities of the Province of Isernia
