= List of municipalities of the Province of Pescara =

The following is a list of the 46 municipalities (comuni) of the Province of Pescara in the region of Abruzzo in Italy.

== List ==
| Municipality | Population (2026) | Area (km²) | Density |
|---|---|---|---|
| Abbateggio | 345 | 15.40 | 22.4 |
| Alanno | 3,262 | 32.53 | 100.3 |
| Bolognano | 1,003 | 16.96 | 59.1 |
| Brittoli | 236 | 15.99 | 14.8 |
| Bussi sul Tirino | 2,188 | 25.91 | 84.4 |
| Cappelle sul Tavo | 4,106 | 5.41 | 759.0 |
| Caramanico Terme | 1,703 | 84.99 | 20.0 |
| Carpineto della Nora | 498 | 24.08 | 20.7 |
| Castiglione a Casauria | 723 | 16.57 | 43.6 |
| Catignano | 1,232 | 17.03 | 72.3 |
| Cepagatti | 11,030 | 30.82 | 357.9 |
| Città Sant'Angelo | 14,935 | 62.02 | 240.8 |
| Civitaquana | 1,156 | 21.88 | 52.8 |
| Civitella Casanova | 1,505 | 31.10 | 48.4 |
| Collecorvino | 6,065 | 31.99 | 189.6 |
| Corvara | 186 | 13.73 | 13.5 |
| Cugnoli | 1,324 | 15.96 | 83.0 |
| Elice | 1,615 | 14.31 | 112.9 |
| Farindola | 1,293 | 45.47 | 28.4 |
| Lettomanoppello | 2,603 | 15.07 | 172.7 |
| Loreto Aprutino | 7,037 | 59.50 | 118.3 |
| Manoppello | 6,762 | 39.26 | 172.2 |
| Montebello di Bertona | 803 | 21.50 | 37.3 |
| Montesilvano | 53,557 | 23.57 | 2,272.3 |
| Moscufo | 3,166 | 20.26 | 156.3 |
| Nocciano | 1,684 | 13.76 | 122.4 |
| Penne | 10,906 | 91.20 | 119.6 |
| Pescara | 118,487 | 34.36 | 3,448.4 |
| Pescosansonesco | 439 | 18.35 | 23.9 |
| Pianella | 8,563 | 47.05 | 182.0 |
| Picciano | 1,278 | 7.56 | 169.0 |
| Pietranico | 416 | 14.77 | 28.2 |
| Popoli | 4,574 | 35.04 | 130.5 |
| Roccamorice | 840 | 25.06 | 33.5 |
| Rosciano | 4,114 | 27.79 | 148.0 |
| Salle | 250 | 21.80 | 11.5 |
| San Valentino in Abruzzo Citeriore | 1,788 | 16.40 | 109.0 |
| Sant'Eufemia a Maiella | 233 | 40.42 | 5.8 |
| Scafa | 3,388 | 10.34 | 327.7 |
| Serramonacesca | 493 | 23.89 | 20.6 |
| Spoltore | 18,924 | 37.01 | 511.3 |
| Tocco da Casauria | 2,325 | 29.67 | 78.4 |
| Torre de' Passeri | 2,862 | 5.92 | 483.4 |
| Turrivalignani | 785 | 6.11 | 128.5 |
| Vicoli | 357 | 9.33 | 38.3 |
| Villa Celiera | 524 | 13.18 | 39.8 |

== See also ==
- List of municipalities of Abruzzo
- List of municipalities of Italy
