= List of municipalities of the Province of Perugia =

The following is a list of the 59 municipalities (comuni) of the Province of Perugia in the region of Umbria in Italy.

== List ==
Municipality	Population (2026)	Area (km²)	Density
Assisi	27,400	187.19	146.4
Bastia Umbra	21,497	27.60	778.9
Bettona	4,247	45.08	94.2
Bevagna	4,736	56.22	84.2
Campello sul Clitunno	2,311	49.76	46.4
Cannara	4,169	32.81	127.1
Cascia	2,930	180.85	16.2
Castel Ritaldi	2,994	22.44	133.4
Castiglione del Lago	15,202	205.26	74.1
Cerreto di Spoleto	961	74.78	12.9
Citerna	3,383	23.53	143.8
Città della Pieve	7,377	110.94	66.5
Città di Castello	37,847	387.32	97.7
Collazzone	3,284	55.68	59.0
Corciano	21,603	63.72	339.0
Costacciaro	1,020	41.06	24.8
Deruta	9,562	44.51	214.8
Foligno	55,262	264.67	208.8
Fossato di Vico	2,585	35.39	73.0
Fratta Todina	1,913	17.43	109.8
Giano dell'Umbria	3,669	44.48	82.5
Gualdo Cattaneo	5,628	96.63	58.2
Gualdo Tadino	14,133	124.29	113.7
Gubbio	30,190	525.78	57.4
Lisciano Niccone	602	35.18	17.1
Magione	14,662	129.73	113.0
Marsciano	17,962	161.49	111.2
Massa Martana	3,553	78.41	45.3
Monte Castello di Vibio	1,378	31.95	43.1
Monte Santa Maria Tiberina	1,045	72.53	14.4
Montefalco	5,266	69.51	75.8
Monteleone di Spoleto	535	62.18	8.6
Montone	1,534	51.10	30.0
Nocera Umbra	5,474	157.17	34.8
Norcia	4,399	275.58	16.0
Paciano	923	16.91	54.6
Panicale	5,317	79.26	67.1
Passignano sul Trasimeno	5,686	81.33	69.9
Perugia	162,384	449.51	361.2
Piegaro	3,321	99.18	33.5
Pietralunga	2,010	140.42	14.3
Poggiodomo	81	40.09	2.0
Preci	678	82.03	8.3
San Giustino	11,020	79.98	137.8
Sant'Anatolia di Narco	490	46.55	10.5
Scheggia e Pascelupo	1,231	64.16	19.2
Scheggino	422	35.85	11.8
Sellano	918	85.85	10.7
Sigillo	2,282	26.48	86.2
Spello	8,208	61.65	133.1
Spoleto	35,875	348.14	103.0
Todi	15,432	222.86	69.2
Torgiano	6,628	37.66	176.0
Trevi	7,969	71.19	111.9
Tuoro sul Trasimeno	3,793	55.89	67.9
Umbertide	16,207	200.83	80.7
Valfabbrica	3,225	92.30	34.9
Vallo di Nera	317	36.22	8.8
Valtopina	1,258	40.57	31.0

== Gallery ==
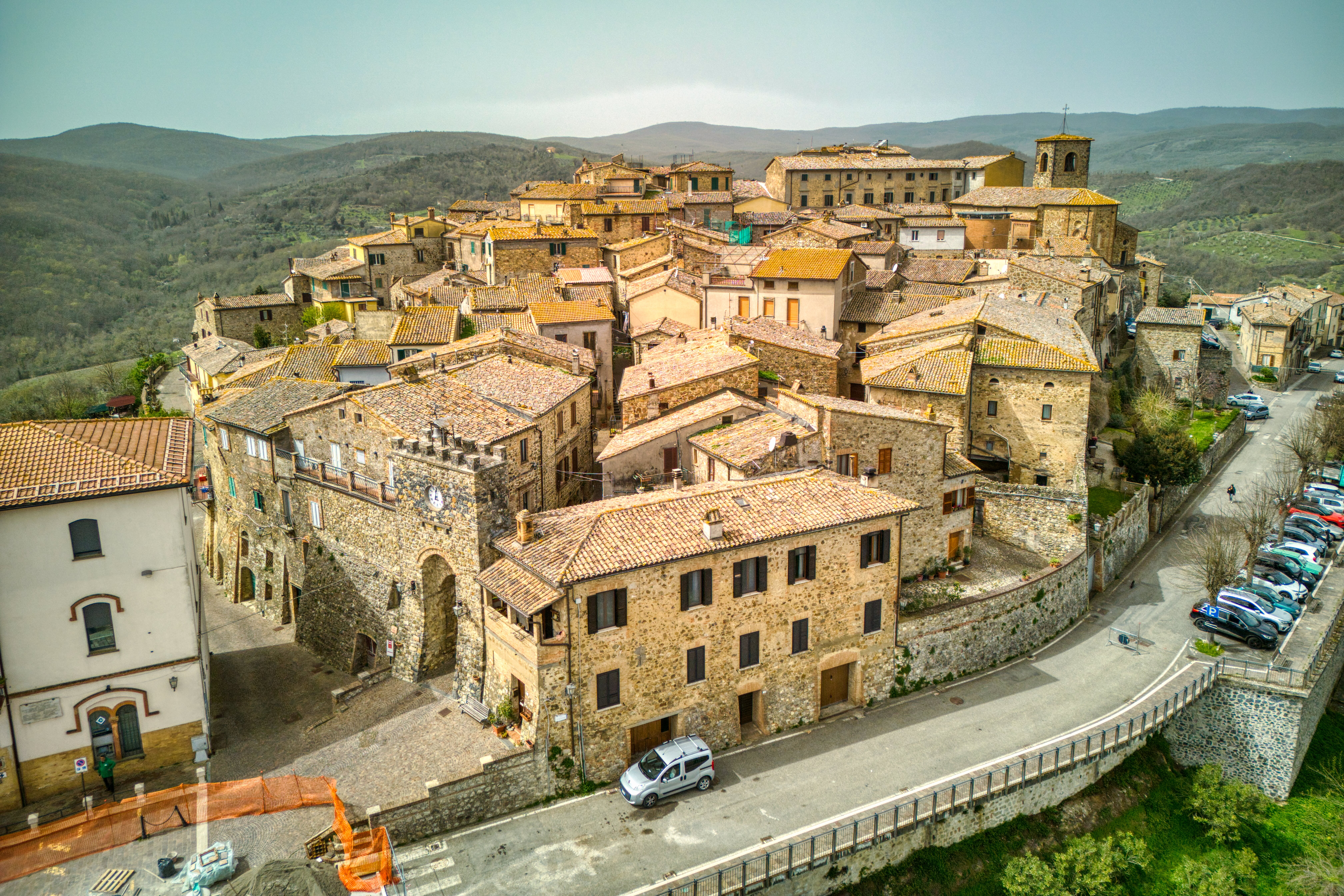
Allerona

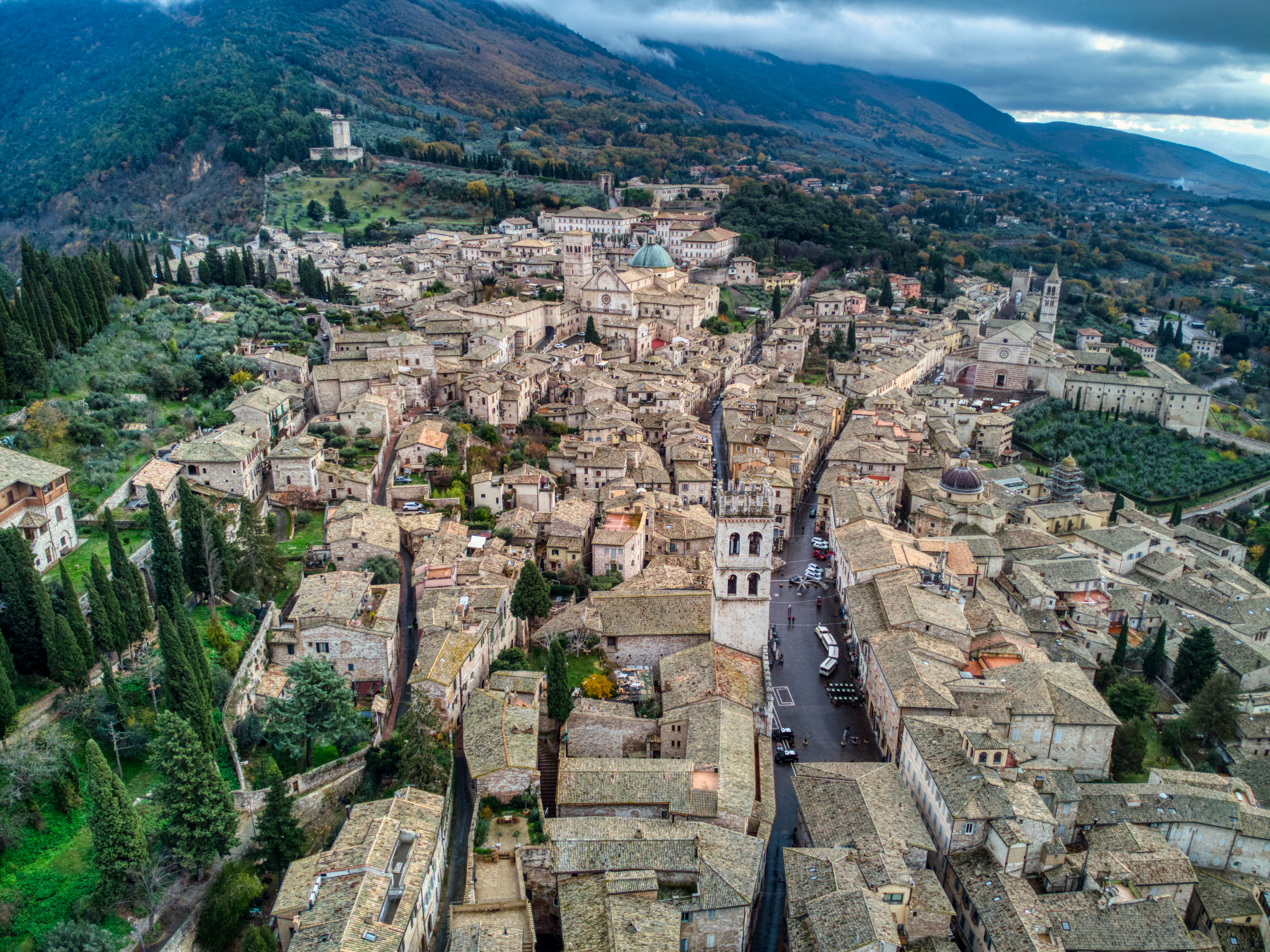
Assisi

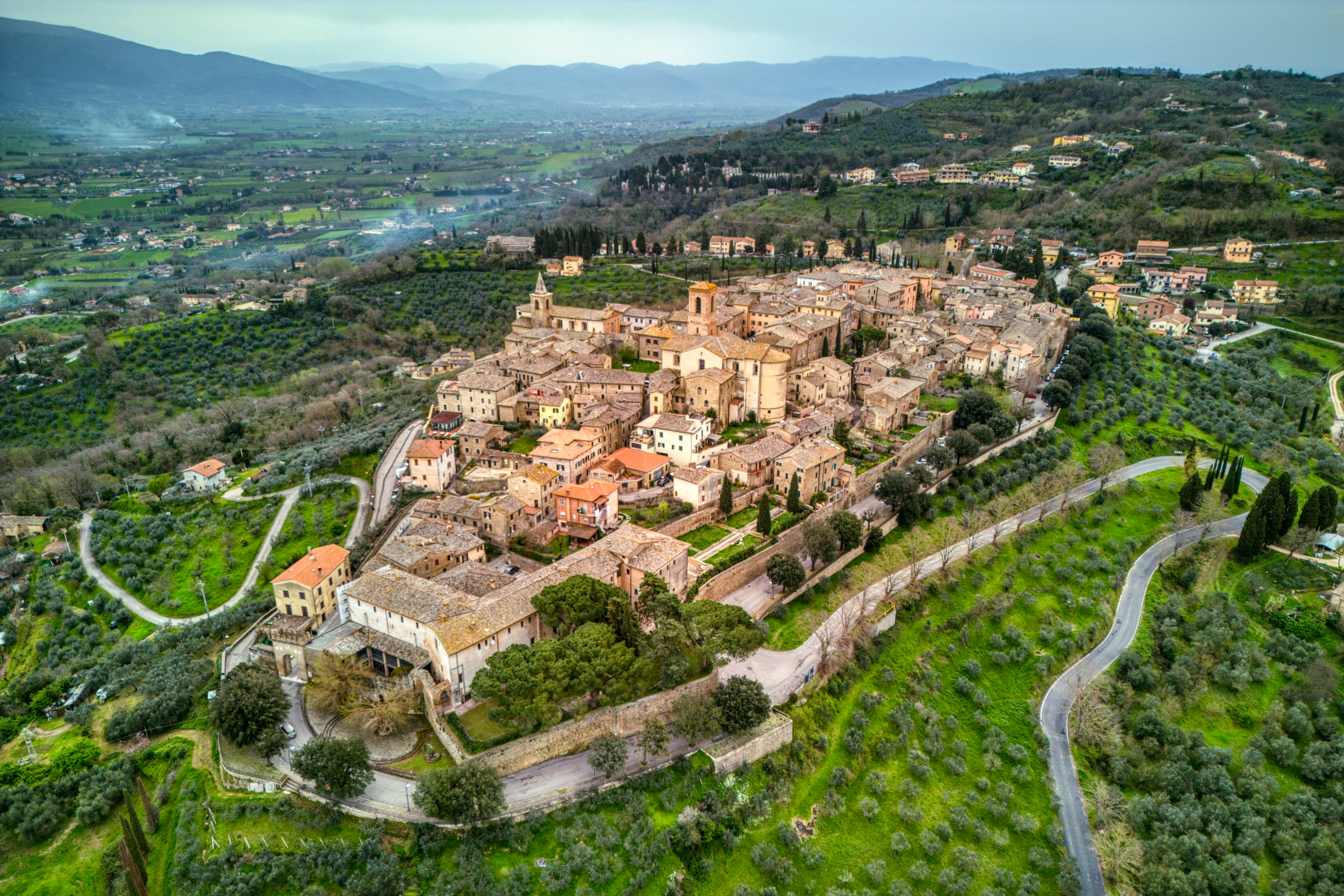
Bettona

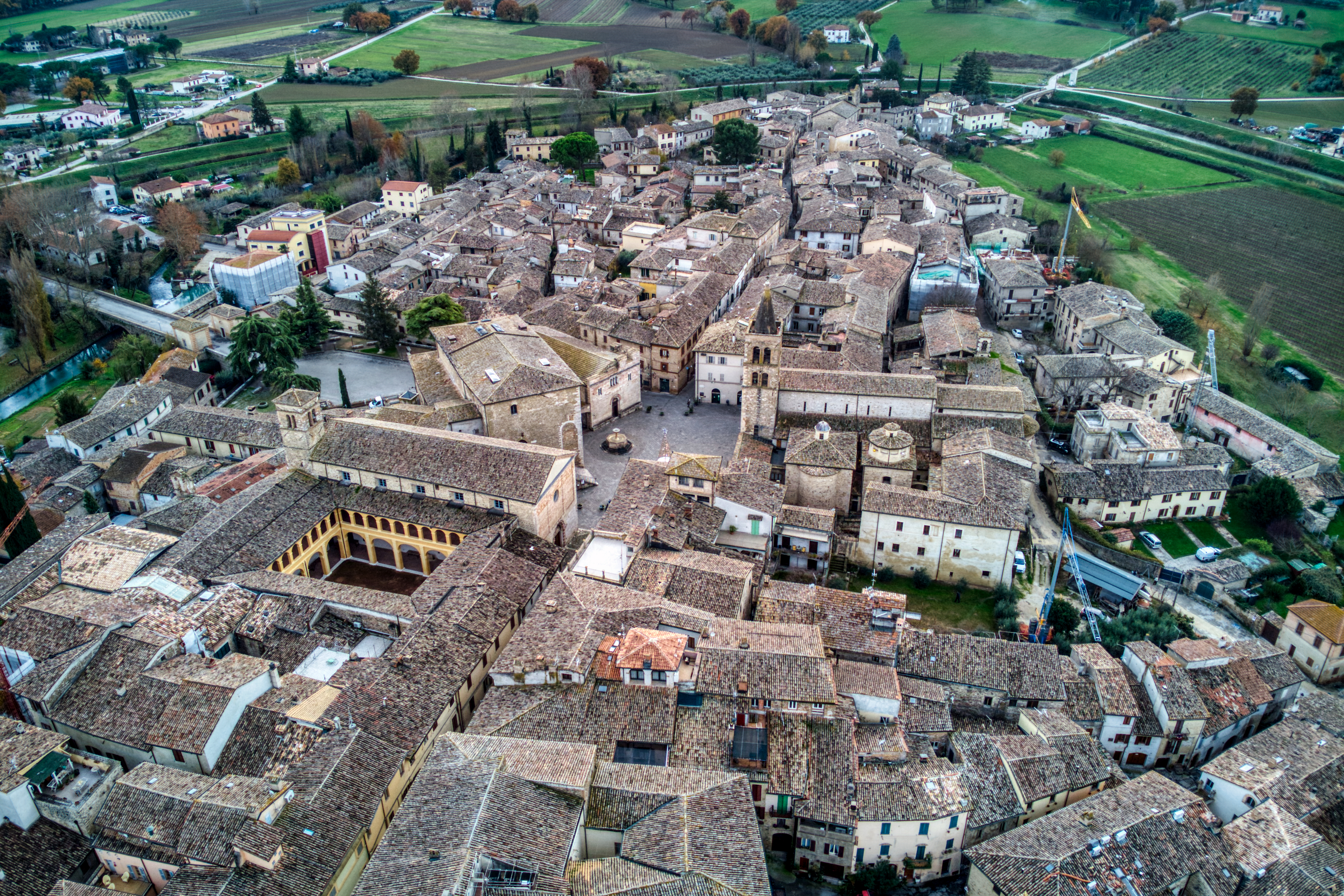
Bevagna

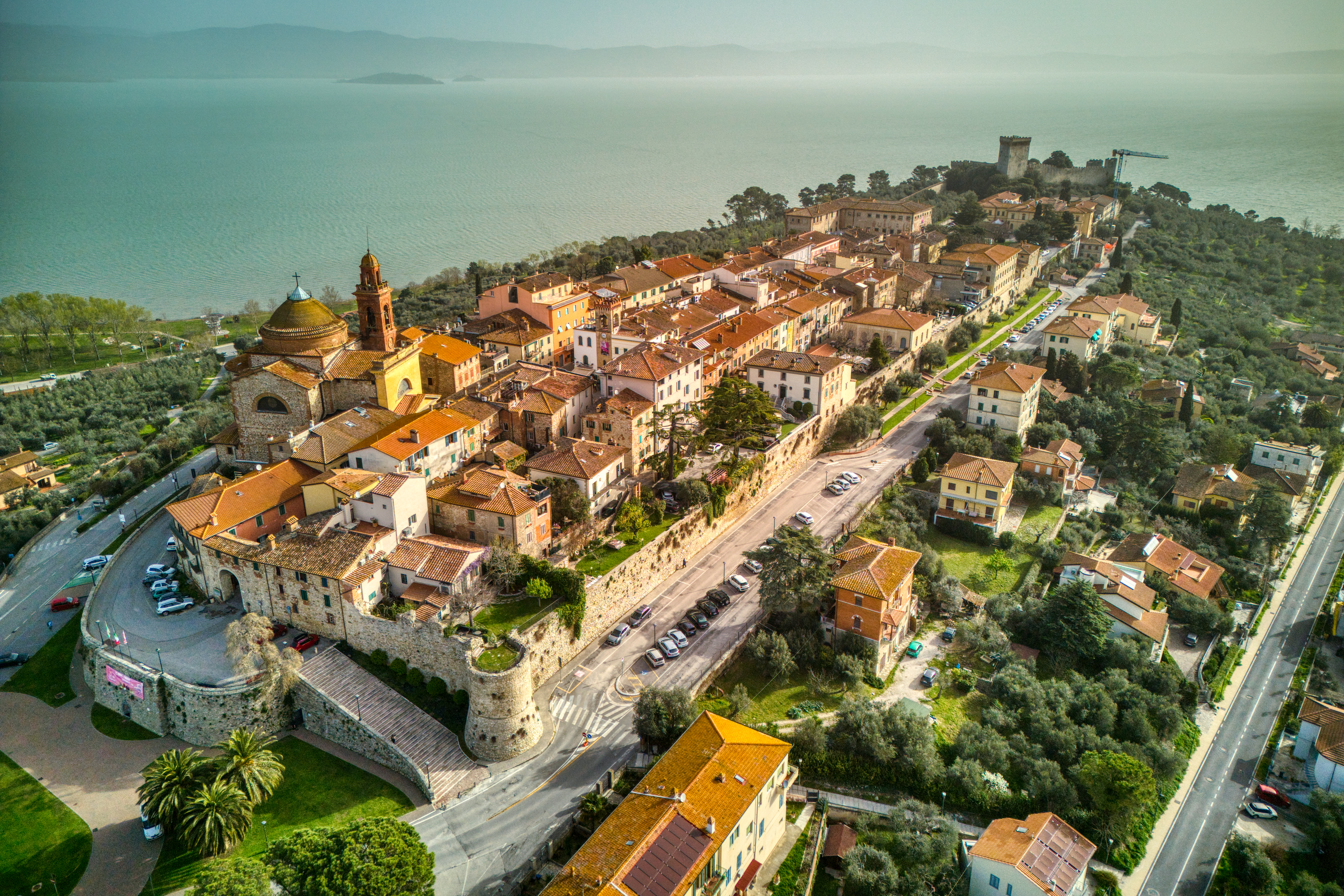
Castiglione del Lago

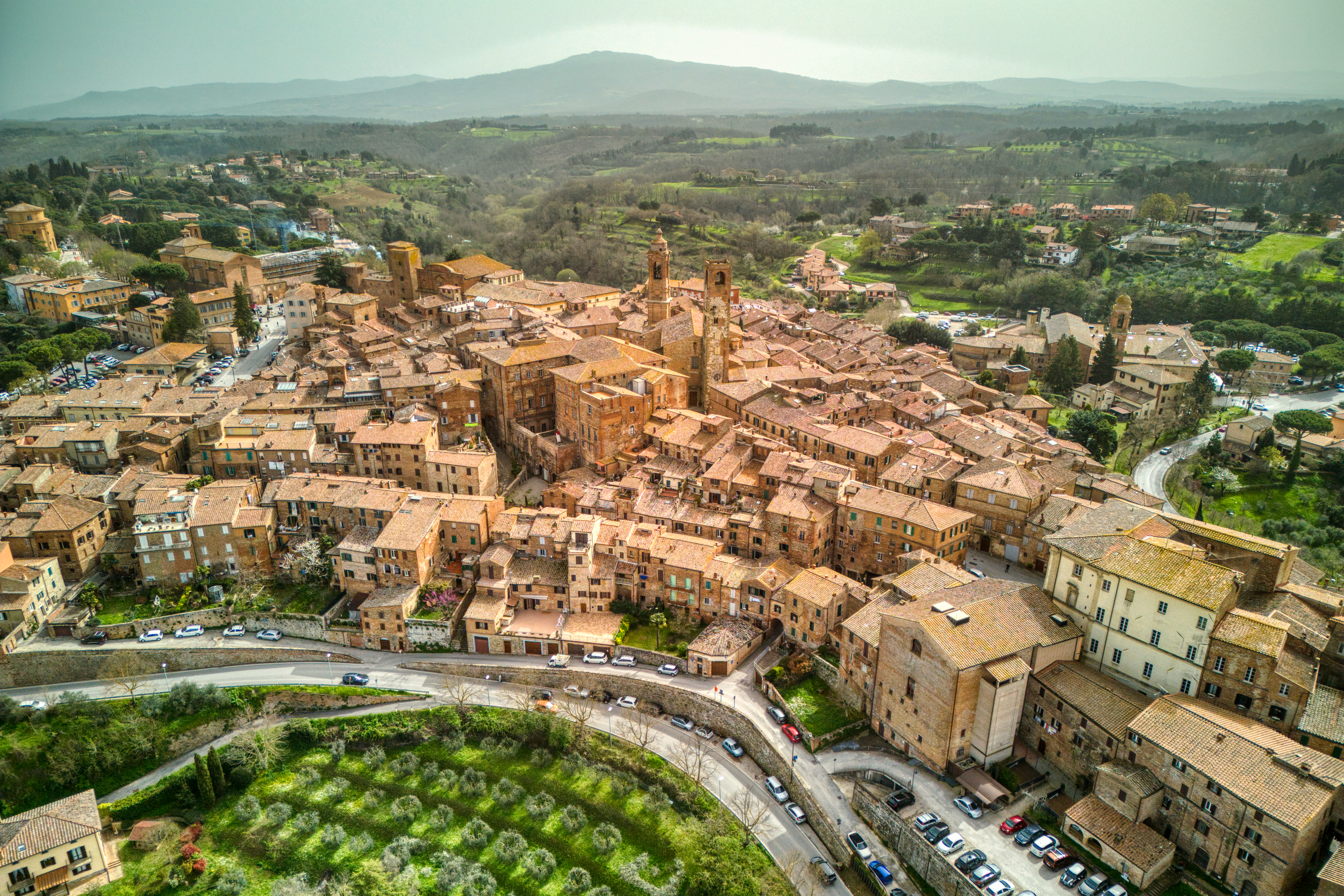
Città della Pieve

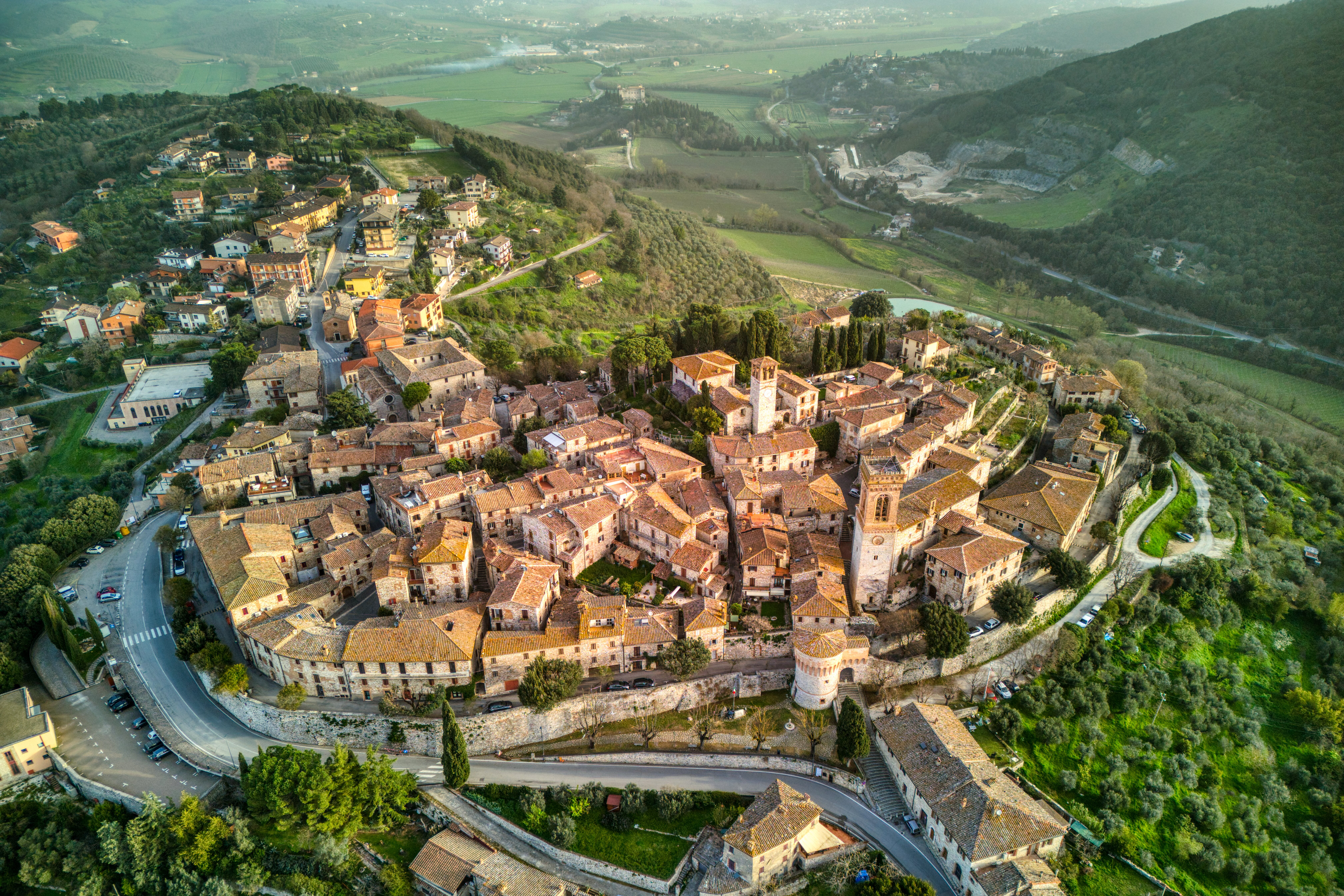
Corciano

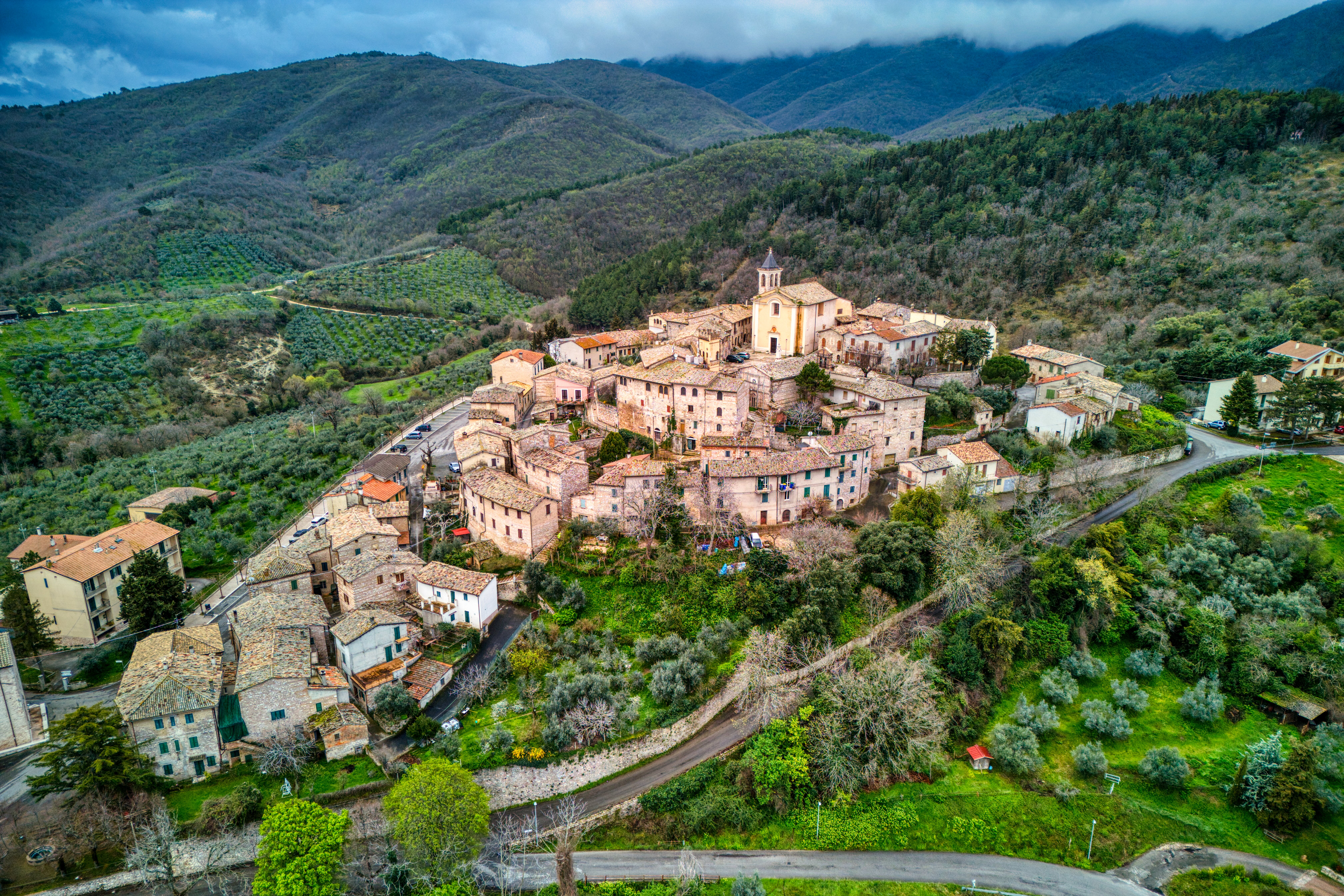
Giano dell'Umbria

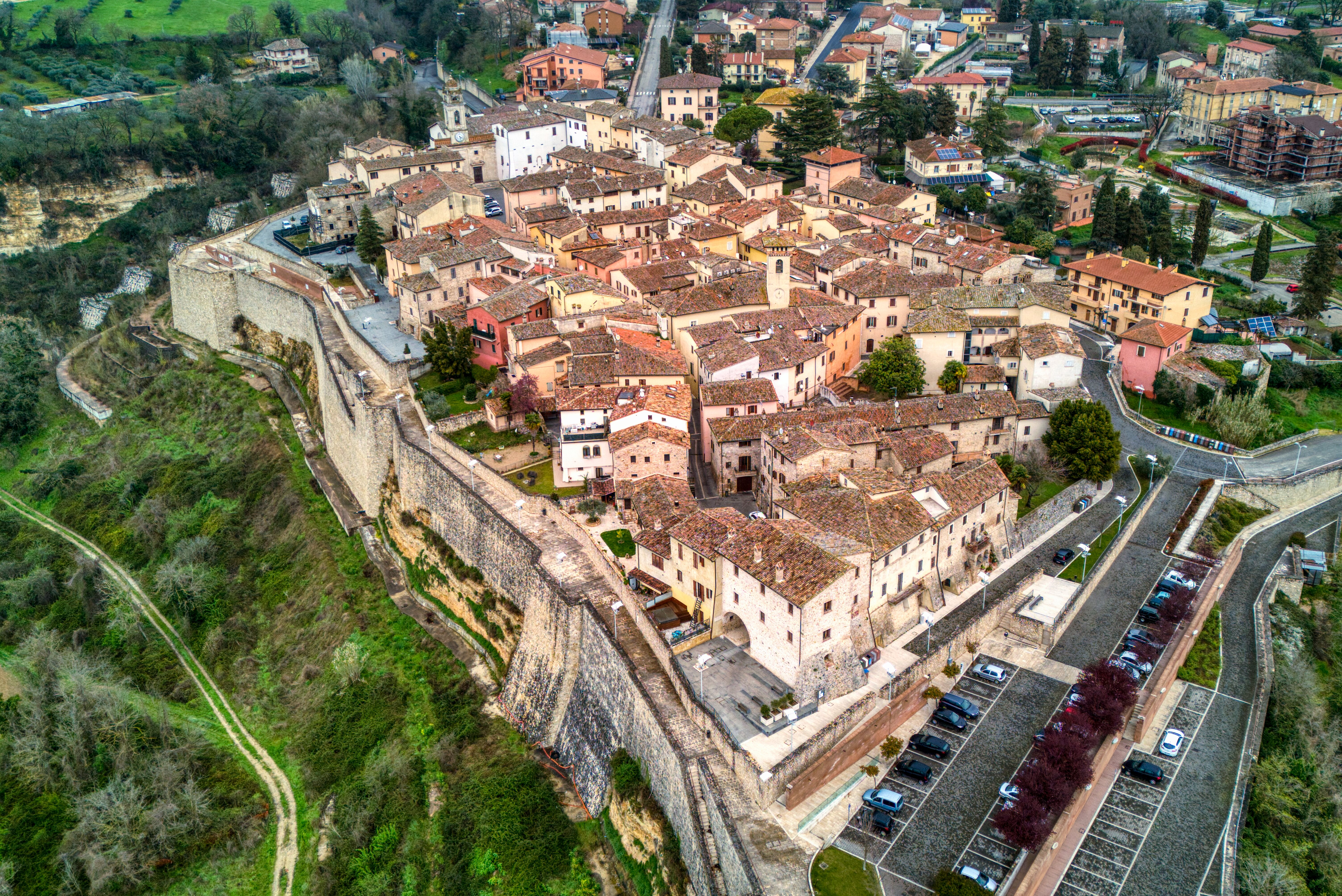
Massa Martana

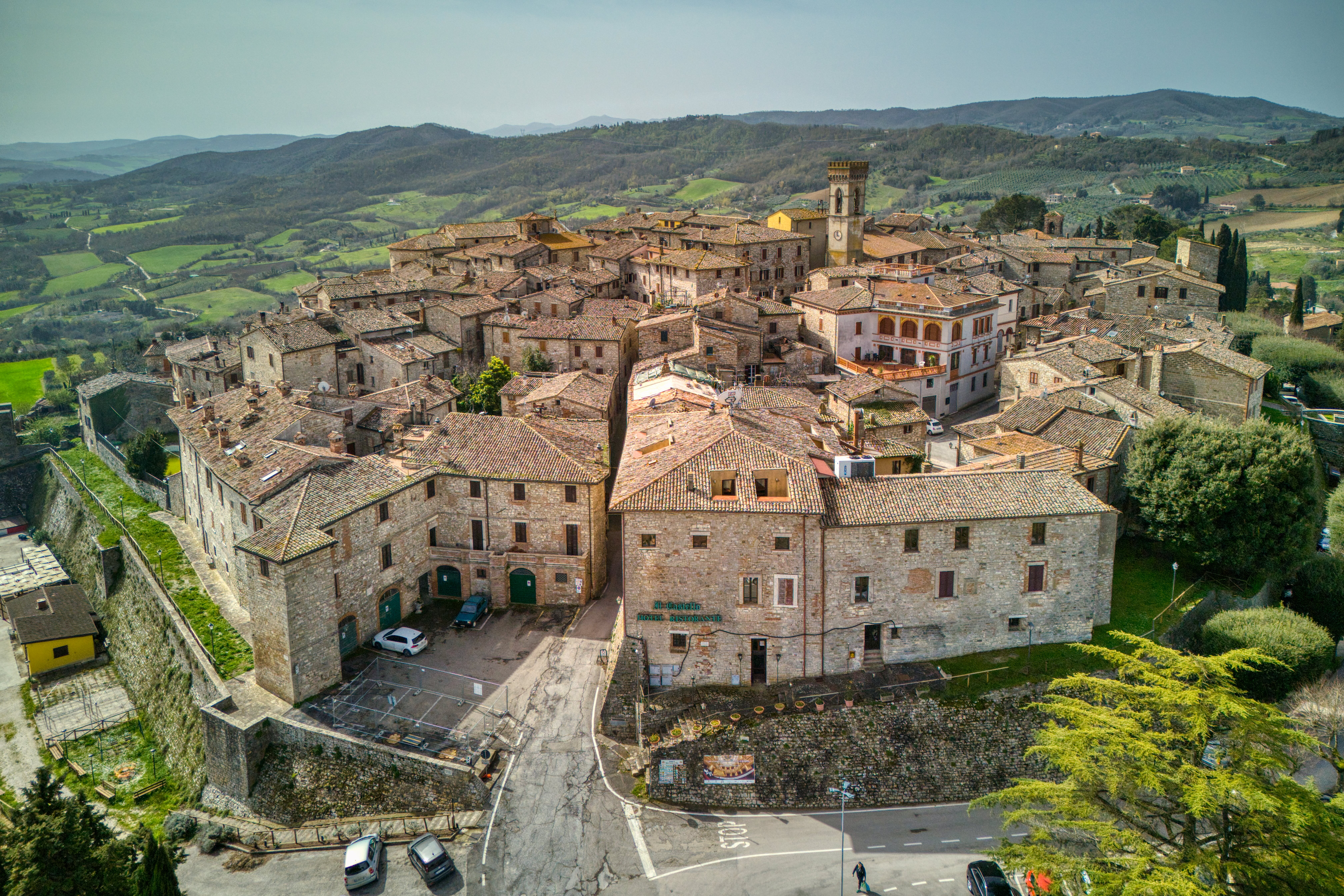
Monte Castello di Vibio

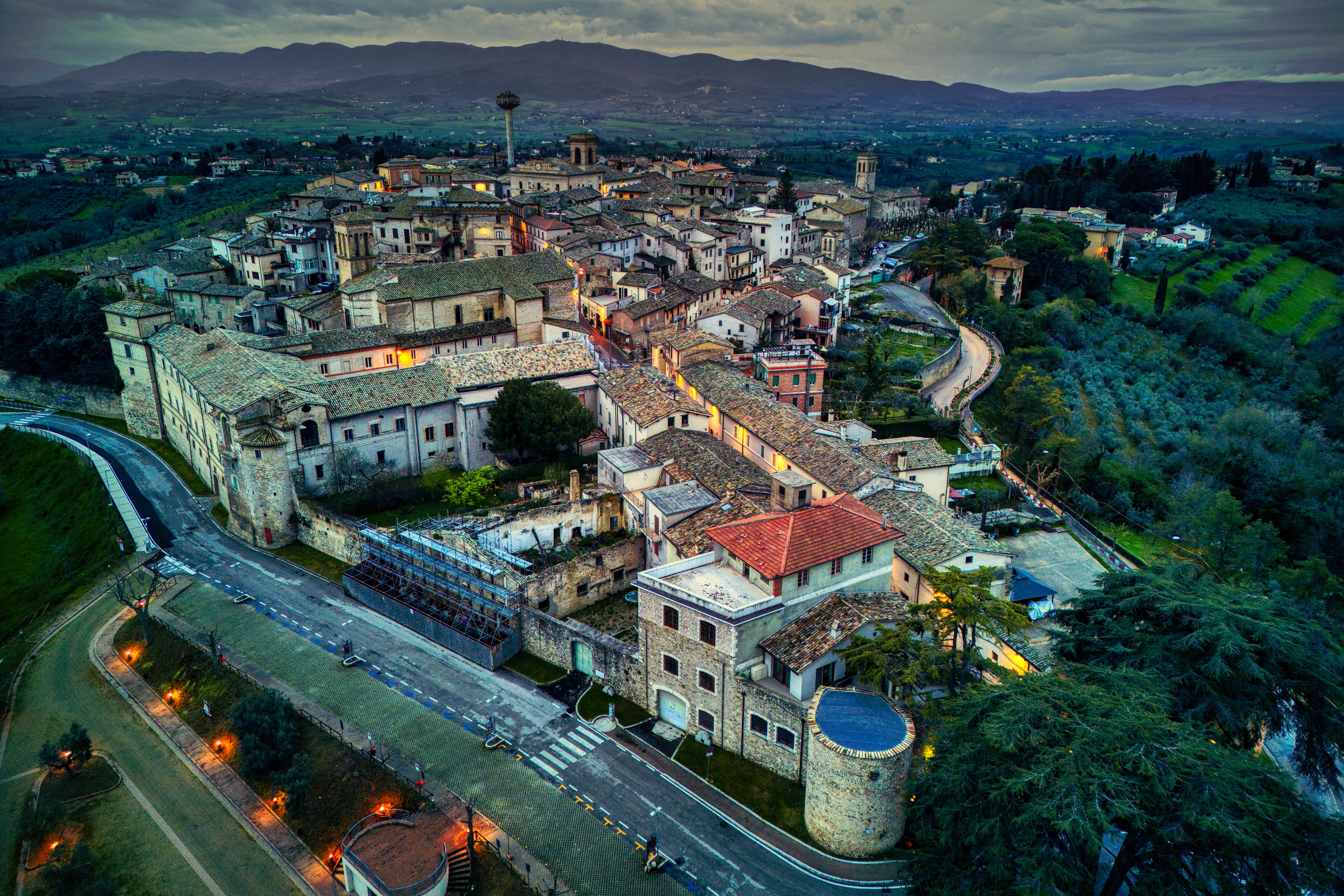
Montefalco

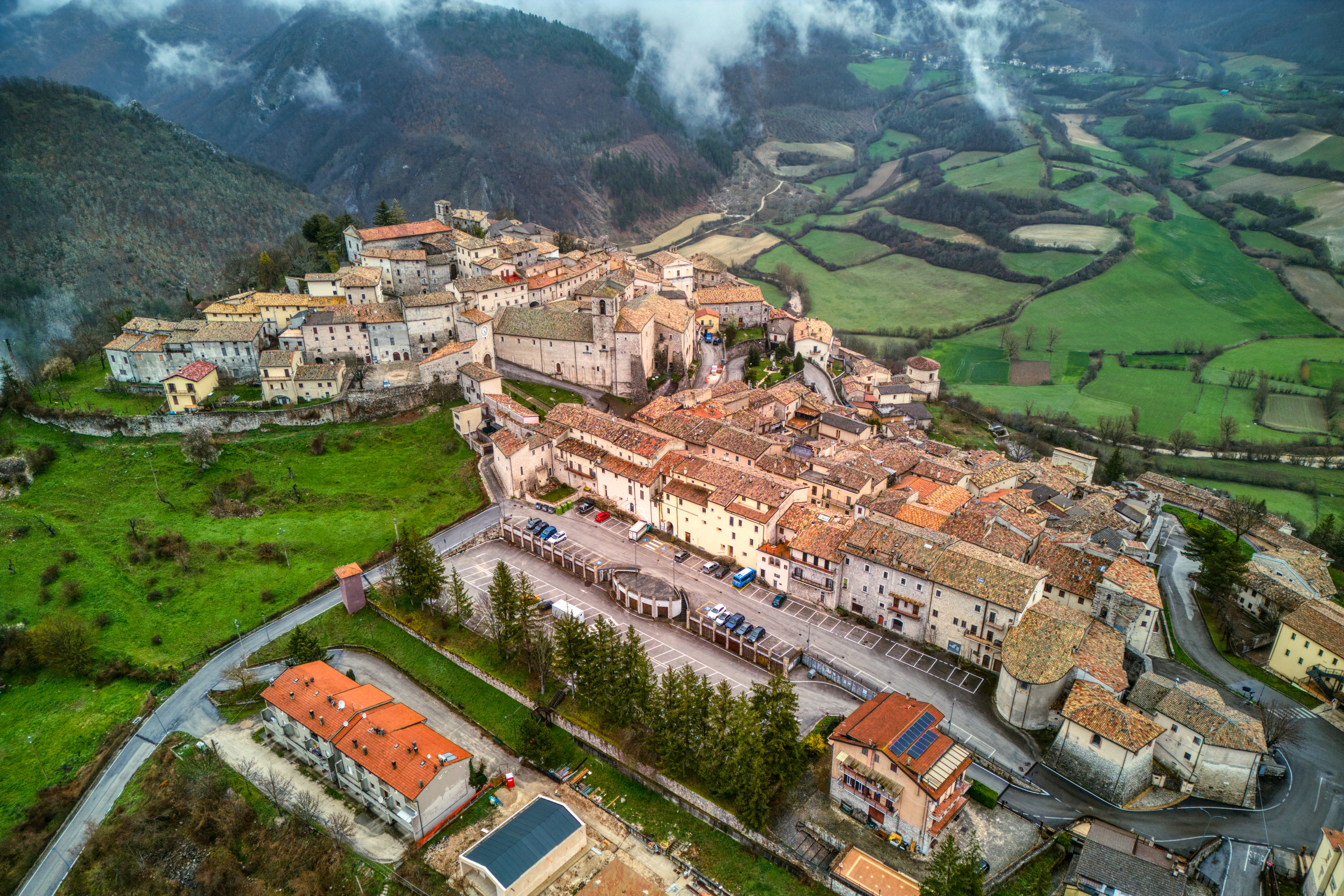
Monteleone di Spoleto

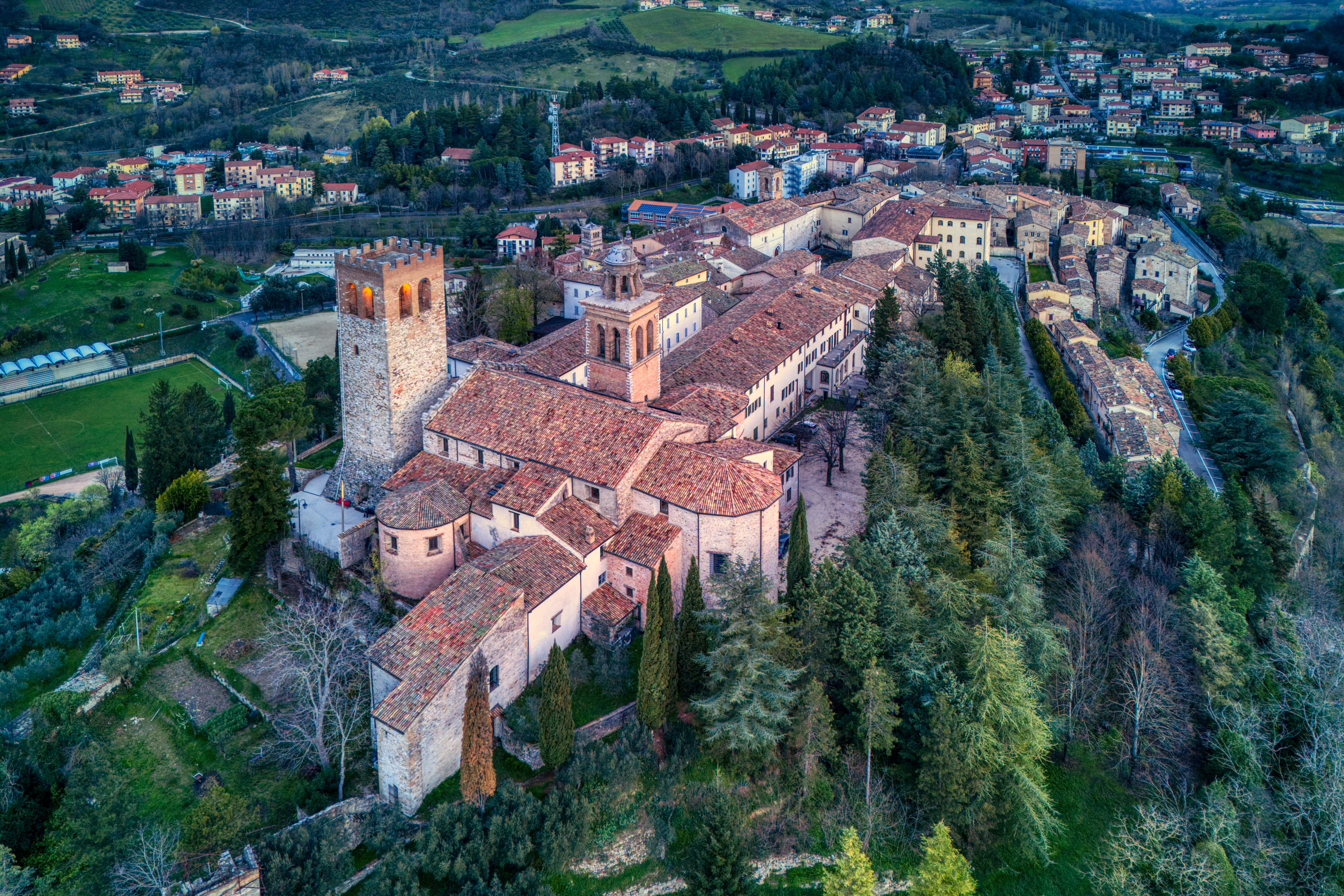
Nocera Umbra

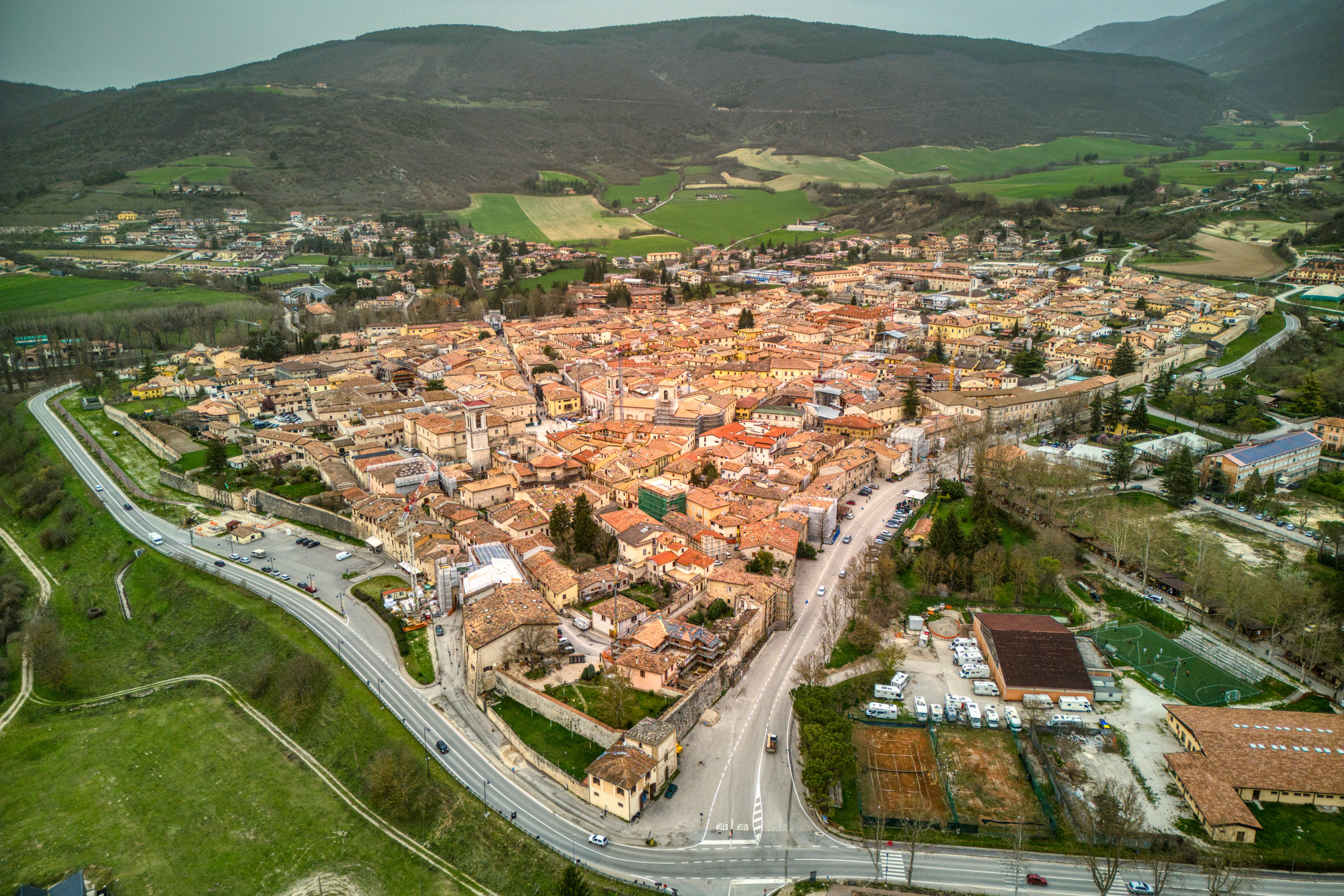
Norcia

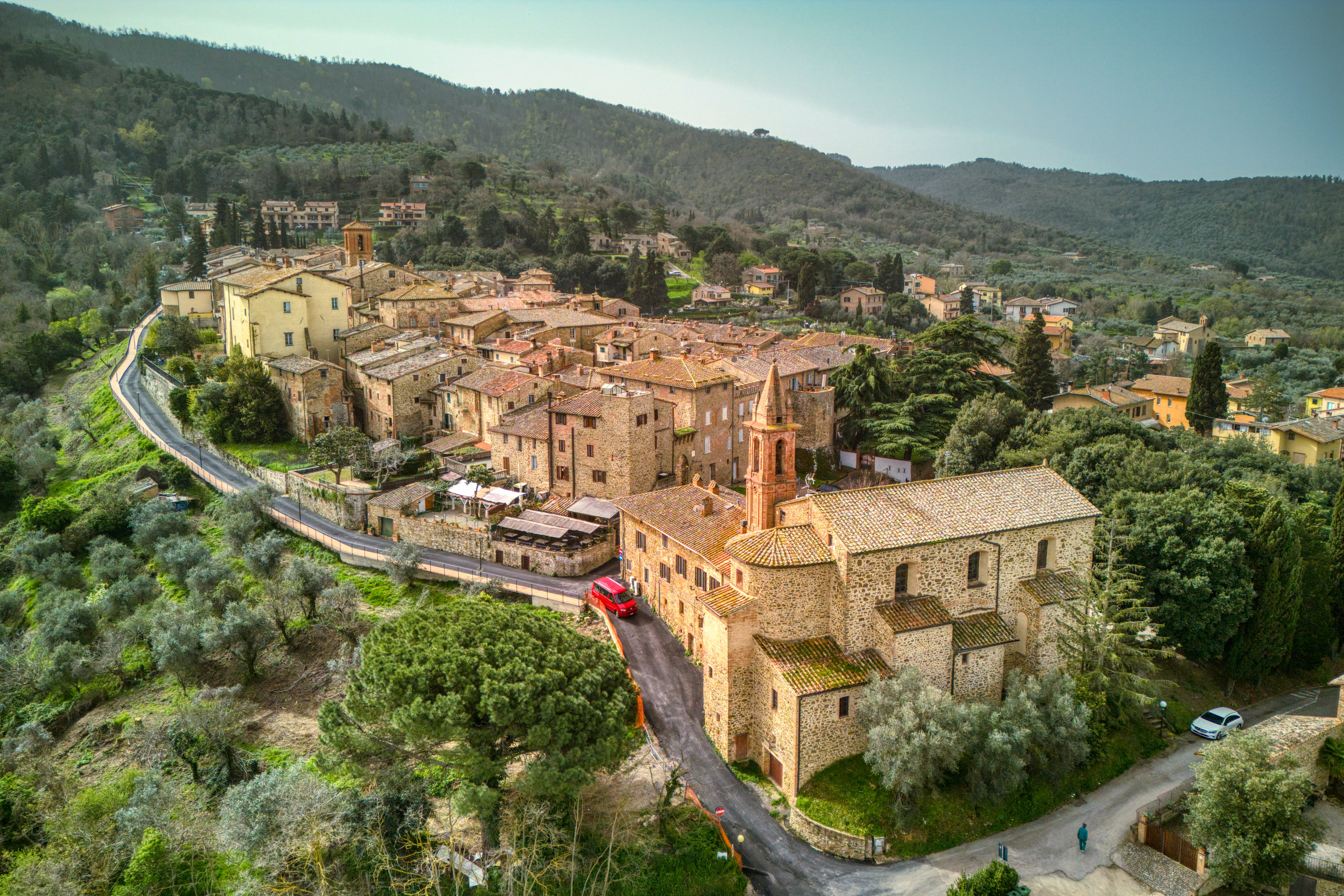
Paciano

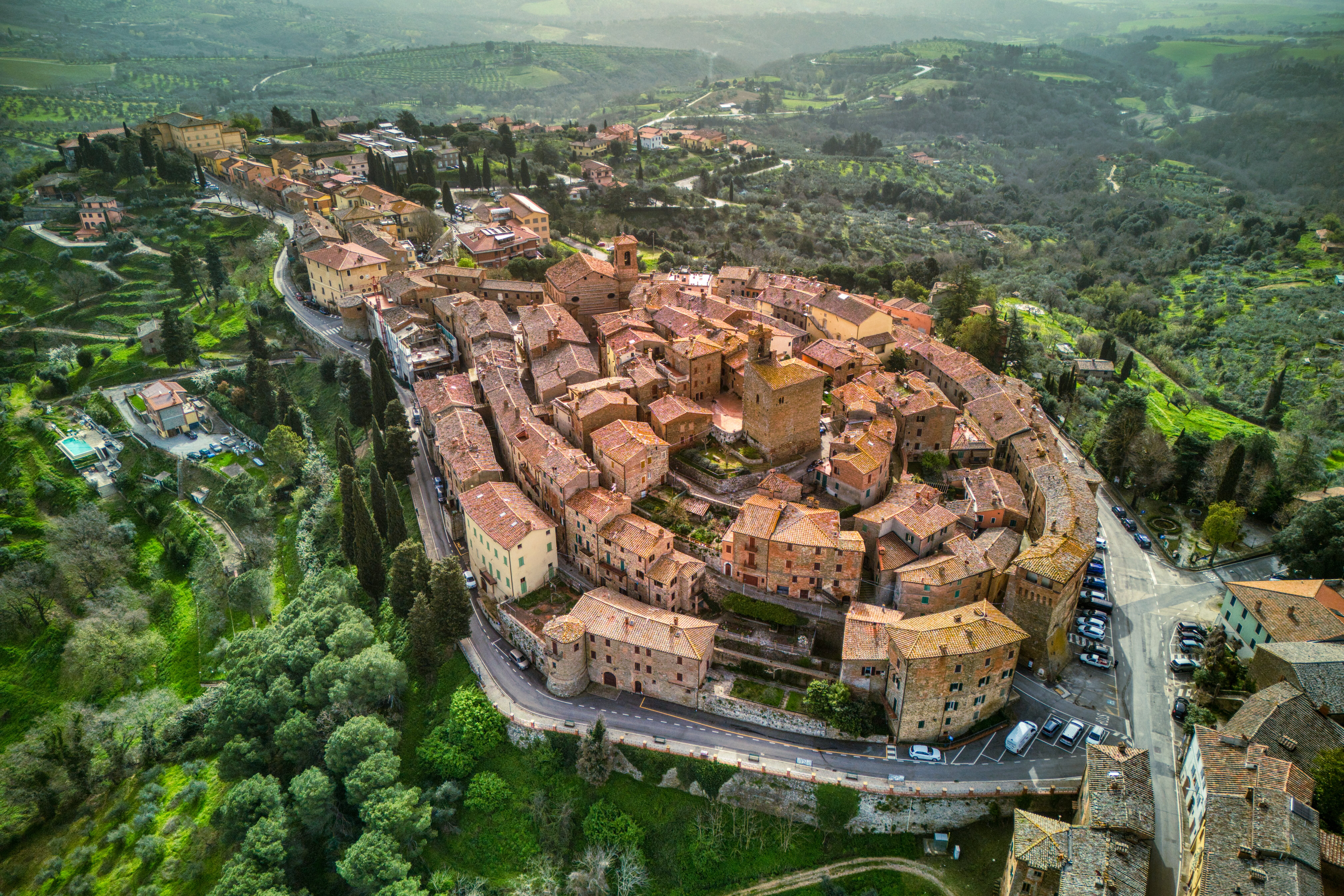
Panicale

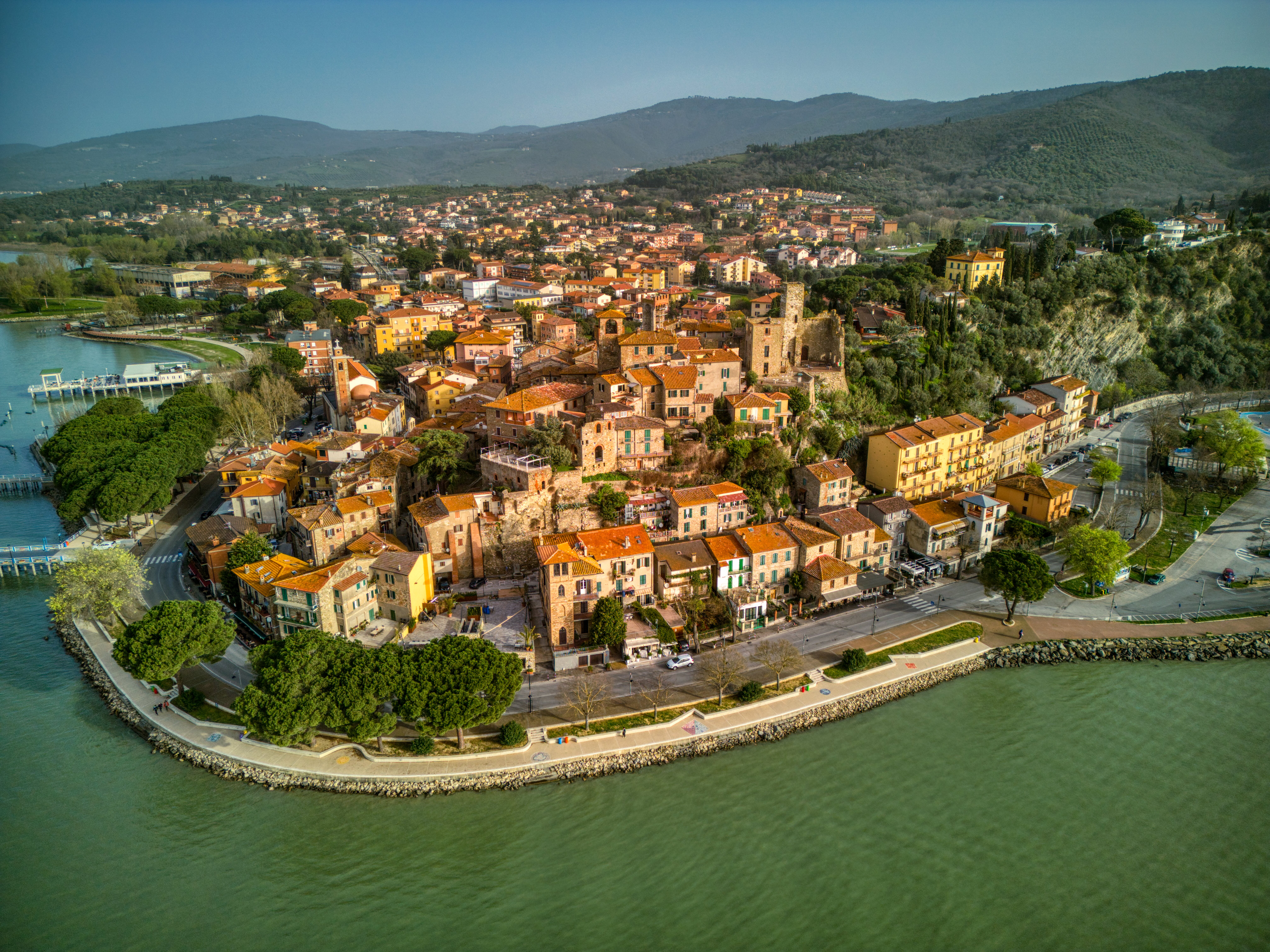
Passignano sul Trasimeno

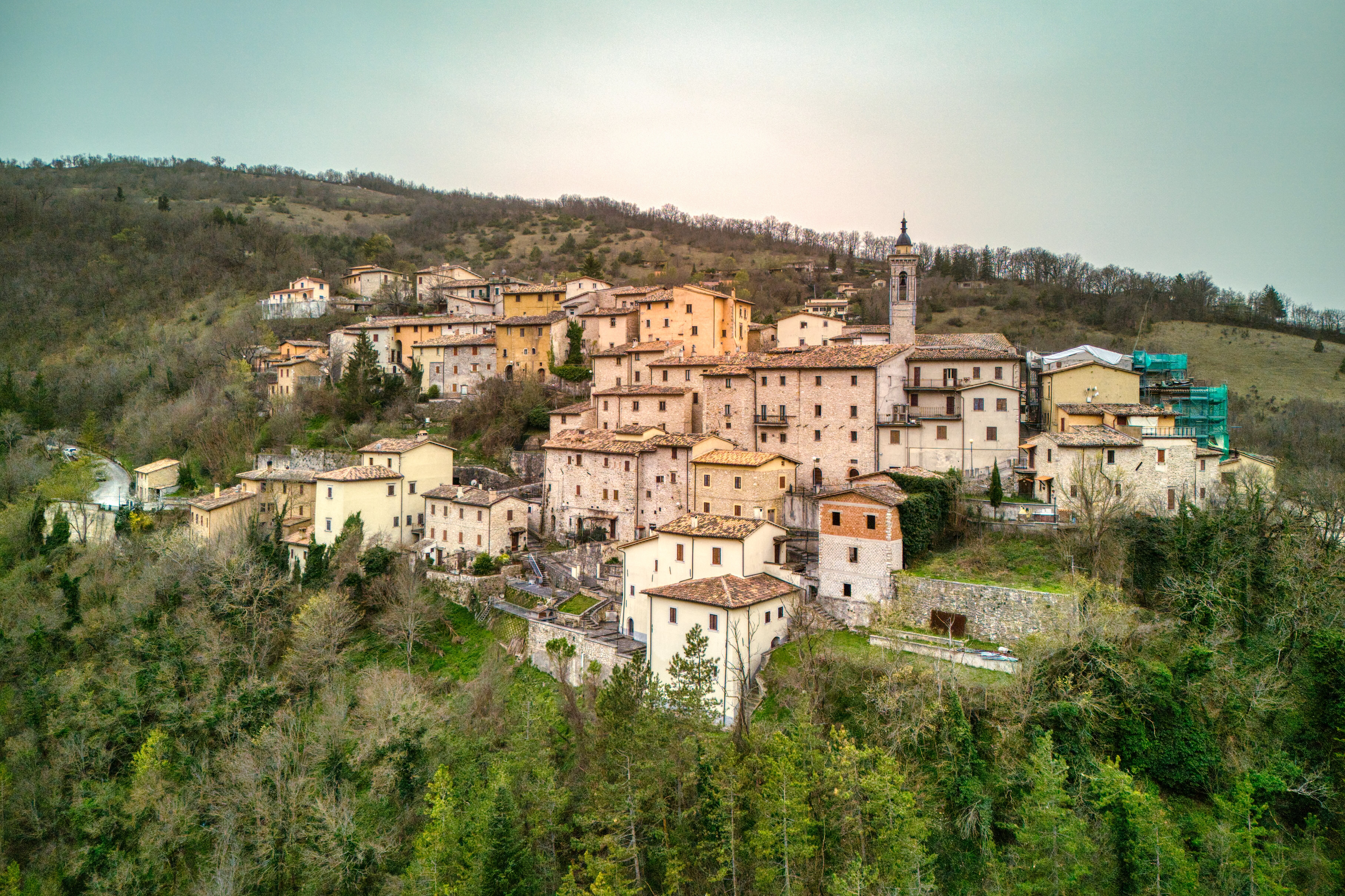
Preci

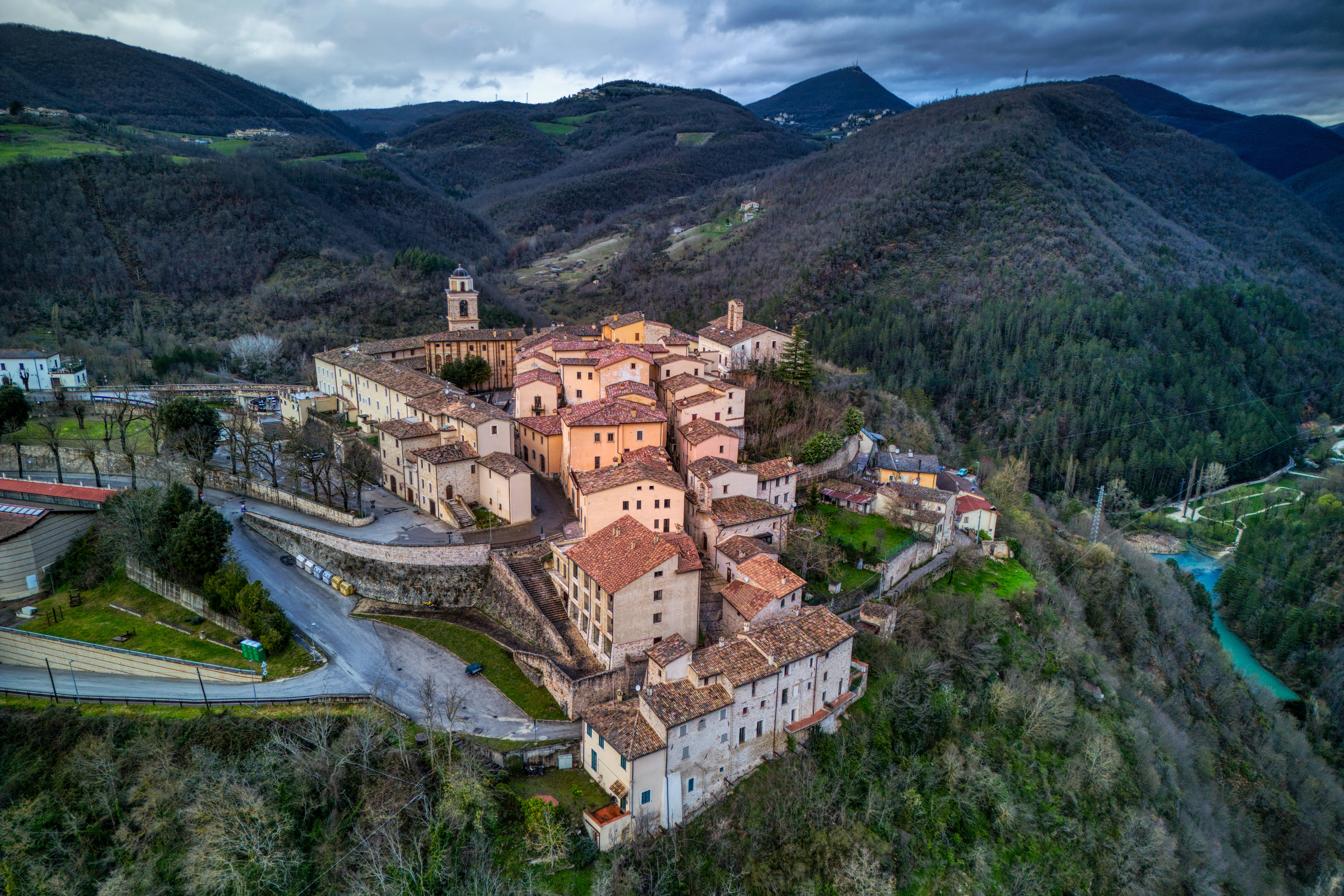
Sellano

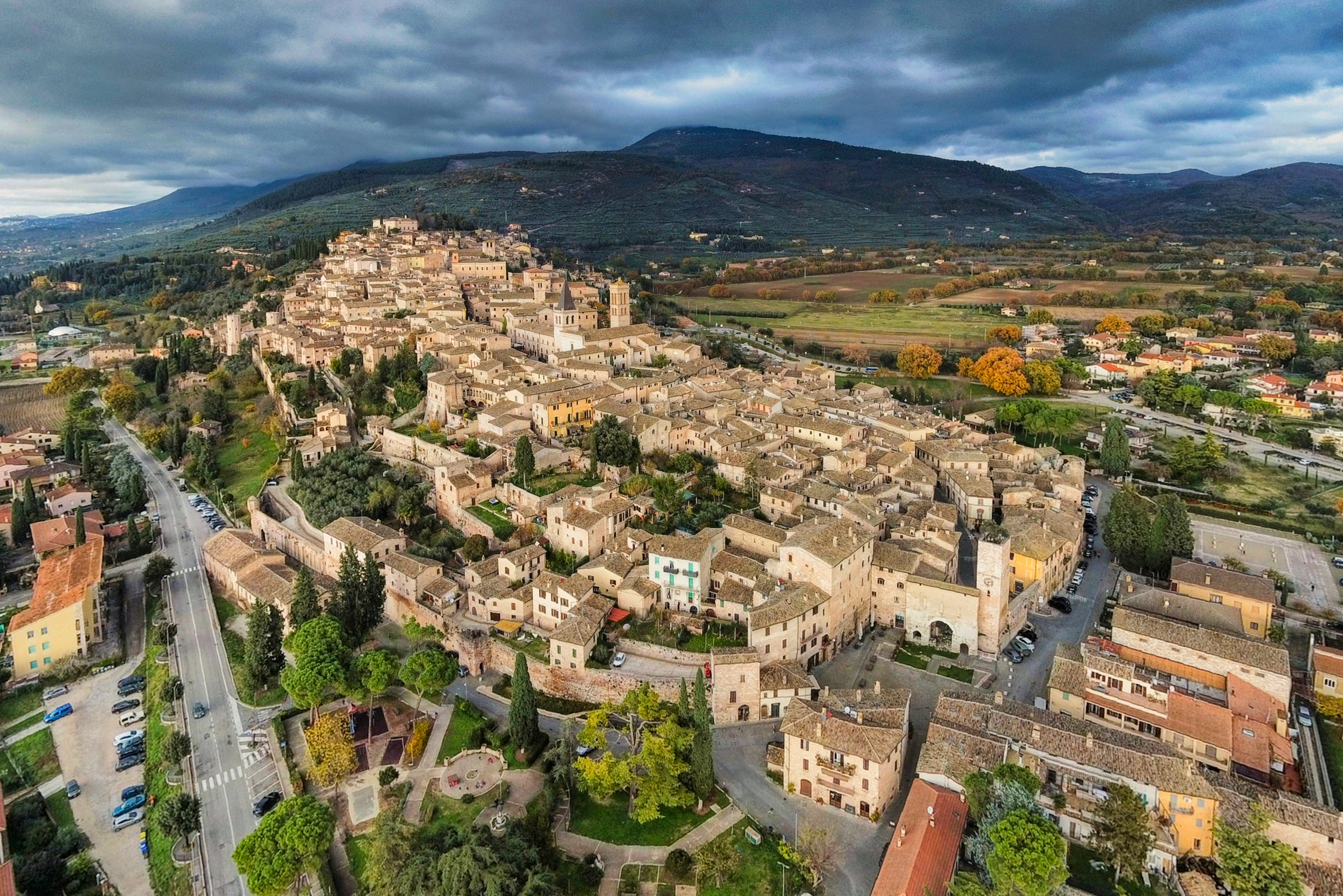
Spello

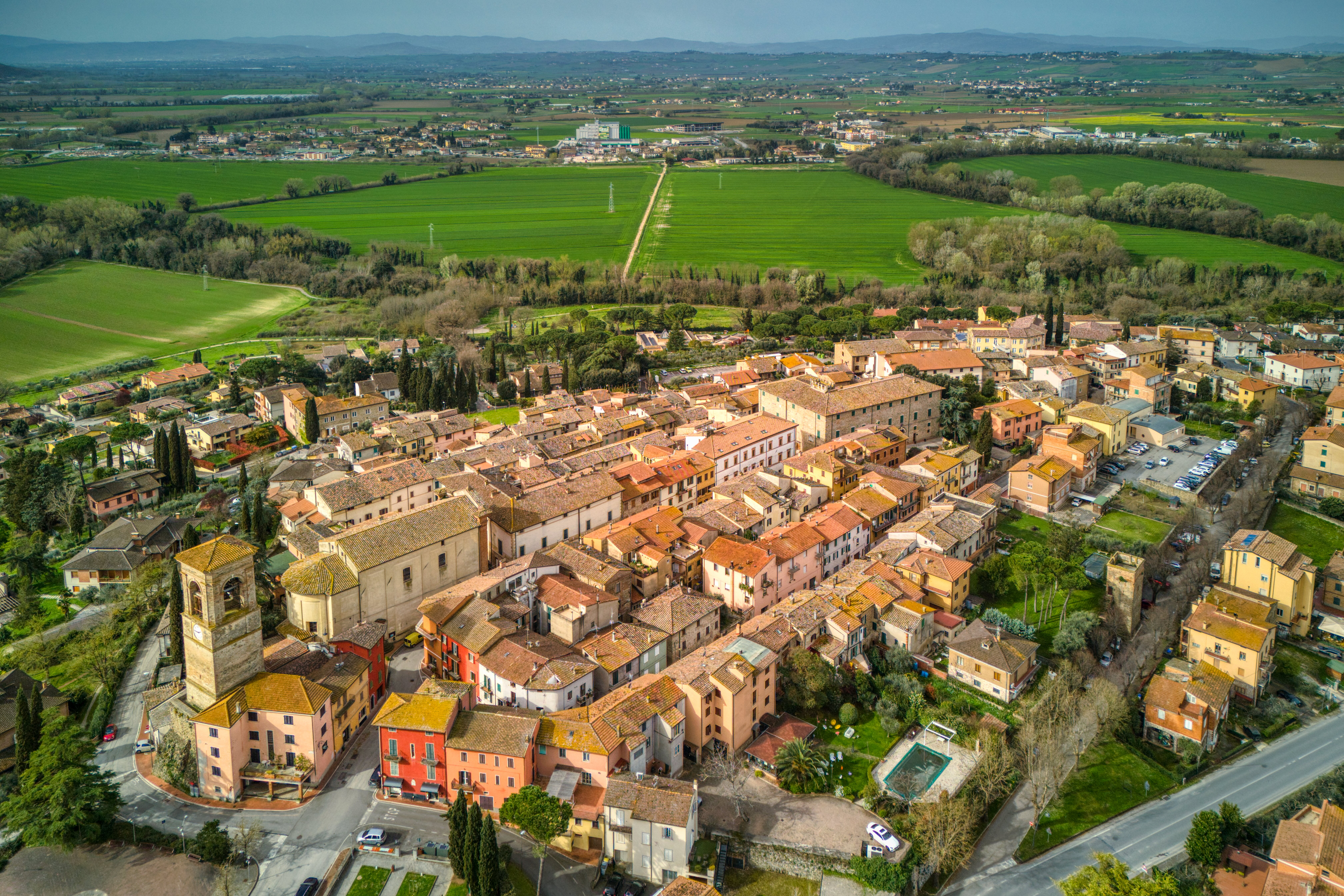
Torgiano

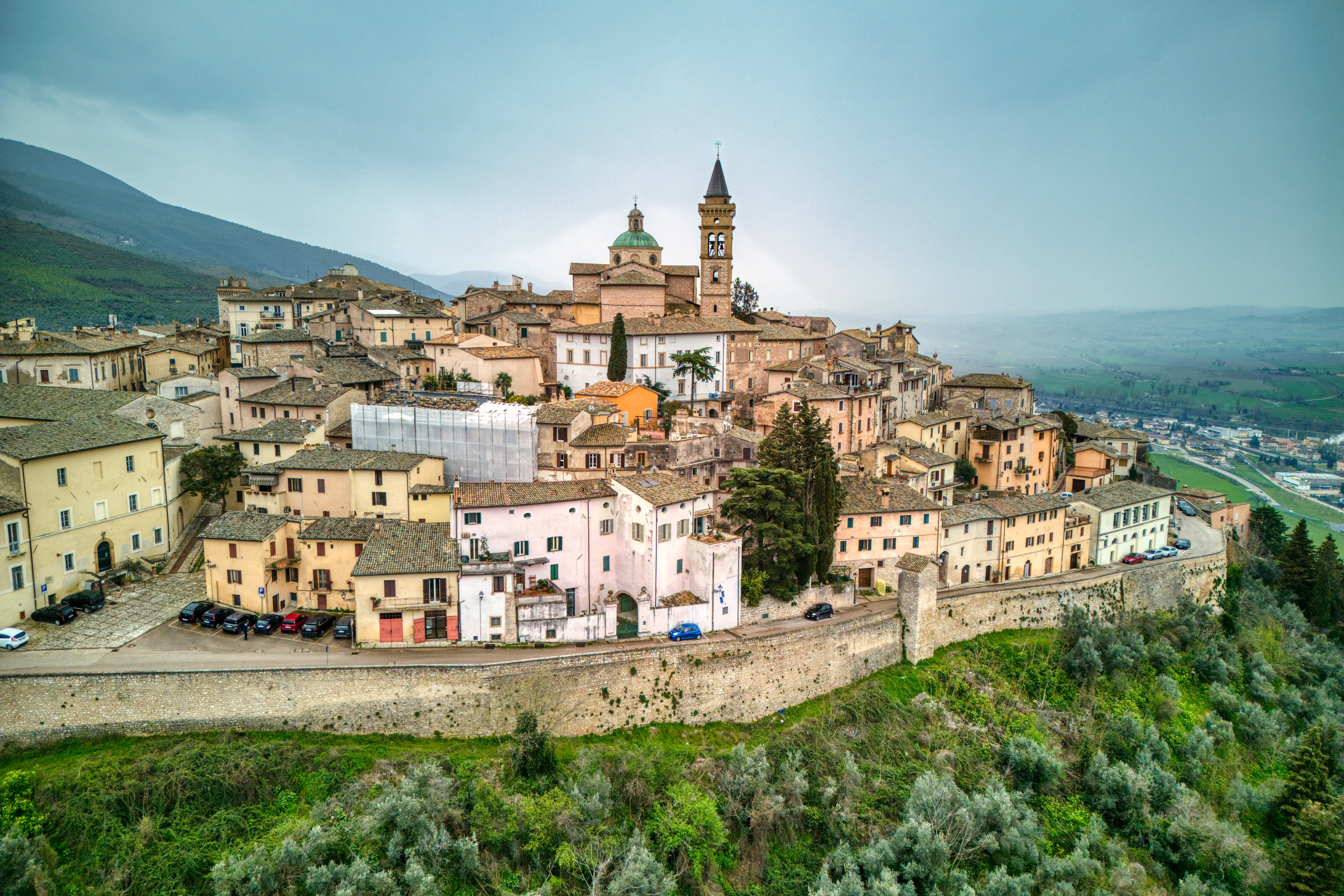
Trevi

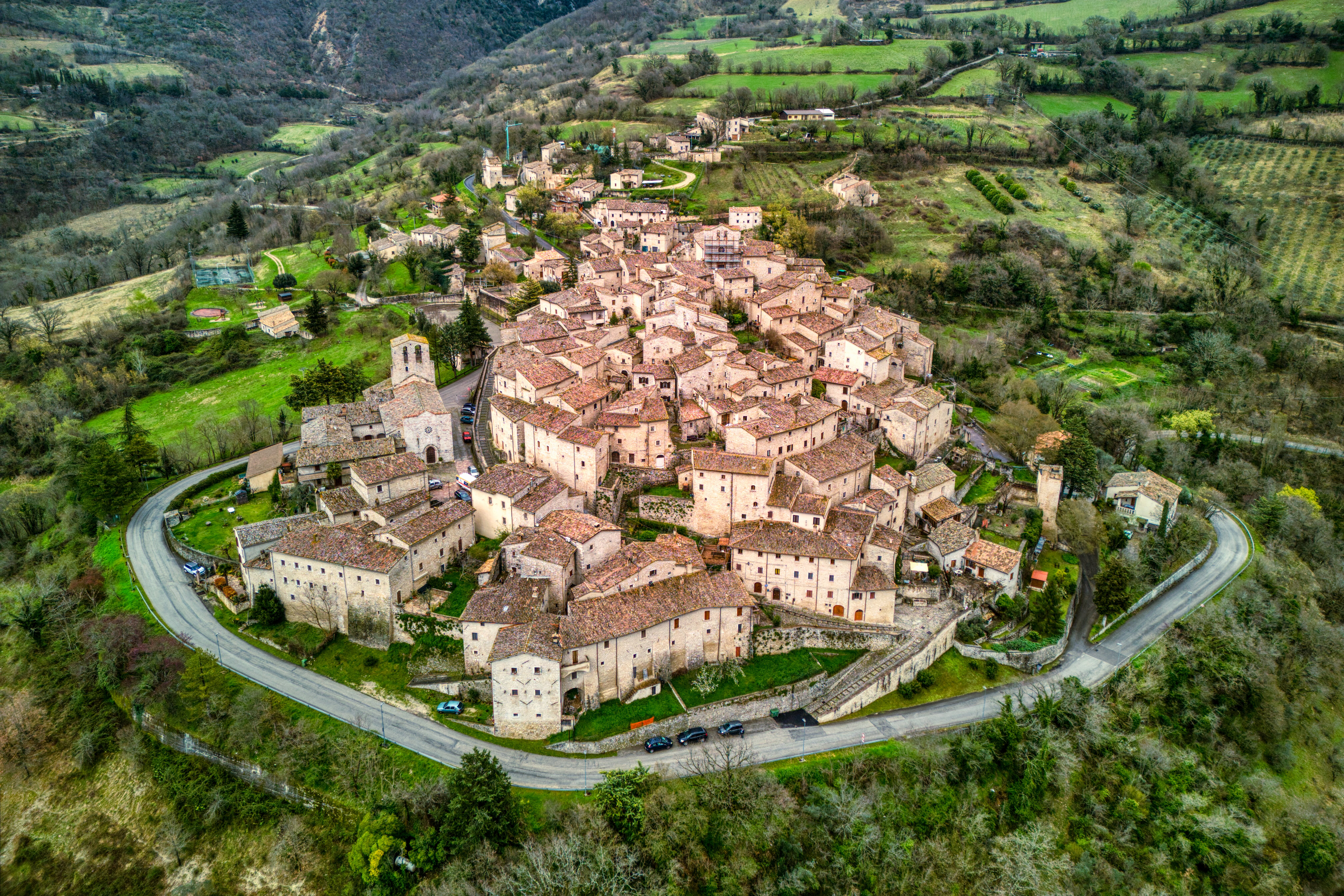
Vallo di Nera

== See also ==
- List of municipalities of Umbria
- List of municipalities of Italy
