= List of municipalities of the Province of Ravenna =

The following is a list of the 18 municipalities (comuni) of the Province of Ravenna in the region of Emilia-Romagna in Italy.

== List ==
Municipality	Population (2026)	Area (km²)	Density
Alfonsine	11,667	106.79	109.3
Bagnacavallo	16,519	79.58	207.6
Bagnara di Romagna	2,317	9.96	232.6
Brisighella	7,181	194.33	37.0
Casola Valsenio	2,489	84.42	29.5
Castel Bolognese	9,484	32.37	293.0
Cervia	29,075	82.27	353.4
Conselice	9,734	60.20	161.7
Cotignola	7,337	35.14	208.8
Faenza	58,750	215.76	272.3
Fusignano	8,258	24.55	336.4
Lugo	32,128	117.06	274.5
Massa Lombarda	10,928	37.25	293.4
Ravenna	156,475	653.82	239.3
Riolo Terme	5,824	44.26	131.6
Russi	12,282	46.26	265.5
Sant'Agata sul Santerno	2,834	9.37	302.5
Solarolo	4,461	26.04	171.3

== See also ==
- List of municipalities of Emilia-Romagna
- List of municipalities of Italy
