= List of municipalities of the Province of Ragusa =

This is a list of the 12 municipalities (comuni) of the Province of Ragusa in the autonomous region of Sicily in Italy.

== List ==
Municipality	Population (2026)	Area (km²)	Density	Location
Acate	10,657	102.47	104.0	
Chiaramonte Gulfi	8,045	127.38	63.2	
Comiso	30,437	65.40	465.4	
Giarratana	2,994	43.63	68.6	
Ispica	16,706	113.75	146.9	
Modica	53,622	292.37	183.4	
Monterosso Almo	2,705	56.55	47.8	
Pozzallo	18,958	15.38	1,232.6	
Ragusa	74,122	444.67	166.7	
Santa Croce Camerina	11,649	41.09	283.5	
Scicli	26,920	138.72	194.1	
Vittoria	66,329	182.48	363.5	

== See also ==
- List of municipalities of Sicily
- List of municipalities of Italy
