= List of municipalities of the Province of Enna =

The following is a list of the 20 municipalities (comuni) of the Province of Enna in the autonomous region of Sicily in Italy.

== List ==
| Municipality | Population (2026) | Area (km²) | Density |
|---|---|---|---|
| Agira | 7,529 | 164.08 | 45.9 |
| Aidone | 4,205 | 210.78 | 19.9 |
| Assoro | 4,749 | 112.15 | 42.3 |
| Barrafranca | 11,456 | 53.71 | 213.3 |
| Calascibetta | 3,948 | 89.12 | 44.3 |
| Catenanuova | 4,458 | 11.22 | 397.3 |
| Centuripe | 4,981 | 174.20 | 28.6 |
| Cerami | 1,867 | 95.05 | 19.6 |
| Enna | 24,884 | 358.75 | 69.4 |
| Gagliano Castelferrato | 3,111 | 56.24 | 55.3 |
| Leonforte | 12,023 | 84.39 | 142.5 |
| Nicosia | 12,382 | 218.51 | 56.7 |
| Nissoria | 2,781 | 61.83 | 45.0 |
| Piazza Armerina | 20,558 | 304.54 | 67.5 |
| Pietraperzia | 6,183 | 118.11 | 52.3 |
| Regalbuto | 6,556 | 170.29 | 38.5 |
| Sperlinga | 639 | 59.14 | 10.8 |
| Troina | 8,201 | 168.28 | 48.7 |
| Valguarnera Caropepe | 6,743 | 9.41 | 716.6 |
| Villarosa | 4,271 | 54.89 | 77.8 |

== See also ==
- List of municipalities of Sicily
- List of municipalities of Italy
