= List of municipalities of the Province of Siena =

The following is a list of the 35 municipalities (comuni) of the Province of Siena in the region of Tuscany in Italy.

== List ==
Municipality	Population (2026)	Area (km^{2})	Density
Abbadia San Salvatore	6,117	58.99	103.7
Asciano	6,782	215.64	31.5
Buonconvento	2,936	64.84	45.3
Casole d'Elsa	3,669	148.69	24.7
Castellina in Chianti	2,591	99.80	26.0
Castelnuovo Berardenga	8,764	177.11	49.5
Castiglione d'Orcia	2,046	141.66	14.4
Cetona	2,441	53.57	45.6
Chianciano Terme	7,143	36.58	195.3
Chiusdino	1,704	141.62	12.0
Chiusi	8,052	58.15	138.5
Colle di Val d'Elsa	21,665	92.06	235.3
Gaiole in Chianti	2,460	128.89	19.1
Montalcino	5,530	310.31	17.8
Montepulciano	13,017	165.33	78.7
Monteriggioni	10,063	99.72	100.9
Monteroni d'Arbia	9,019	105.91	85.2
Monticiano	1,636	109.50	14.9
Murlo	2,475	114.61	21.6
Piancastagnaio	3,839	69.63	55.1
Pienza	1,900	122.96	15.5
Poggibonsi	28,048	70.59	397.3
Radda in Chianti	1,431	80.42	17.8
Radicofani	1,024	118.10	8.7
Radicondoli	969	132.57	7.3
Rapolano Terme	5,103	83.04	61.5
San Casciano dei Bagni	1,417	92.14	15.4
San Gimignano	7,463	138.60	53.8
San Quirico d'Orcia	2,530	42.12	60.1
Sarteano	4,494	84.81	53.0
Siena	53,180	118.53	448.7
Sinalunga	12,093	78.66	153.7
Sovicille	9,844	143.61	68.5
Torrita di Siena	6,942	58.24	119.2
Trequanda	1,115	63.98	17.4

== See also ==
- List of municipalities of Tuscany
- List of municipalities of Italy
