= List of municipalities of the Province of Pistoia =

The following is a list of the 20 municipalities (comuni) of the Province of Pistoia in the region of Tuscany in Italy.

== List ==
Municipality	Population (2026)	Area (km²)	Density
Abetone Cutigliano	1,834	74.94	24.5
Agliana	17,984	11.68	1,539.7
Buggiano	8,738	16.04	544.8
Chiesina Uzzanese	4,619	7.20	641.5
Lamporecchio	7,360	22.25	330.8
Larciano	6,341	24.97	253.9
Marliana	3,353	43.04	77.9
Massa e Cozzile	7,752	16.01	484.2
Monsummano Terme	20,863	32.62	639.6
Montale	10,463	32.17	325.2
Montecatini-Terme	21,805	17.69	1,232.6
Pescia	19,213	79.18	242.6
Pieve a Nievole	9,235	12.67	728.9
Pistoia	89,094	236.17	377.2
Ponte Buggianese	8,893	29.53	301.2
Quarrata	27,028	45.91	588.7
Sambuca Pistoiese	1,406	77.25	18.2
San Marcello Piteglio	7,410	134.96	54.9
Serravalle Pistoiese	11,830	42.05	281.3
Uzzano	5,646	7.80	723.8

== See also ==
- List of municipalities of Tuscany
- List of municipalities of Italy
