= List of municipalities of the Province of Livorno =

A list of the 19 municipalities (comuni) of the Province of Livorno in the region of Tuscany in Italy.

== List ==
Municipality	Population (2026)	Area (km²)	Density
Bibbona	3,172	65.68	48.3
Campiglia Marittima	12,235	83.28	146.9
Campo nell'Elba	4,629	55.79	83.0
Capoliveri	3,970	39.56	100.4
Capraia Isola	347	19.33	18.0
Castagneto Carducci	8,639	142.33	60.7
Cecina	28,022	42.52	659.0
Collesalvetti	16,390	107.96	151.8
Livorno	152,451	104.50	1,458.9
Marciana	2,049	45.45	45.1
Marciana Marina	1,852	5.86	316.0
Piombino	32,374	129.88	249.3
Porto Azzurro	3,687	13.33	276.6
Portoferraio	11,748	48.48	242.3
Rio	3,427	36.52	93.8
Rosignano Marittimo	30,103	120.82	249.2
San Vincenzo	6,342	33.20	191.0
Sassetta	554	26.75	20.7
Suvereto	2,902	92.47	31.4

== See also ==
- List of municipalities of Tuscany
- List of municipalities of Italy

== See also ==
- Province of Livorno topics
