= List of municipalities of the Province of Grosseto =

The following is a list of the 28 municipalities (comuni) of the Province of Grosseto in the region of Tuscany in Italy.

== List ==
Municipality	Population (2026)	Area (km²)	Density
Arcidosso	4,341	93.26	46.5
Campagnatico	2,345	162.25	14.5
Capalbio	3,660	187.36	19.5
Castel del Piano	4,803	67.77	70.9
Castell'Azzara	1,254	64.23	19.5
Castiglione della Pescaia	7,056	209.28	33.7
Cinigiano	2,466	161.55	15.3
Civitella Paganico	2,953	192.90	15.3
Follonica	20,000	56.02	357.0
Gavorrano	8,356	163.98	51.0
Grosseto	81,275	473.55	171.6
Isola del Giglio	1,279	24.01	53.3
Magliano in Toscana	3,249	250.78	13.0
Manciano	6,850	372.51	18.4
Massa Marittima	8,197	283.45	28.9
Monte Argentario	11,605	60.40	192.1
Monterotondo Marittimo	1,274	102.59	12.4
Montieri	1,189	108.21	11.0
Orbetello	13,917	226.80	61.4
Pitigliano	3,515	101.97	34.5
Roccalbegna	909	124.86	7.3
Roccastrada	8,767	284.47	30.8
Santa Fiora	2,504	63.45	39.5
Scansano	4,360	273.53	15.9
Scarlino	3,680	88.29	41.7
Seggiano	1,054	49.43	21.3
Semproniano	1,022	81.65	12.5
Sorano	2,983	174.56	17.1

== See also ==
- List of municipalities of Tuscany
- List of municipalities of Italy
