= Molazzana =

- Comune
- Comune di Molazzana
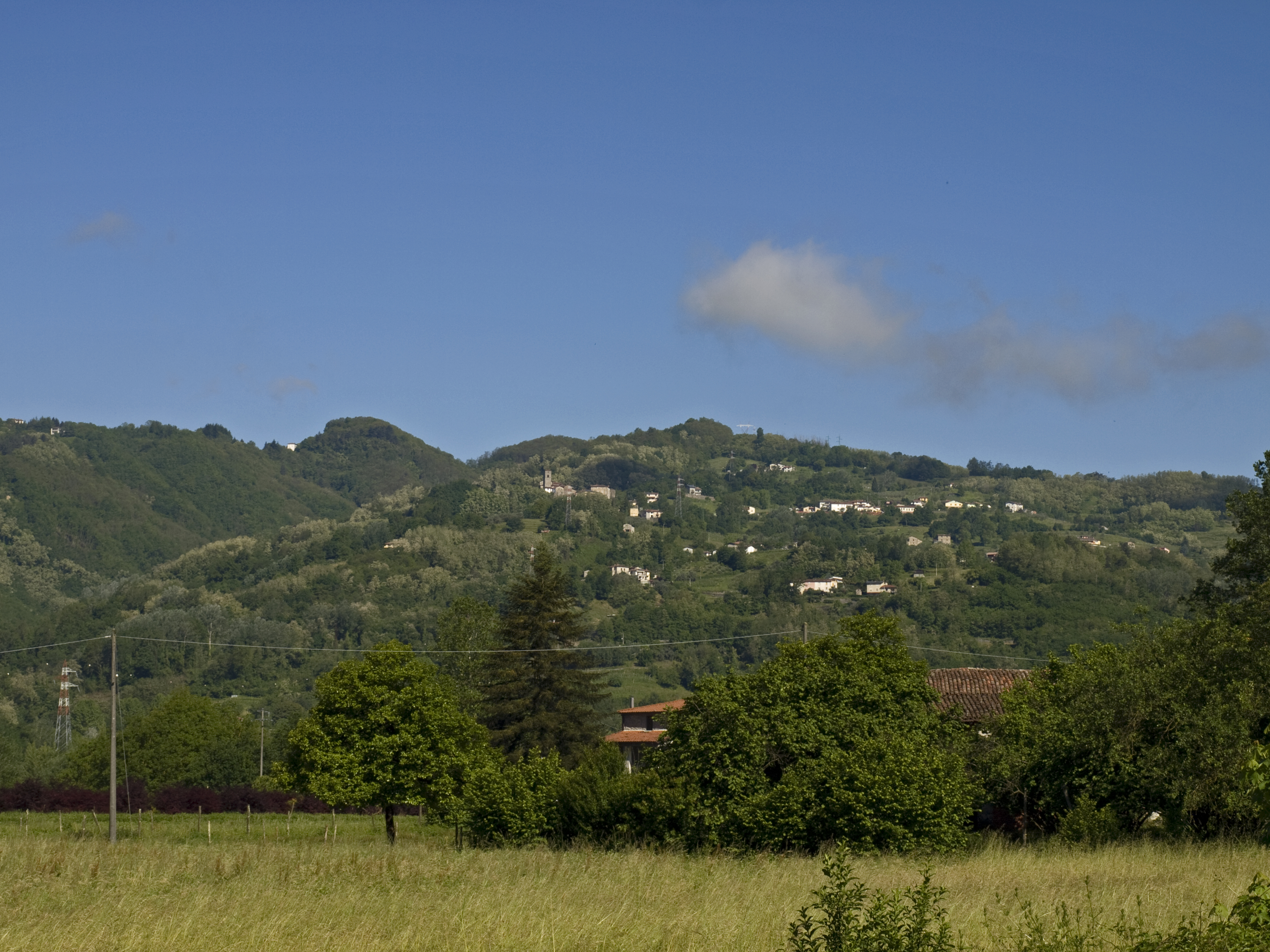
- Panorama of the villages of Cascio, Ca'Matteo, and Ca'Serafino

- Location within Italy Location within Tuscany
- Coordinates: 44°4′N 10°25′E
- Country: Italy
- Region: Tuscany
- Province: Lucca (LU)

Government
  - Mayor: Andrea Talani

Area
  - Total: 31.33 km^{2} (12.10 sq mi)
- Elevation: 474 m (1,555 ft)

Population (31 March 2017)
  - Total: 1,042
  - Density: 33.26/km^{2} (86.14/sq mi)
- Demonym: Molazzanesi
- Time zone: UTC+1 (CET)
  - Summer (DST): UTC+2 (CEST)
- Postal code: 55020
- Dialing code: 0583
- Website: Official website

Molazzana is a comune (municipality) in the Province of Lucca in the Italian region Tuscany, located about 70 kilometres (43 mi) northwest of Florence and about 25 kilometres (16 mi) northwest of Lucca.

Molazzana borders the following municipalities: Barga, Careggine, Castelnuovo di Garfagnana, Gallicano, Stazzema, Fabbriche di Vergemoli.
