= Casale Marittimo =

- Comune
- Comune di Casale Marittimo
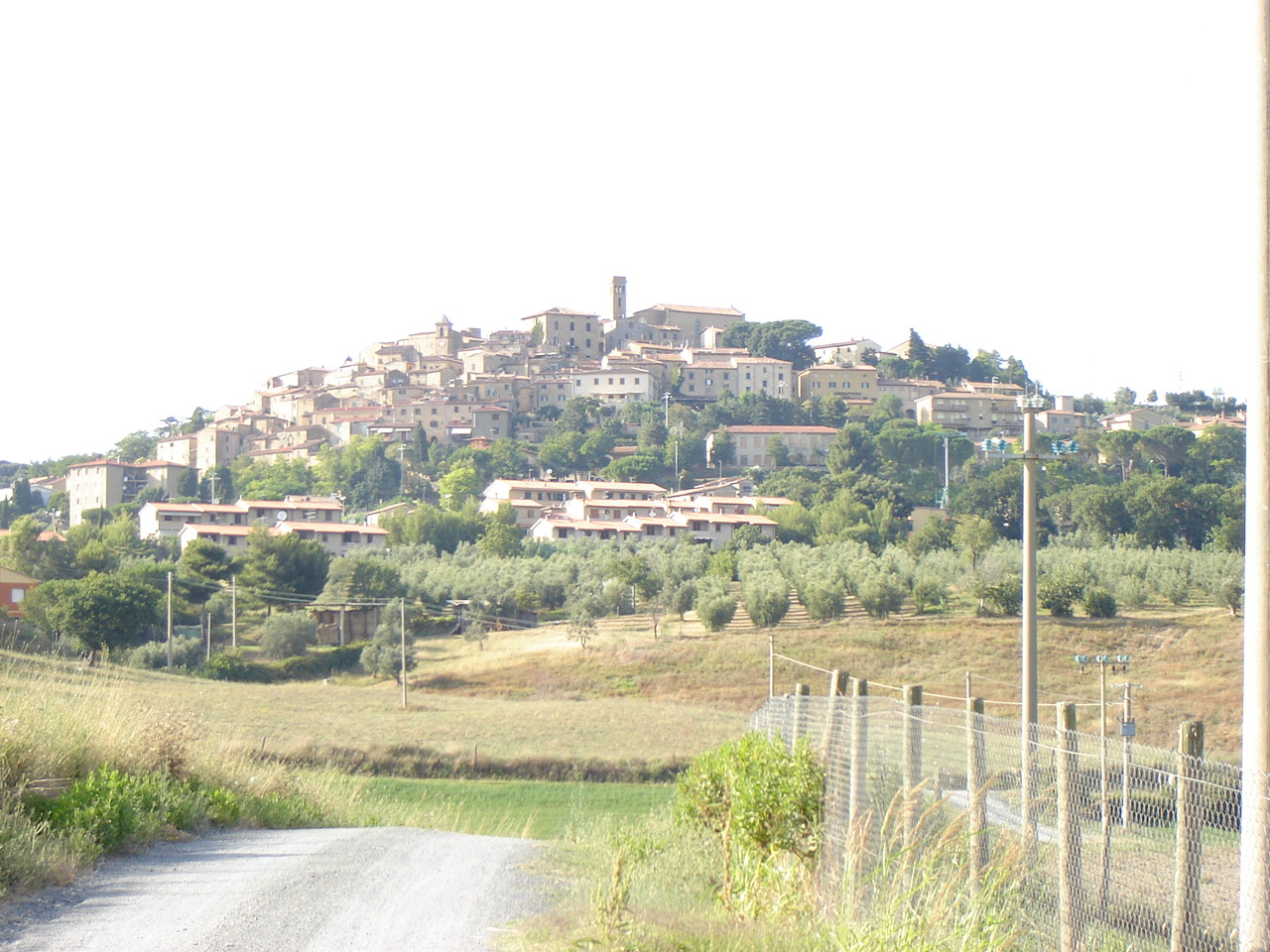

- Coat of arms

- Location within Italy Location within Tuscany
- Coordinates: 43°18′N 10°37′E
- Country: Italy
- Region: Tuscany
- Province: Pisa (PI)

Government
  - Mayor: Claudia Manzi

Area
  - Total: 14.3 km^{2} (5.5 sq mi)
- Elevation: 214 m (702 ft)

Population (2008)
  - Total: 1,005
  - Density: 70.3/km^{2} (182/sq mi)
- Demonym: Casalesi
- Time zone: UTC+1 (CET)
  - Summer (DST): UTC+2 (CEST)
- Postal code: 56040
- Dialing code: 0586
- Website: Official website

Casale Marittimo is a comune (municipality) in the Province of Pisa in the Italian region Tuscany, located about 70 kilometres (43 mi) southwest of Florence and about 50 kilometres (31 mi) southeast of Pisa. It is located in the Pisan Maremma.

Casale Marittimo borders the following municipalities: Bibbona, Cecina, Guardistallo. It is one of I Borghi più belli d'Italia ("The most beautiful villages of Italy").
