= Gello (disambiguation) =

Gello is a female demon or revenant in Greek mythology.

Gello may also refer to:

== Places in Italy ==
- Gello, Bibbiena, a village in the province of Arezzo
- Gello, Montecatini Val di Cecina, a village in the province of Pisa
- Gello, Palaia, a village in the province of Pisa
- Gello, Pescaglia, a village in the province of Lucca
- Gello, Pistoia, a village in the province of Pistoia
- Gello, Pontedera, a village in the province of Pisa
- Gello, San Giuliano Terme, a village in the province of Pisa
- Gello Biscardo, a village in the province of Arezzo

== Other uses ==
- Gello Expression Language, a class-based object-oriented programming language
- Mir Mohammad Asim Kurd Gello (born 1957), Pakistani politician

== See also ==
- Jello (disambiguation)
- Geilo, a ski resort town in Norway
- Geilo (bishop) (died 888), Catholic bishop
