= Cecina (river) =

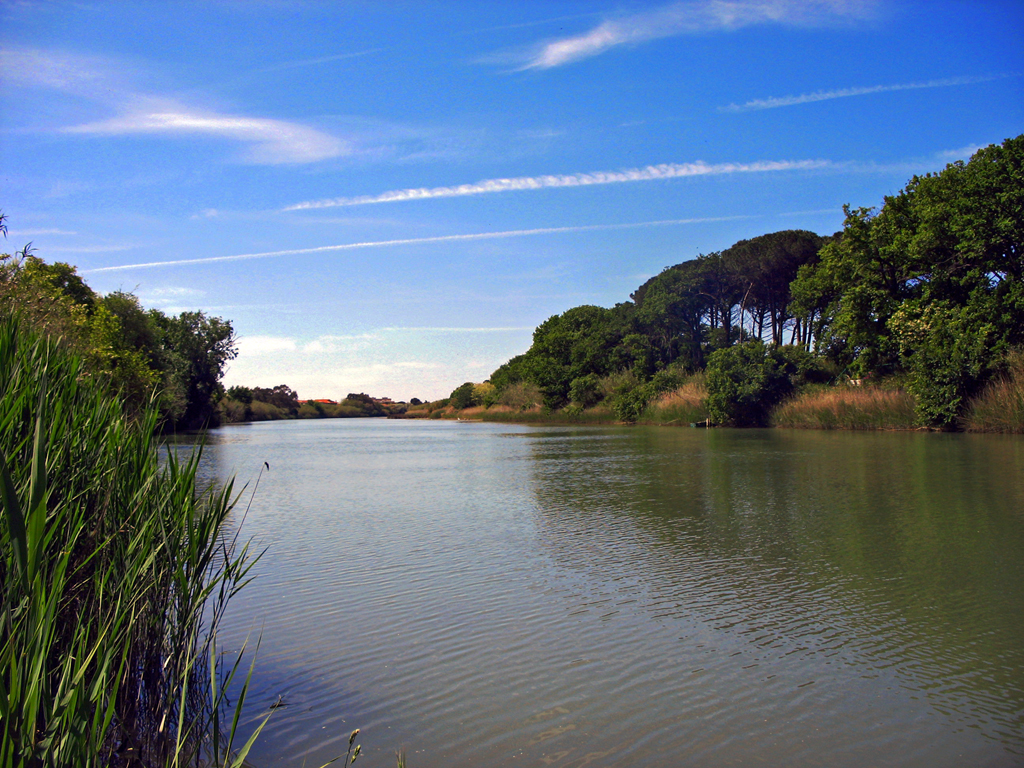

Location
- Country: Italy
- Region: Tuscany

Physical characteristics
- Source
  - location: Colline Metallifere
  - coordinates: 43°09′30.67″N 11°00′00.01″E
  - elevation: 850 metres (2,790 ft)
- Mouth
  - location: Mar Tirreno
  - coordinates: 43°18′07.30″N 10°29′16.40″E
  - elevation: 0 metres (0 ft)
- Length: 73 km (45 mi)
- Discharge
  - average: 15 cubic metres per second (530 cu ft/s)

The Cecina is a river in Italy.

== Etymology ==
The name "Cecina" is common to the nearby city of Cecina. It is probably originated from the name of a powerful Etruscan family of the area, Kaikna or Ceicna. In Roman period, it assumed the denomination of Caecina, from which derivative the current name Cecina.

== Geography ==
The source of the river is located in Montieri, Province of Grosseto, from the confluence of a number of streams, the largest of which is called Bucafaggi, in the impluvium between Poggio di Montieri and Cornate di Gianfalco, two peaks of the Colline Metallifere. Directing itself north, it flows to the west of Travale, and, after crossing for a small section the comune of Radicondoli, turns to north-west, in a section where it demarcates the boundary between the comuni of Castelnuovo Val di Cecina and Casole d'Elsa. It then enters in the territory of Pomarance, where it receives a major tributary, the Torrente Pavone.

After the river continues flowing on north-west direction, crossing the comuni of Pomarance, Volterra, Montecatini Val di Cecina, Montescudaio, Guardistallo and Riparbella. Then it receives other 2 tributaries, the Torrente Trossa, near Ponteginori; and the Sterza, near Casino di Terra.

In the final trait, the river crosses the homonymous comune of Cecina, where flows into the sea through an estuary.
