= Pavone (stream) =

Coordinates: 43°18′07″N 10°57′09″E

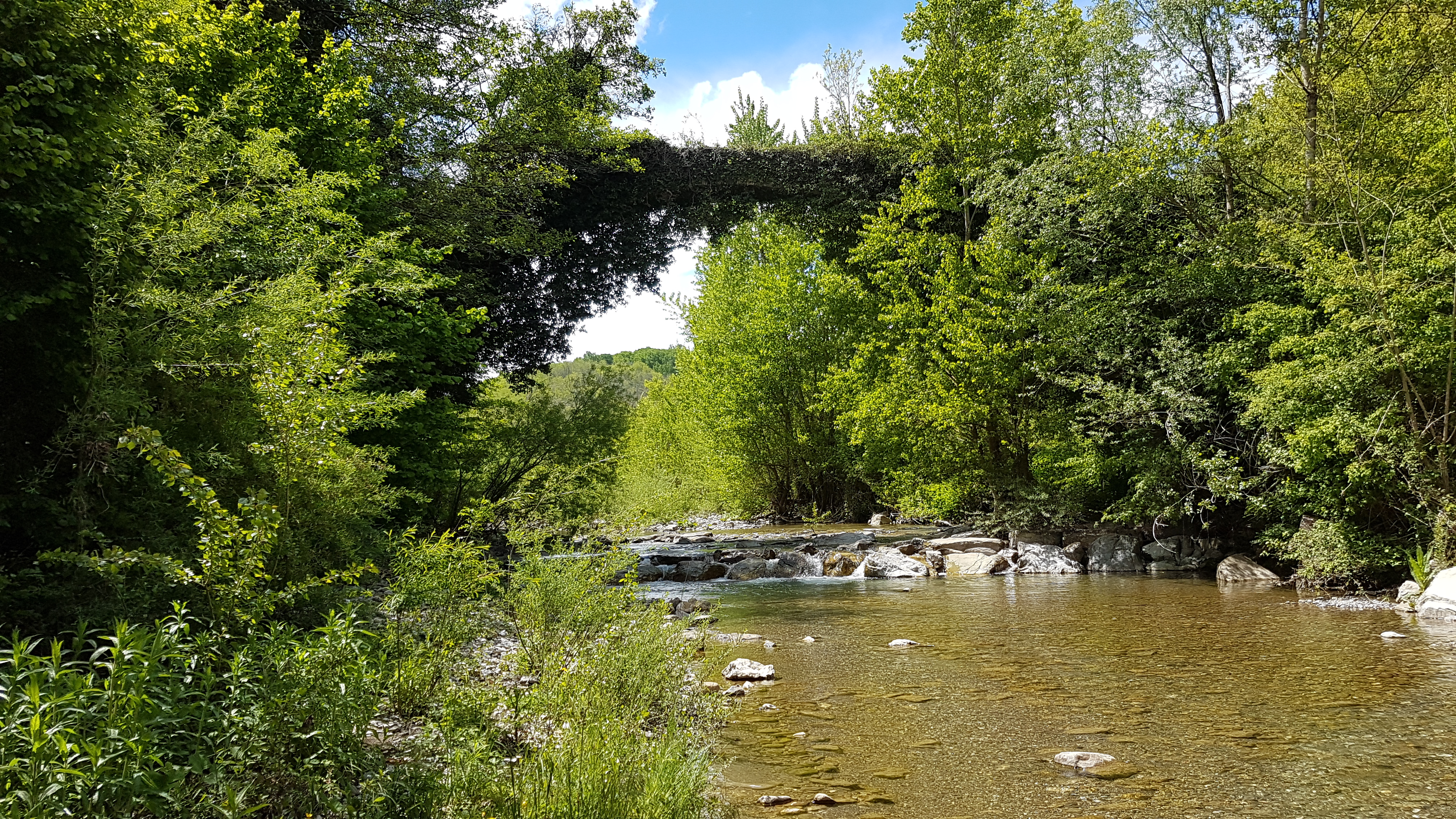
- Ruins of a medieval arch bridge over the Pavone stream

Location
- Country: Italy
- Region: Tuscany

Physical characteristics
- Length: 29 km (18 mi)

The Pavone is a stream in Tuscany, Italy. It originates in the Province of Grosseto but flows mainly through the southern part of the Province of Pisa, where it empties into the Cecina River as a left tributary at the southern boundary of the Berignone Forest Nature Reserve.

== Course ==
The stream rises on the western slope of Poggio di Montieri and flows a few kilometres westward before turning first northwest and then decisively north. From this point, its slope decreases but the current remains fast until it reaches its mouth.

The Pavone’s basin includes some of the most isolated areas of Tuscany, with low levels of human impact. The most significant nearby settlement is Castelnuovo di Val di Cecina, which lies about one kilometre from the riverbed. There are no significant industrial or artisanal facilities in the basin.

The total length of the Pavone is 29 km, with an elevation drop of about 780 m.

== See also ==
- Cecina
- List of rivers of Italy
