= Querceto =

Querceto may refer to:

- Robert de Chesney (died 1166), medieval bishop of Lincoln
- Querceto, a hamlet in the municipality of Casciana Terme Lari in Italy
- Querceto (Montecatini Val di Cecina), a frazione of the Province of Pisa in Italy
