= Battle of Altopascio =

- Part of the conflict between Guelphs and Ghibellines
Date	September 23, 1325
Location	outside Altopascio, present-day Italy
Result	Ghibelline victory

Belligerents
Florence (Guelphs)	Lucca (Ghibellines)

Commanders and leaders
Ramon de Cardona	Castruccio Castracani; Azzone Visconti

The Battle of Altopascio was fought in 1325 in Tuscany, between the Ghibelline forces of Lucca under Castruccio Castracani and those of Guelph Florence.

== Background ==
After subduing several Ghibelline towns, Castracani had conquered Pistoia and from there menaced Florence. The latter's troops moved to face him, but Castracani preferred to avoid a pitched battle; he took shelter in the local burgh of Cerruglio, waiting for reinforcements from his allies, the Bonacolsi, the Visconti and Cangrande della Scala.

Besieged by the Florentine commander, the Catalan Ramon de Cardona, the small garrison of Altopascio (500 men) resisted for 26 days (August 3–29), but in the end they had to surrender to the greatly superior Guelph forces (15,000 infantry and 2,500 cavalry, mostly composed of French, German and Burgundian mercenaries).

The winners put their camp at Altopascio, but started to suffer heavy losses due to the unhealthy environment. On September 21, a party seeking a site for a new camp was destroyed by Castracani's forces between Porcari and Montechiari. Cardona then moved his troops to the plain of Altopascio, which granted better possibilities of escape.

In the meantime the forces of Azzone Visconti, for which Castracani had paid 25,000 florins and according to Giovanni Villani's Nuova Cronica had to offer to the Milanese condottiero the most beautiful women of Lucca, had arrived in Lucca.

== The battle and the aftermath ==
The battle was fought on September 23, as Cardona aimed to obtain a victory before Visconti's men could arrive.

A first attack by the Florentine cavalry was successful, but in the second charge they were turned back by the Ghibelline counter-attack; the Guelph infantry was in turn routed by their mounted mates, while Visconti's cavalry, who had suddenly joined the battlefield, cut them off from any chance to escape.

Castracani was therefore able to conquer back Altopascio and other towns, while most of the Guelph commanders, including Cardona, were taken as prisoners. On October 2 Castracani reached Peretola and started to sack the territory around Florence for several days. For his victory, he was granted the title of Duke of Lucca by Emperor Louis IV and the city offered him a veritable Roman Triumph, in which the Florentine carroccio was shown in the streets.

== Sources ==
- Page at cronologia.it (in Italian)
