= Luigi Pera =

Italian engineer and architect (1899–1969)

- Born: 1899; Pisa, Kingdom of Italy
- Died: 13 February 1969 (aged 69–70); Pisa, Italy
- Occupations: Civil engineer, architect

Luigi Pera (1899 – 13 February 1969) was an Italian civil engineer and architect active primarily in his native Tuscany.

== Life ==
Pera graduated in engineering in Pisa in 1925 and later taught technical architecture and urban planning at the Faculty of Engineering. From 1952–1953 until his death, he served as director of the Institute of Architecture and Urban Planning in Pisa.

Active mainly in Tuscany, Pera designed major urban plans and public buildings in Pisa, including the city's master plan (1930), the Casa dello Studente, and the headquarters of the Royal School of Engineering. After World War II, he contributed to Pisa's reconstruction and designed bank buildings and housing projects in Volterra, including INA-Casa blocks and the new civil hospital (1958).

He also published essays, articles, and books on architectural subjects, including Architettura tecnica (1947) and Tecnica dell'architettura. Tipologia strutturale (1974).

== Selected works ==
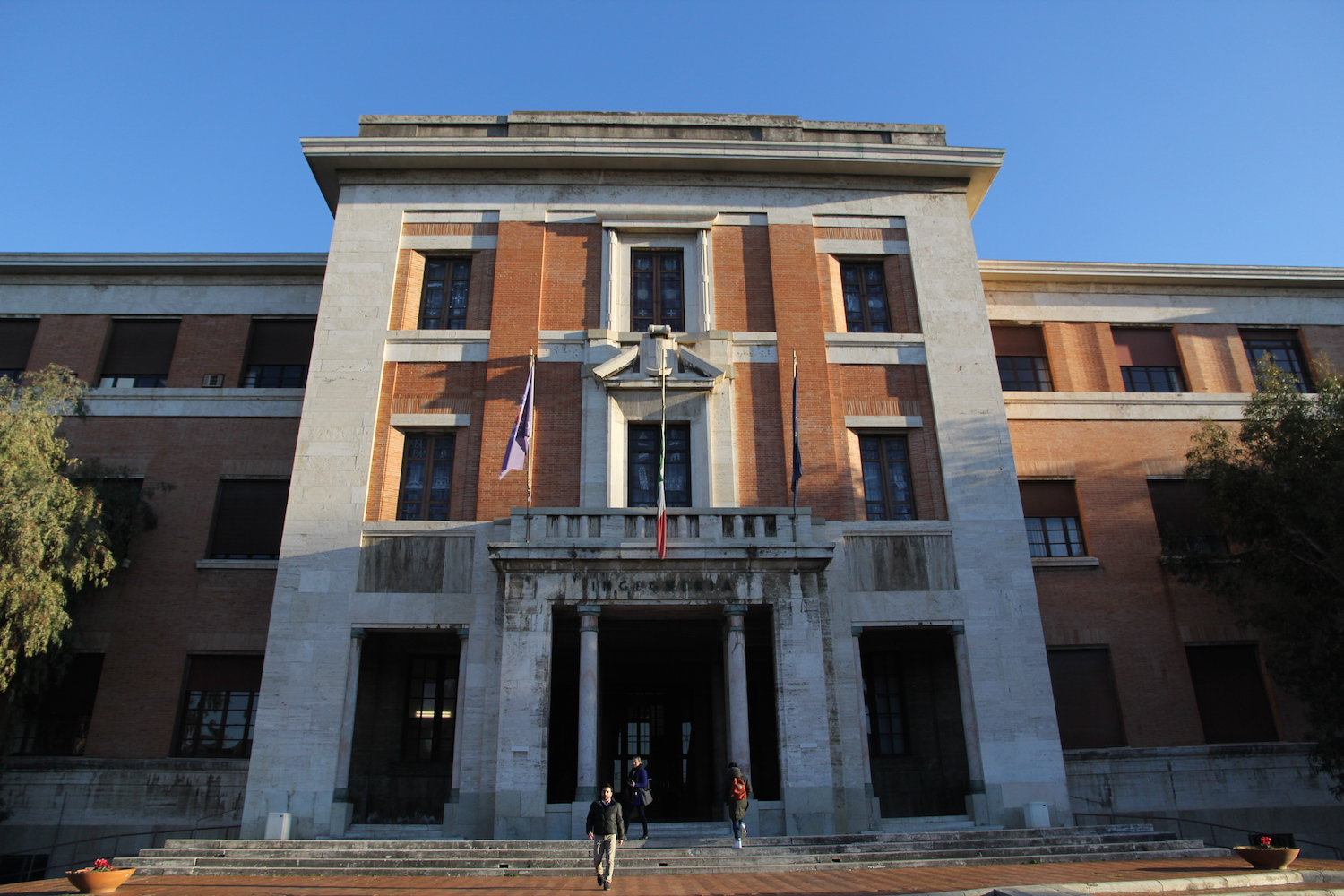
The Royal School of Engineering in Pisa

Notable works by Pera include:

- Master plan for Pisa and Marina di Pisa (1930)
- Casa dello Studente, Pisa (1932)
- New headquarters of the Royal School of Engineering, Pisa (1932–1937), with Federigo Severini
- Interventions to the church of Santo Stefano dei Cavalieri, Pisa (1935)
- Residential buildings in Livorno (1934)
- Villa Silicani in Querceto, Montecatini Val di Cecina (1937)
- Housing projects in San Giusto and Gagno, Pisa (1937–1938)
- Villa Jonasson in Pisa (1937–1938)
- Reconstruction and restoration of the church of Santa Maria Maddalena, Pisa (1946–1947)
- Banca Commerciale Italiana headquarters, Pisa
- Credito Italiano headquarters, Pisa (1951–1953)
- INA-Casa housing blocks, Volterra (1958)
- Civil Hospital of Santa Maria Maddalena, Volterra (1958)

== Sources ==
- Bracaloni, Federico; Dringoli, Massimo, eds. (2014). Luigi Pera. Opere e progetti. Pisa: Pacini.
- Insabato, Elisabetta; Cecilia Ghelli (2007). Guida agli archivi di architetti e ingegneri del Novecento in Toscana. Florence: Edifir. pp. 277–280.
- Rupi, Pier Lodovico; Martinelli, Andrea, eds. (1997). Pisa: storia urbanistica. Pisa: Pacini. p. 198.
