= Buriano =

Buriano may refer to:

- Buriano, Castiglione della Pescaia, a village in the province of Grosseto, Italy
- Buriano, Montecatini Val di Cecina, a village in the province of Pisa, Italy
- Buriano, Quarrata, a village in the province of Pistoia, Italy
