= Montanelli =

Montanelli may refer to:

== People ==
- Giuseppe Montanelli (1813–1862), Italian statesman and author
- Indro Montanelli (1909–2001), Italian journalist and author

== Places ==
- Montanelli, Palaia, a village in Tuscany
