= Toiano =

Toiano may refer to:

- Toiano, Palaia, a village in the province of Pisa, Italy
- Toiano, Pozzuoli, a village in the Metropolitan City of Naples, Italy
- Toiano, Sovicille, a village in the province of Siena, Italy
- Toiano, Vinci, a village in the Metropolitan City of Florence, Italy
