= Palaia =

- Comune
- Comune di Palaia
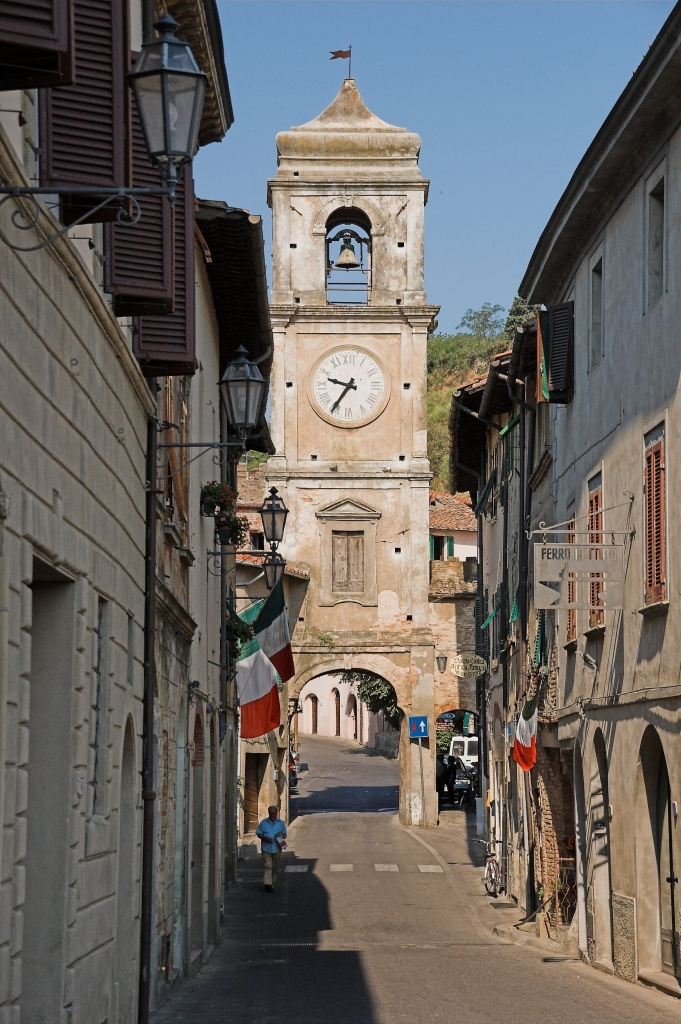
- Civic Tower.

- Coat of arms

- Location within Italy Location within Tuscany
- Coordinates: 43°36′N 10°45′E
- Country: Italy
- Region: Tuscany
- Province: Pisa (PI)
- Frazioni: Alica, Baccanella, Colleoli, Forcoli, Gello, Montacchita, Montanelli, Montechiari, Montefoscoli, Partino, San Gervasio, Toiano, Villa Saletta

Government
  - Mayor: Marco Gherardini

Area
  - Total: 73.71 km^{2} (28.46 sq mi)
- Elevation: 240 m (790 ft)

Population (31 December 2017)
  - Total: 4,542
  - Density: 61.62/km^{2} (159.6/sq mi)
- Demonym: Palaiesi
- Time zone: UTC+1 (CET)
  - Summer (DST): UTC+2 (CEST)
- Postal code: 56036
- Dialing code: 0587
- Website: Official website

Palaia is a comune (municipality) in the Province of Pisa in the Italian region Tuscany, located about 45 kilometres (28 mi) southwest of Florence and about 30 kilometres (19 mi) southeast of Pisa.

Palaia borders the following municipalities: Capannoli, Montaione, Montopoli in Val d'Arno, Peccioli, Pontedera, San Miniato.

== See also ==
- Bonamico, Italian wine grape that is also known as Uva di Palaia and may have originated in Palaia
