= Bonamico (grape) =

Variety of grape

Bonamico is a red Italian wine grape variety that is grown in the province of Pisa in Tuscany where the grape has a reputation for producing very high yields. Some ampelographers speculate that the grape may have originated around the town of Palaia with the grape being known under the synonym of Uva di Palaia. While often used as a table grape, Bonamico can be a minor blending component in several Tuscan Denominazione di Origine Controllata (DOC) and Indicazione Geografica Tipica (IGT) wines where it often contributes floral aroma notes and acidity.

== History ==
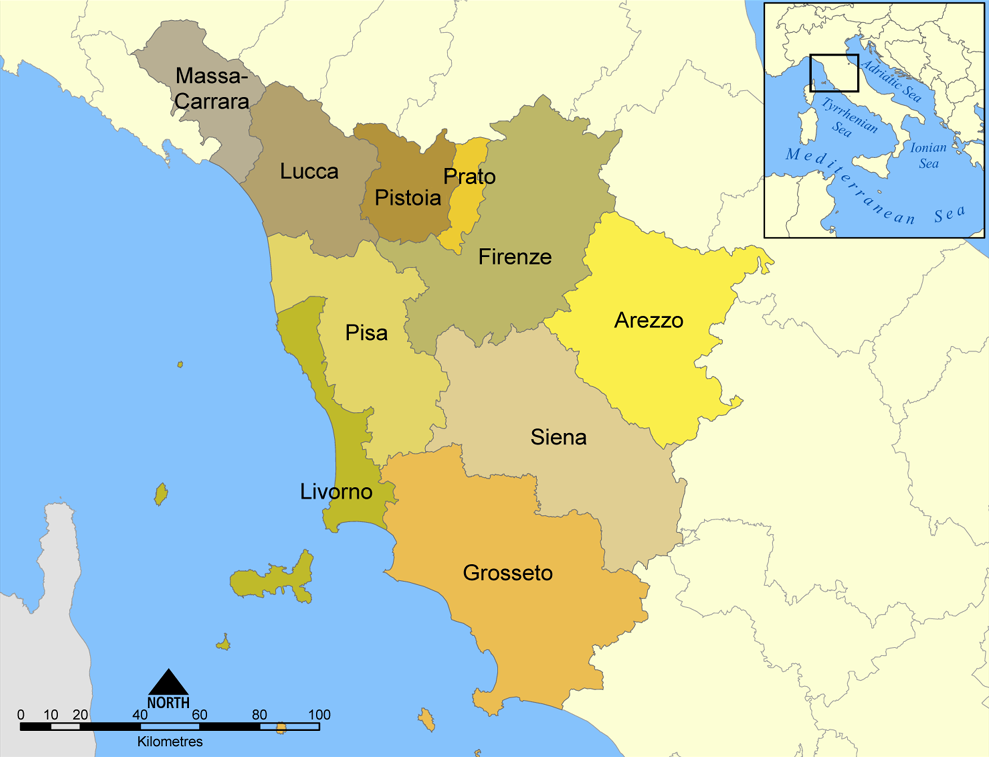
Bonamico is mostly found in the provinces of Lucca, Pisa and Pistoia.

Bonamico has been historically grown across Tuscany but following World War II and the post-war economic turmoil of the 1950s and 1960s, plantings of the grape sharply declined and it is now mostly found in the provinces of Pisa, Pistoia and Lucca where it is also used as a table grape.

== Viticulture ==
The name "Bonamico" is derived from the Italian term for "good friend" which ampelographers believe may be a reference to the grape's propensity to produce bountiful yields. However, these high yields coupled with Bonamico being a late ripening variety meant that the grape often produced off balanced wines with high acidity levels, unripe tannins and low alcohol levels.

== Wine regions ==
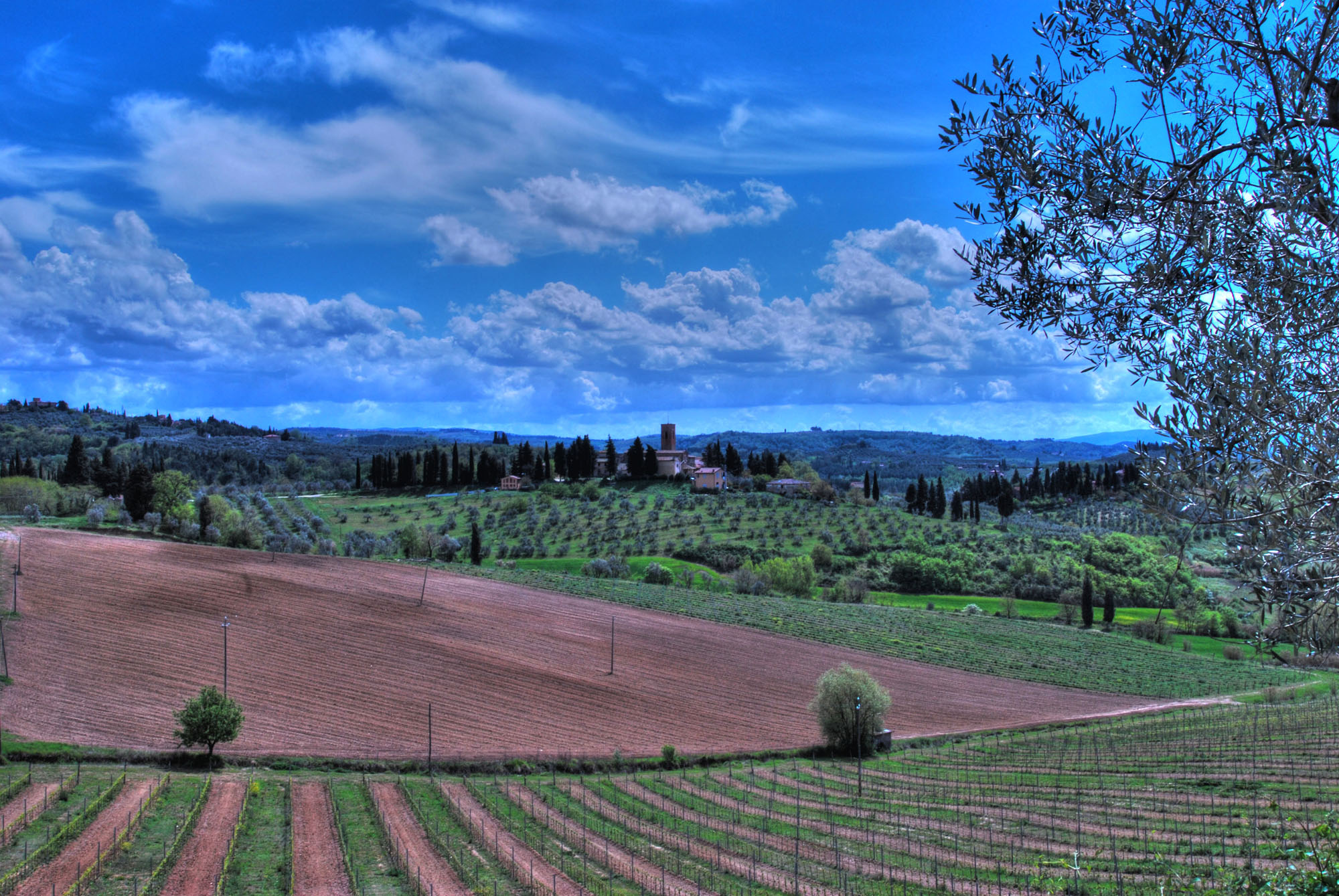
Bonamico is found almost exclusively in Tuscany where the grape can benefit from a long growing season.

In 2000, there were 100 hectares (250 acres) of Bonamico in cultivation, mostly in the province of Pisa and in the provinces of Lucca and Pistoia.

== Styles ==
According to Master of Wine Jancis Robinson, if yields are kept in check and the grape is allowed a long growing season to fully ripen before harvest, Bonamico has the potential to make medium bodied wines with good acidity levels and floral aromatics.

== Synonyms ==
Over the years, Bonamico has been known under a variety of synonyms including: Buenamico, Buon Amico, Buonamico, Canaiolo Romano, Ceragia, Dorace, Durace, Giacomino, Neret, Neyret, Pulera, Sangioveto, Tinto, Uva di Palaia and Uva Rosa.
