= Montacchita =

- Frazione
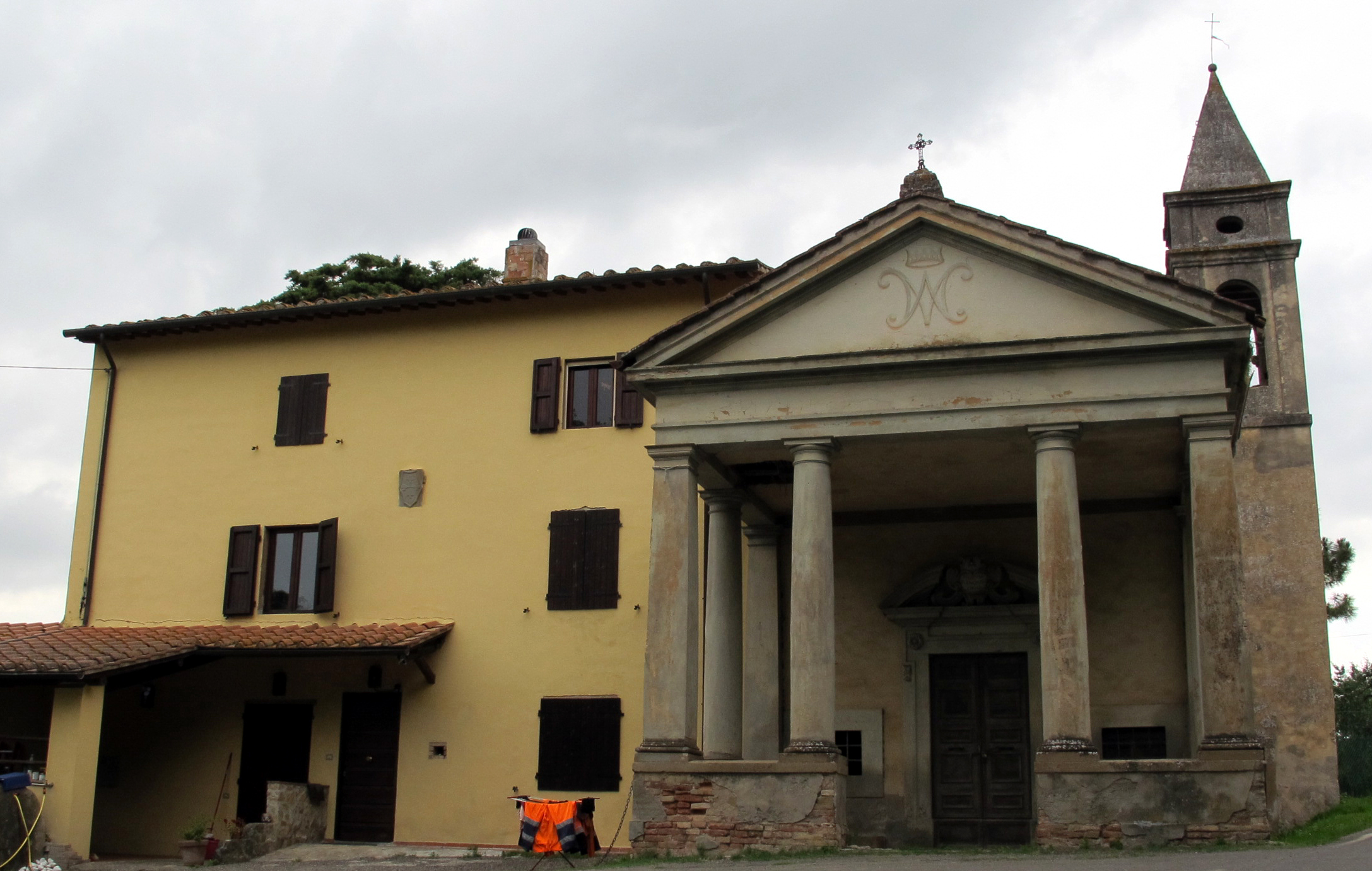
- The church of Madonna della Neve

- Location of Montacchita in Italy
- Coordinates: 43°36′36″N 10°42′7″E
- Country: Italy
- Region: Tuscany
- Province: Pisa (PI)
- Comune: Palaia
- Elevation: 178 m (584 ft)

Population (2011)
  - Total: 80
- Time zone: UTC+1 (CET)
  - Summer (DST): UTC+2 (CEST)
- Postal code: 56036
- Dialing code: (+39) 0587

Montacchita is a village in Tuscany, central Italy, administratively a frazione of the comune of Palaia, province of Pisa.

Montacchita is about 40 km from Pisa and 8 km from Palaia.

== Bibliography ==
- Caciagli, Giuseppe (1972). Pisa e la sua provincia. Vol. 2. Pisa: Colombo Cursi Editore. p. 725.
- Ciampoltrini, Giulio (2006). Gli Etruschi della Valdera. Forme dell'insediamento fra VII e VI secolo a.C. Quaderni Rete Museale Valdera. Pisa: Felici Editore.
