= Montefoscoli =

- Frazione
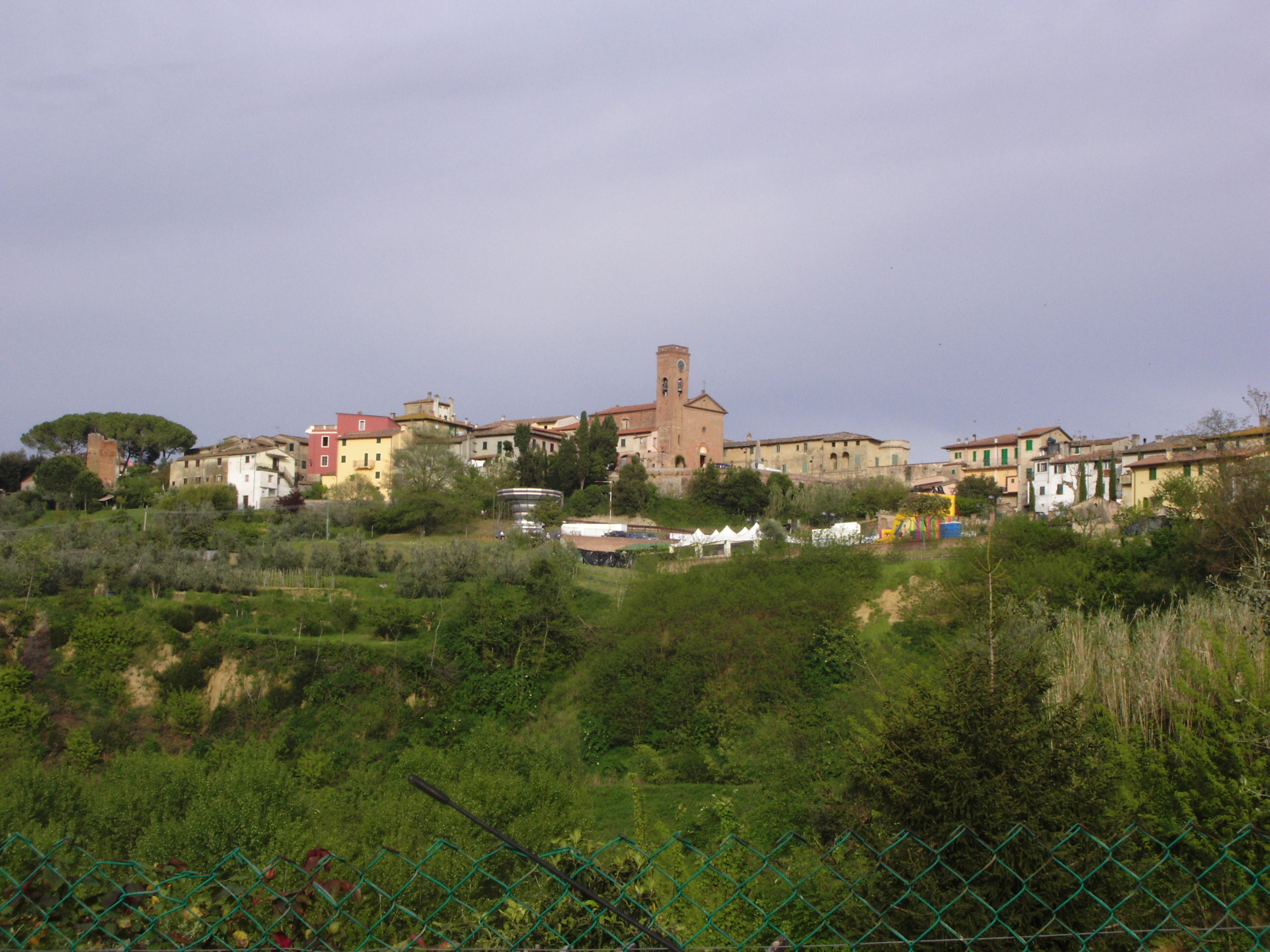

- Location of Montefoscoli in Italy
- Coordinates: 43°34′37″N 10°45′15″E
- Country: Italy
- Region: Tuscany
- Province: Pisa (PI)
- Comune: Palaia
- Elevation: 182 m (597 ft)

Population (2011)
  - Total: 489
- Demonym: Montefoscolesi
- Time zone: UTC+1 (CET)
  - Summer (DST): UTC+2 (CEST)
- Postal code: 56036
- Dialing code: (+39) 0587

Montefoscoli is a village in Tuscany, central Italy, administratively a frazione of the comune of Palaia, province of Pisa. At the time of the 2001 census its population was 529.

Montefoscoli is about 42 km from Pisa and 5 km from Palaia.
