= Jello (disambiguation) =

Jell-O is a brand name for a fruit-flavored gelatin.

Jello may refer to:

== In music ==
- Jello Biafra (born 1958), American lead singer and songwriter for the San Francisco punk rock band Dead Kennedys
- Jello, a stage name of Darrell Fitton (fl. 1994-present), English electronic musician
- "Jello" (song), by Asian-American hip hop group Far East Movement
- "Jello", a song by Brockhampton from Saturation II
- "Swimming in Jello", an album by Judy Pancoast

== Other uses ==
- Jello Shoecompany, an Austrian shoe retailer
- Jello Tower, a rock formation in Arches National Park, USA
- "Jello", original title of "Alpine Shepherd Boy", an episode of the TV series Better Call Saul

== See also ==
- The Jell-O Belt, a colloquial geographical term in American English for the Mormon Corridor
- Sphyraena jello the pickhandle barracuda
- Jello Jello, a mountain in the Andes in Peru
