= Altopascio =

- Comune
- Comune di Altopascio
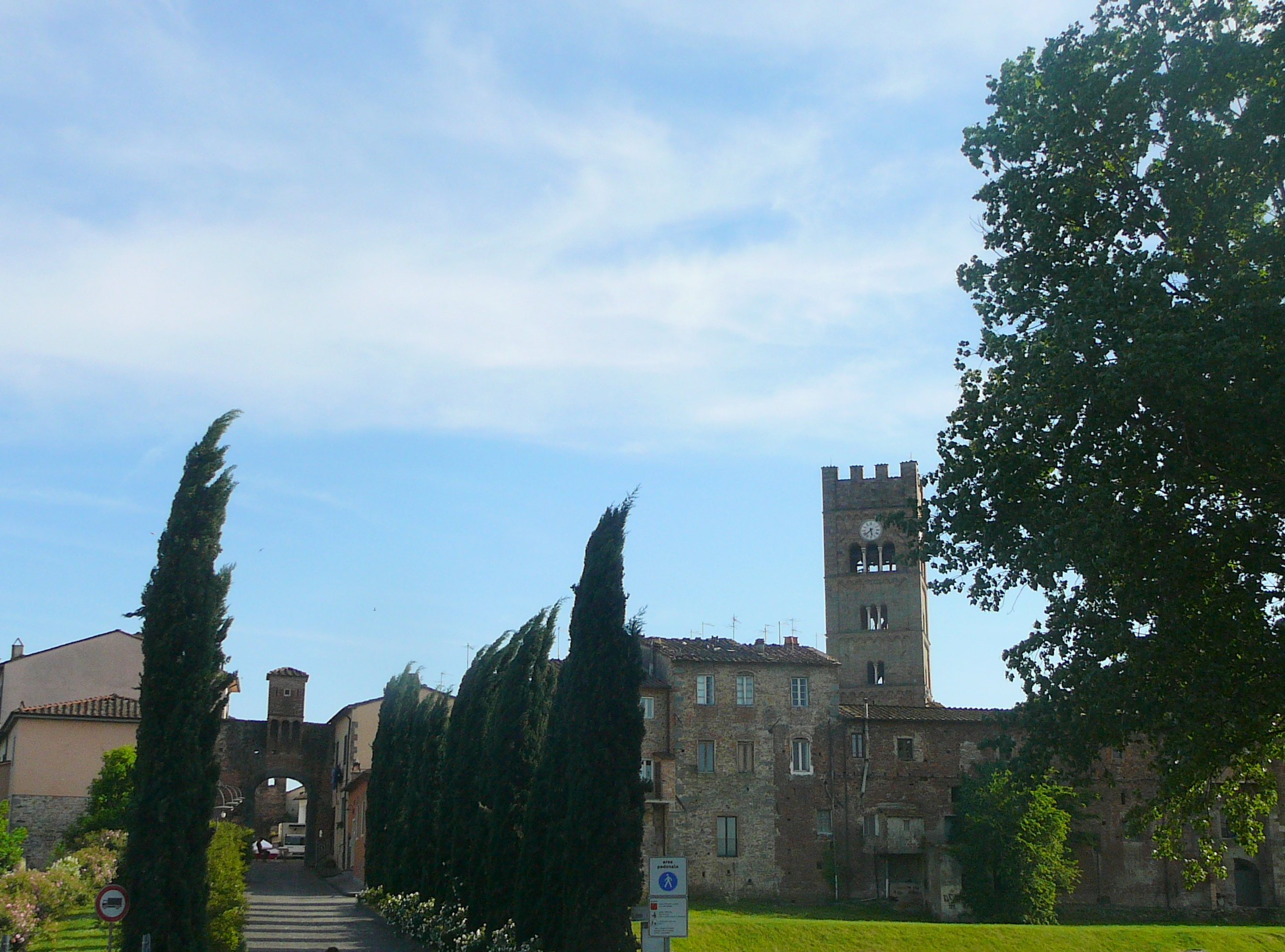
- Church of San Jacopo Maggiore

- Location within Italy Location within Tuscany
- Coordinates: 43°49′N 10°41′E
- Country: Italy
- Region: Tuscany
- Province: Lucca (LU)
- Frazioni: Badia Pozzeveri, Marginone, Spianate

Government
  - Mayor: Sara D'Ambrosio

Area
  - Total: 28 km^{2} (11 sq mi)
- Elevation: 19 m (62 ft)

Population (31 December 2017)
  - Total: 15,572
  - Density: 560/km^{2} (1,400/sq mi)
- Demonym: Altopascesi
- Time zone: UTC+1 (CET)
  - Summer (DST): UTC+2 (CEST)
- Postal code: 55011
- Dialing code: 0583
- Patron saint: St. Jacopo
- Saint day: July 25

Altopascio is a comune (municipality) in the province of Lucca, in the Italian region of Tuscany, with a population of 15,572.

== History ==
Already inhabited in Roman times, Altopascio gained in importance due to its Spedale (hostel, first mentioned in 1084) for the pilgrims who travelled on the Via Francigena, leading from France to Rome. This formed the basis of the later Order of Saint James of Altopascio. This, founded by Matilda of Canossa between 1070 and 1080, was one of the first of the military orders; it existed for four hundred years, in which it had considerable social, political and military influence, and though gaining land in various European countries retained its strong ties to the town where it was founded.

It is famous for the Battle of Altopascio in 1325 in which the Ghibelline leader Castruccio Castracani defeated the Florentines Guelphs led by Ramón de Cardona. Thanks to his victory, he became duke of Lucca.

The Spedale declined starting from the 16th century, until Grand Duke Peter Leopold suppressed it in 1773, to favour that in Pescia.

== Main sights ==
- Badia (abbey) of St. Peter, known from 1039. It was held by the Benedictines from 1086 and then by the Camaldolese from 1103. It reached its maximum splendour in the later 13th century, but by the Battle of Altopascio (1325) it began to decline, and was abandoned in 1408. Of the medieval original structure, only the exterior of the apse remains.
- Church of Santi Jacopo, Cristoforo and Eligio (best known as San Jacopo Maggiore), annexed to the Spedale. It was a medieval hospital complex, of which the cloister, the bell tower and parts (façade and apse area) of the Romanesque church.

== Sister cities ==
- El Perelló, Spain
- Saint-Gilles, France
