= Federigo Severini =

Italian engineer and architect (1888–1962)

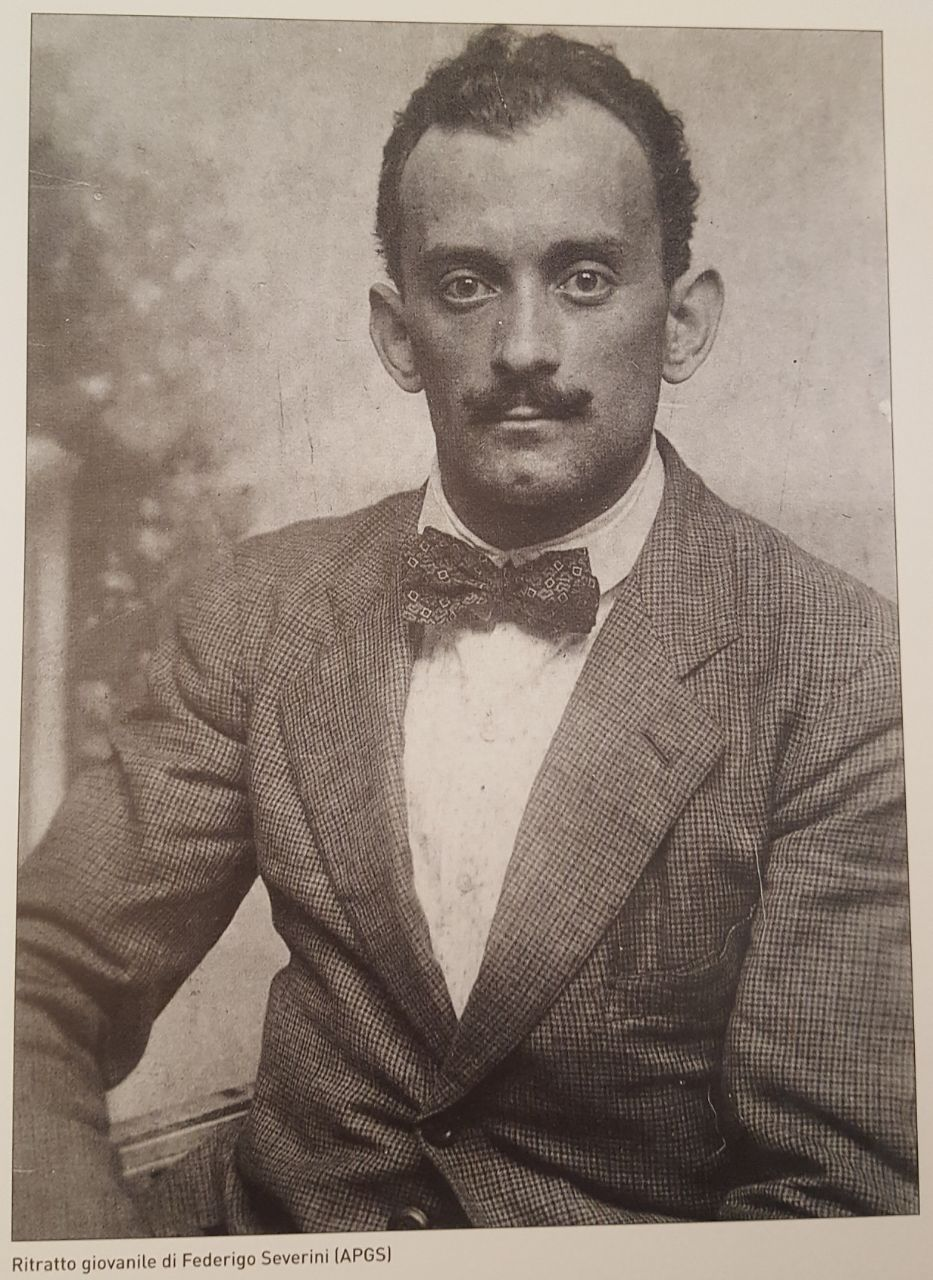
- Severini in the 1910s
- Born: 31 March 1888; Pisa, Kingdom of Italy
- Died: 12 October 1962 (aged 74); Pisa, Italy
- Occupations: Civil engineer, architect, painter

Federigo Severini (31 March 1888 – 12 October 1962) was an Italian engineer, architect and painter active primarily in his native Tuscany. He is known for major public buildings in Pisa during the interwar period and for his role in the development of Tirrenia.

== Life ==
Graduated in civil engineering from the University of Rome in 1912, Severini began his career in academic collaboration with Vincenzo Pilotti before establishing his own practice in 1921 jointly with Giulio Buoncristiani. During the interwar period he designed major public buildings in Pisa and numerous residential and tourist structures along the Tyrrhenian coast. In 1933, he won the competition for the master plan of Tirrenia, for which he designed several buildings during the following decade. After World War II he resumed academic activity at the University of Pisa, where he taught from 1949 to 1958.

== Selected works ==
Notable works by Severini include:

- Pisa Post Office building (1924–1929)
- Interior renovation of Palazzo Vincenti, Pisa (c. 1930)
- Palazzo della Provincia di Pisa, Piazza Vittorio Emanuele (1933–1935)
- Master plan of Tirrenia (1933)
- New headquarters of the Royal School of Engineering, Pisa (1932–1937), with Luigi Pera
- Residential and public buildings for the Ente Autonomo Tirrenia (1930s)
- Putti Orthopedic Clinic, Pisa (1935)
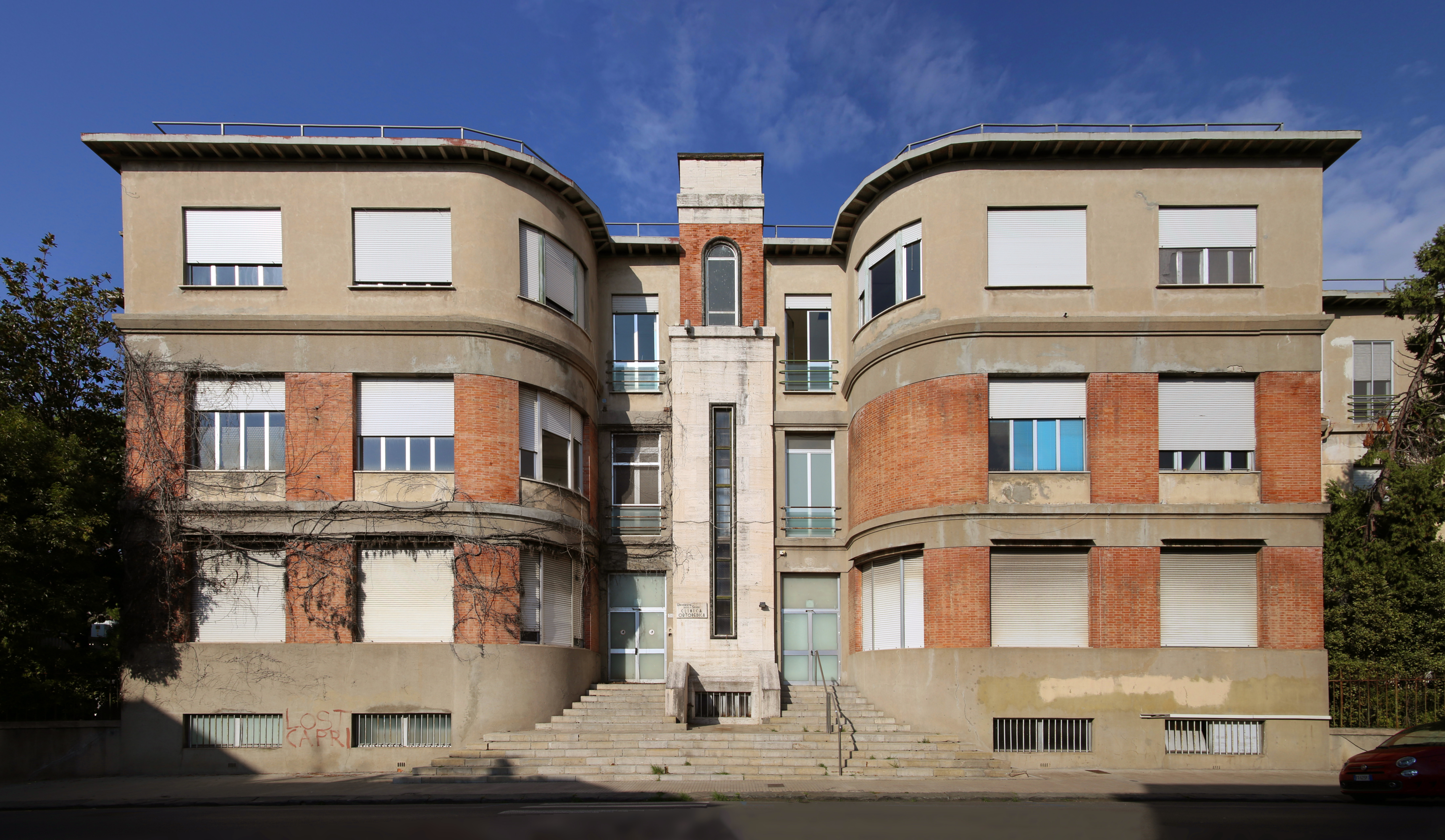
Putti Orthopedic Clinic

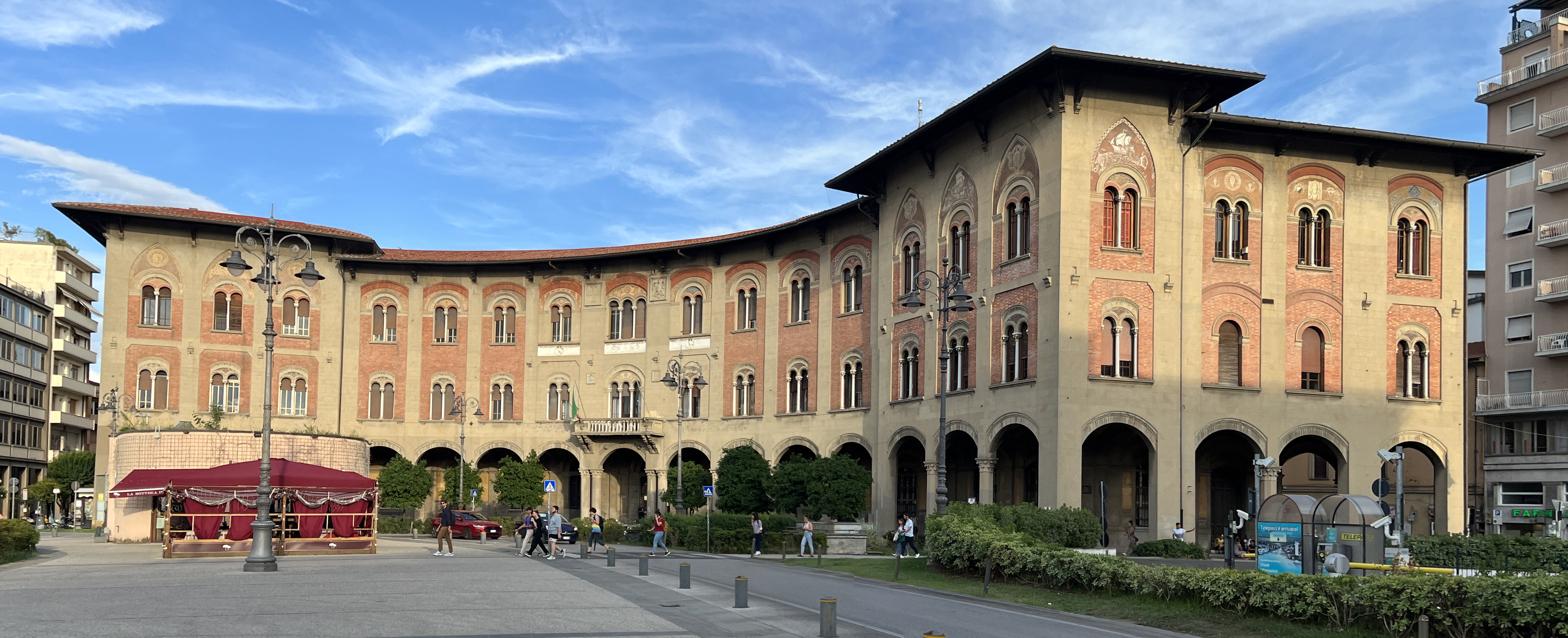
Pisa Post Office

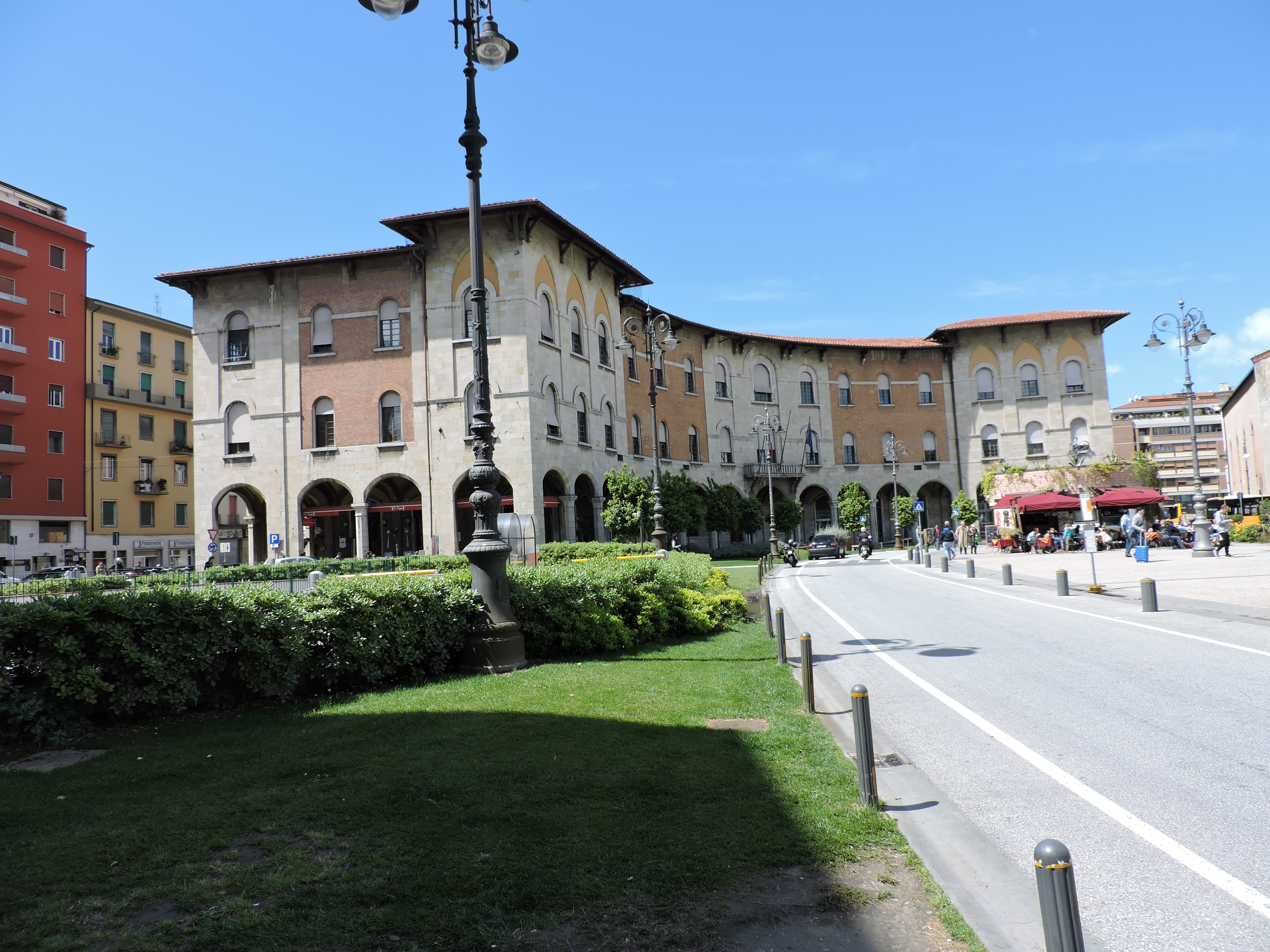
Palazzo della Provincia di Pisa

== Sources ==
- Federigo Severini 1888–1962. Verona: Grafiche Signoretti. 1988.
- Bossaglia, Rossana; Cozzi, Marco (1982). I Coppedè. Genova: Sagep. p. 150.
- Bracaloni, Federico; Dringoli, Massimo, eds. (2011). Federigo Severini. Opere e progetti. Pisa: Pacini.
- Insabato, Elisabetta; Ghelli, Cecilia, eds. (2007). Guida agli archivi di architetti e ingegneri del Novecento in Toscana. Florence: Edifir. pp. 339–342.
