= Alica, Palaia =

Alica
- Frazione
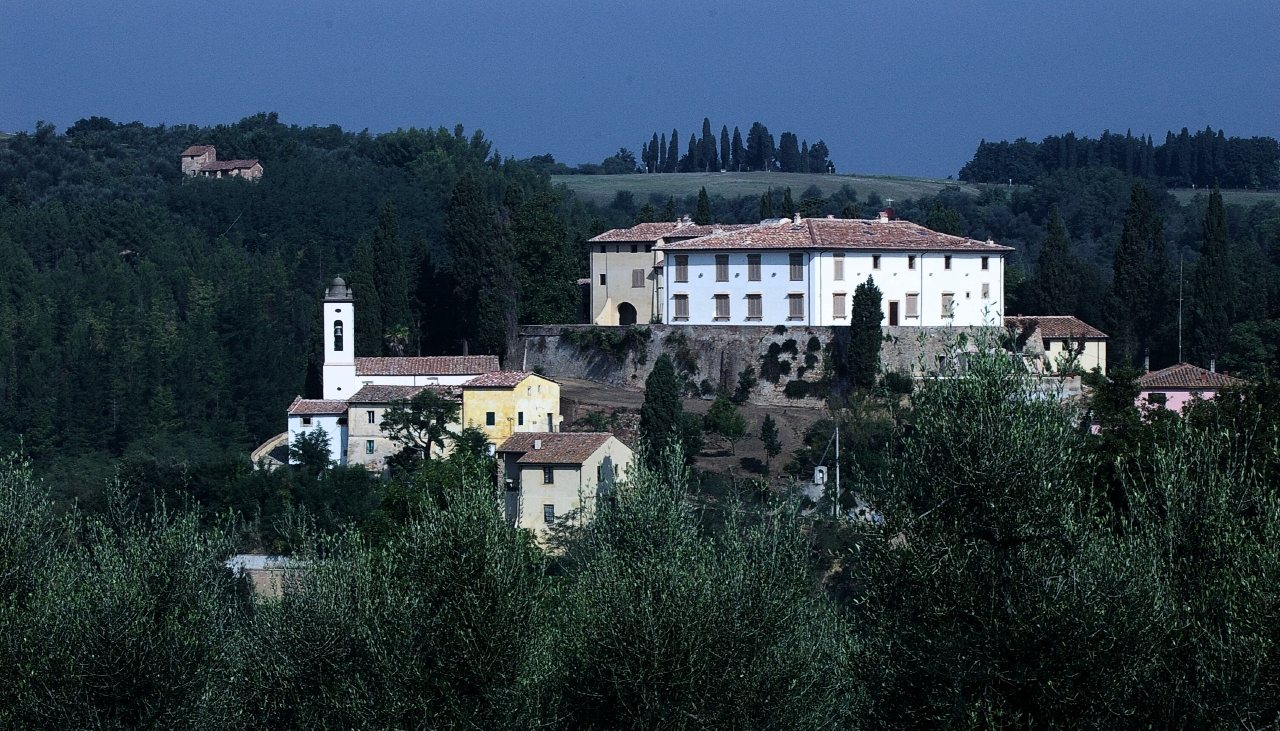

- Location of Alica in Italy
- Coordinates: 43°35′54″N 10°43′26″E
- Country: Italy
- Region: Tuscany
- Province: Pisa (PI)
- Comune: Palaia
- Elevation: 85 m (279 ft)

Population (2011)
  - Total: 21
- Demonym: Alichesi
- Time zone: UTC+1 (CET)
  - Summer (DST): UTC+2 (CEST)
- Postal code: 56036
- Dialing code: (+39) 0587

Alica is a village in Tuscany, central Italy, administratively a frazione of the comune of Palaia, province of Pisa.

Alica is about 38 km (24 mi) from Pisa and 8 km (5.0 mi) from Palaia.

== Bibliography ==
- Caciagli, Giuseppe (1972). Pisa e la sua provincia. Vol. 2. Pisa: Colombo Cursi Editore. pp. 716–717.
