= Casaglia, Montecatini Val di Cecina =

Casaglia
- Frazione
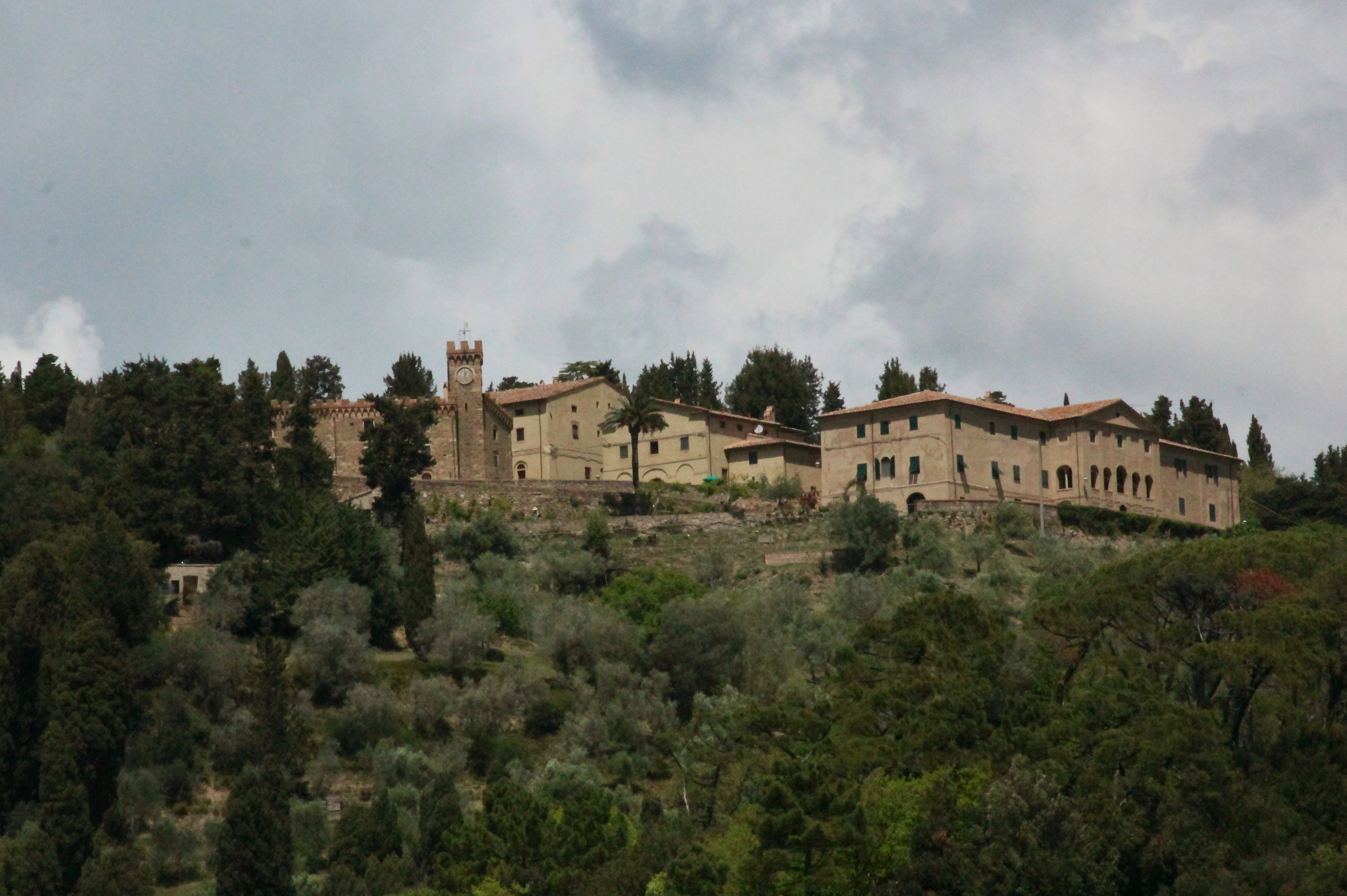

- Location of Casaglia in Italy
- Coordinates: 43°21′1″N 10°39′48″E
- Country: Italy
- Region: Tuscany
- Province: Pisa (PI)
- Comune: Montecatini Val di Cecina
- Elevation: 130 m (430 ft)

Population (2011)
  - Total: 12
- Time zone: UTC+1 (CET)
  - Summer (DST): UTC+2 (CEST)
- Postal code: 56040
- Dialing code: (+39) 0588

Casaglia is a village in Tuscany, central Italy, administratively a frazione of the comune of Montecatini Val di Cecina, province of Pisa. At the time of the 2001 census its population was 10.

Casaglia is about 70 km from Pisa and 20 km from Montecatini Val di Cecina.
