= Miemo =

- Frazione
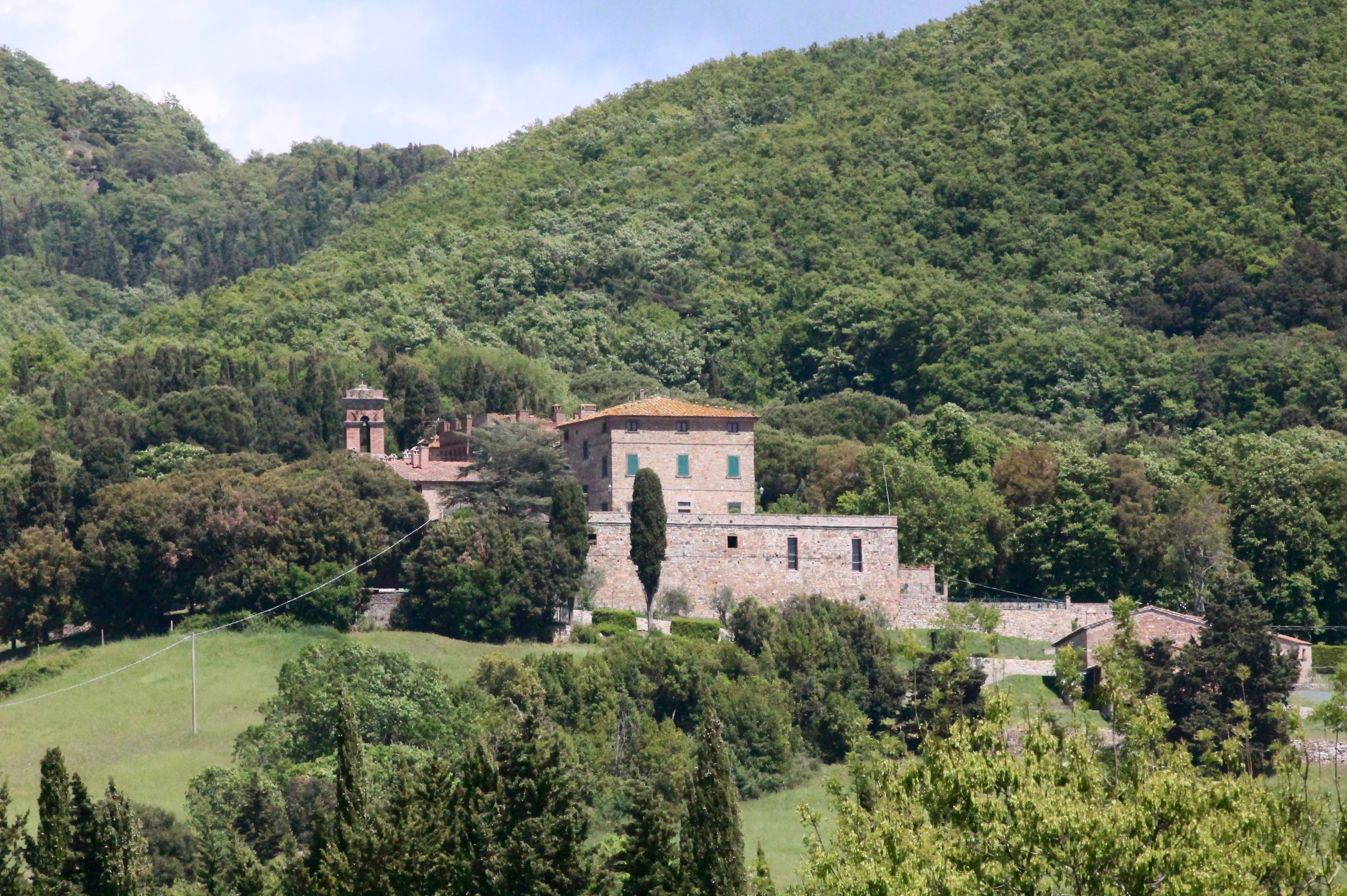

- Location of Miemo in Italy
- Coordinates: 43°24′34″N 10°40′12″E
- Country: Italy
- Region: Tuscany
- Province: Pisa (PI)
- Comune: Montecatini Val di Cecina
- Elevation: 416 m (1,365 ft)

Population (2011)
  - Total: 13
- Time zone: UTC+1 (CET)
  - Summer (DST): UTC+2 (CEST)
- Postal code: 56040
- Dialing code: (+39) 0588

Miemo is a village in Tuscany, central Italy, administratively a frazione of the comune of Montecatini Val di Cecina, province of Pisa. At the time of the 2001 census its population was 13.

Miemo is about 60 km from Pisa and 26 km from Montecatini Val di Cecina.
