= Baccanella =

- Frazione
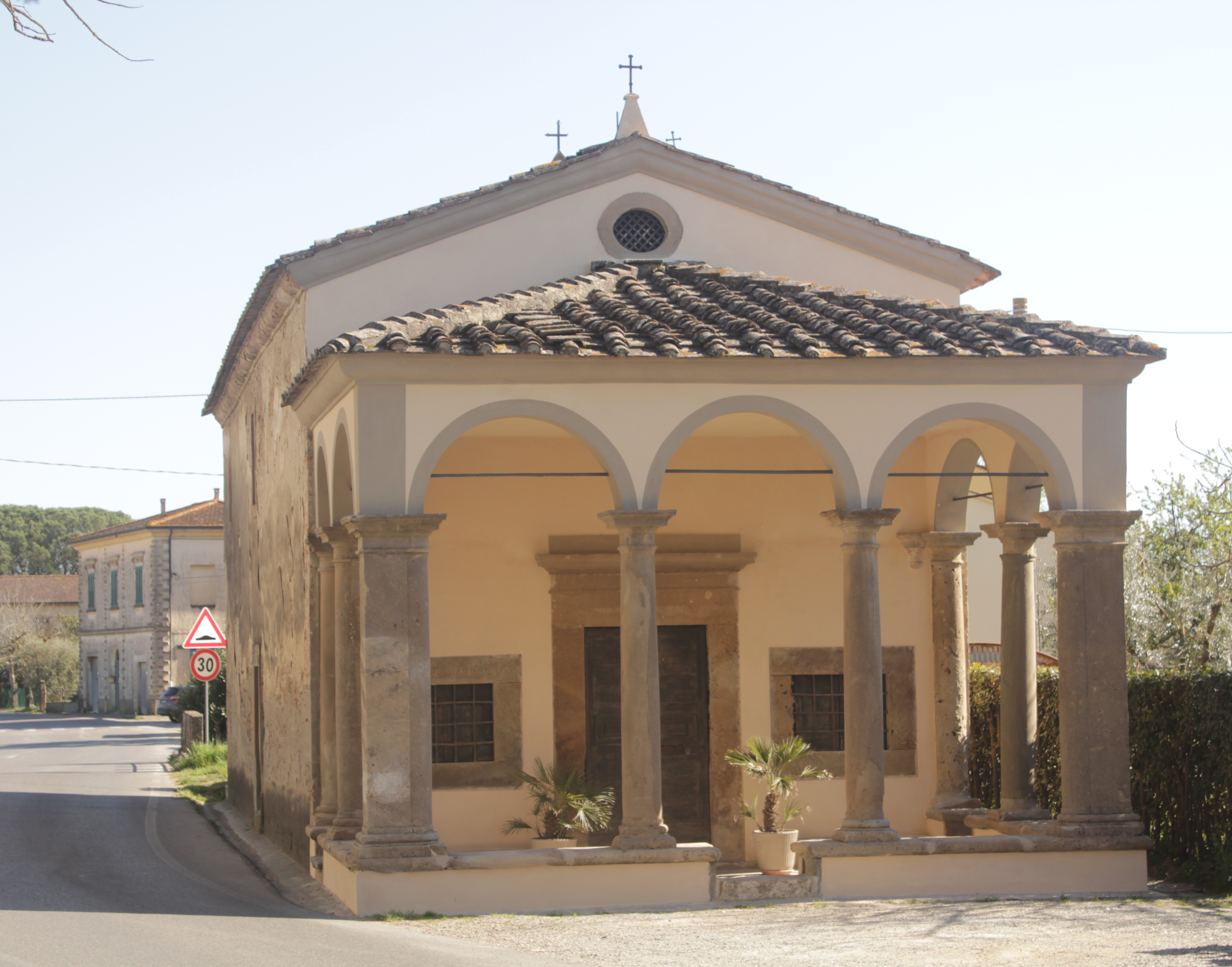
- The church of Santa Maria delle Grazie in Baccanella

- Location of Baccanella in Italy
- Coordinates: 43°35′53″N 10°42′52″E
- Country: Italy
- Region: Tuscany
- Province: Pisa (PI)
- Comune: Palaia
- Elevation: 38 m (125 ft)

Population (2011)
  - Total: 226
- Time zone: UTC+1 (CET)
  - Summer (DST): UTC+2 (CEST)
- Postal code: 56036
- Dialing code: (+39) 0587

Baccanella is a village in Tuscany, central Italy, administratively a frazione of the comune of Palaia, province of Pisa. At the time of the 2001 census its population was 138.

Baccanella is about 40 km (25 mi) from Pisa and 7 km (4.3 mi) from Palaia.
