= Partino =

- Frazione
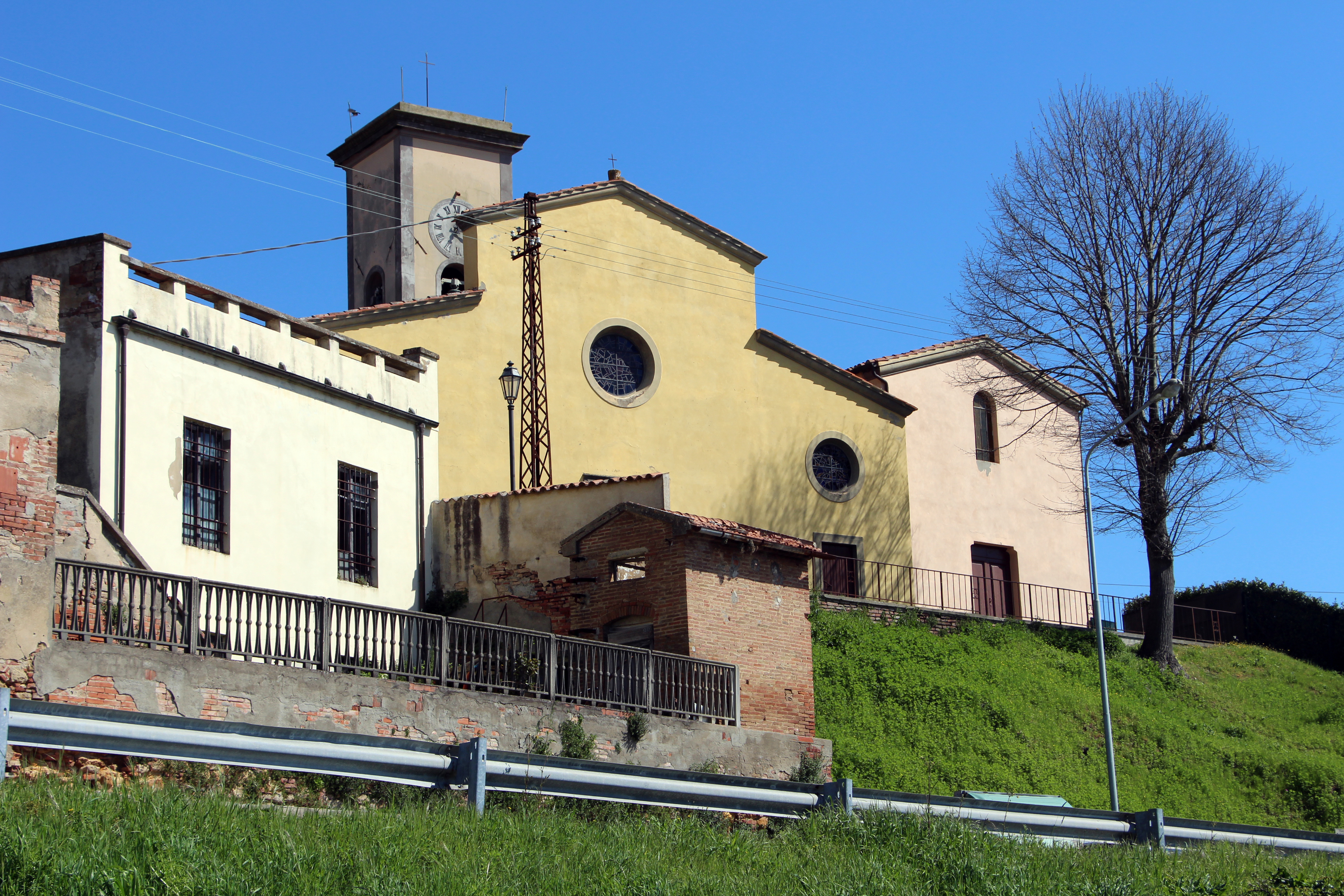
- The church of Santa Maria Assunta

- Location of Partino in Italy
- Coordinates: 43°36′2″N 10°45′2″E
- Country: Italy
- Region: Tuscany
- Province: Pisa (PI)
- Comune: Palaia
- Elevation: 190 m (620 ft)

Population (2011)
  - Total: 159
- Demonym: Partinesi
- Time zone: UTC+1 (CET)
  - Summer (DST): UTC+2 (CEST)
- Postal code: 56036
- Dialing code: (+39) 0587

Partino is a village in Tuscany, central Italy, administratively a frazione of the comune of Palaia, province of Pisa. At the time of the 2001 census its population was 209.

Partino is about 42 km from Pisa and 2 km from Palaia.
