= La Sassa =

- Frazione
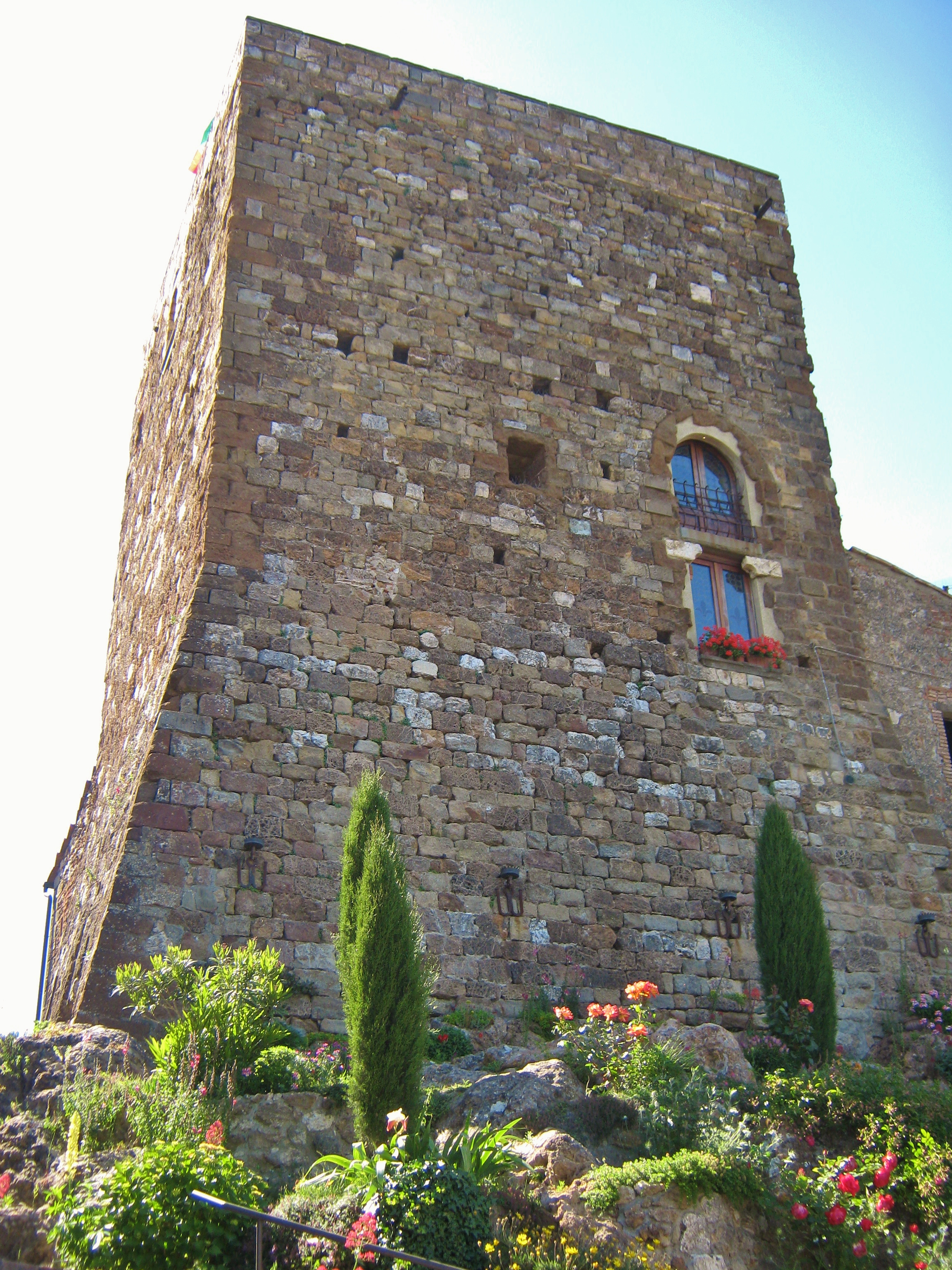
- The tower of Sassa

- Location of La Sassa in Italy
- Coordinates: 43°15′30″N 10°41′15″E
- Country: Italy
- Region: Tuscany
- Province: Pisa (PI)
- Comune: Montecatini Val di Cecina
- Elevation: 390 m (1,280 ft)

Population (2001)
  - Total: 152
- Time zone: UTC+1 (CET)
  - Summer (DST): UTC+2 (CEST)
- Postal code: 56040
- Dialing code: (+39) 0588

La Sassa, or simply Sassa, is a village in Tuscany, central Italy, administratively a frazione of the comune of Montecatini Val di Cecina, province of Pisa. At the time of the 2001 census its population was 152.

La Sassa is about 80 km from Pisa and 30 km from Montecatini Val di Cecina.
