= Colleoli =

- Frazione
- Location of Colleoli in Italy
- Coordinates: 43°37′10″N 10°45′32″E
- Country: Italy
- Region: Tuscany
- Province: Pisa (PI)
- Comune: Palaia
- Elevation: 160 m (520 ft)
- Demonym: Colleolesi
- Time zone: UTC+1 (CET)
  - Summer (DST): UTC+2 (CEST)
- Postal code: 56036
- Dialing code: (+39) 0587

Colleoli is a village in Tuscany, central Italy, administratively a frazione of the comune of Palaia, province of Pisa.

Colleoli is about 40 km from Pisa and 2 km from Palaia.

== Bibliography ==
- Caciagli, Giuseppe (1972). Pisa e la sua provincia. Vol. 2. Pisa: Colombo Cursi Editore. pp. 720–721.
