= Villa Saletta =

- Frazione
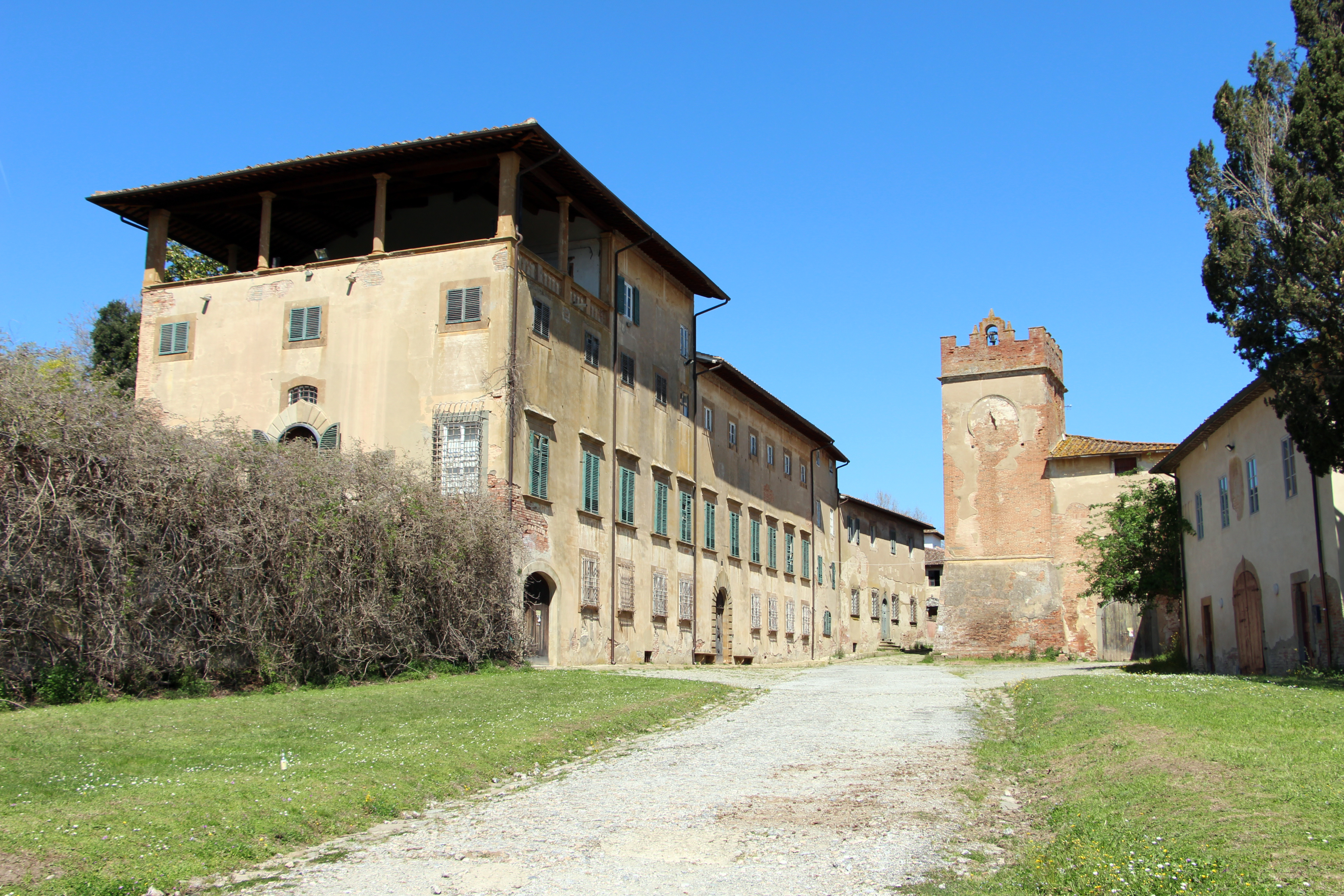

- Location of Villa Saletta in Italy
- Coordinates: 43°35′45″N 10°44′4″E
- Country: Italy
- Region: Tuscany
- Province: Pisa (PI)
- Comune: Palaia
- Elevation: 130 m (430 ft)
- Demonym: Villesi
- Time zone: UTC+1 (CET)
  - Summer (DST): UTC+2 (CEST)
- Postal code: 56036
- Dialing code: (+39) 0587

Villa Saletta is a village in Tuscany, central Italy, administratively a frazione of the comune of Palaia, province of Pisa.

Villa Saletta is about 40 km from Pisa and 5 km from Palaia. The village was first recorded in 980 and flourished during the 15th century.

== Economics ==
The 1,760-acre Villa Saletta estate and winery has been operating since the Middle Ages and was once owned by the Medici family's personal bankers. Villa Saletta produces "Super Tuscan" wine. It's a fruit-flavored wine consisting of Merlot, Cabernet Sauvignon, and Cabernet Franc grapes that must be grown in extreme, dry heat. The winery produces 50,000 bottles and has won several awards, including 3rd place in the London Wine Competition.

== Cinema ==
The films The Night of the Shooting Stars and Fiorile by the Taviani brothers, as well as Napoleon and Me by Paolo Virzì, were filmed at the Villa Saletta estate.

== Bibliography ==
- Caciagli, Giuseppe (1972). Pisa e la sua provincia. Vol. 2. Pisa: Colombo Cursi Editore. pp. 737–738.
