= Montecatini Val di Cecina =

- Comune
- Comune di Montecatini Val di Cecina
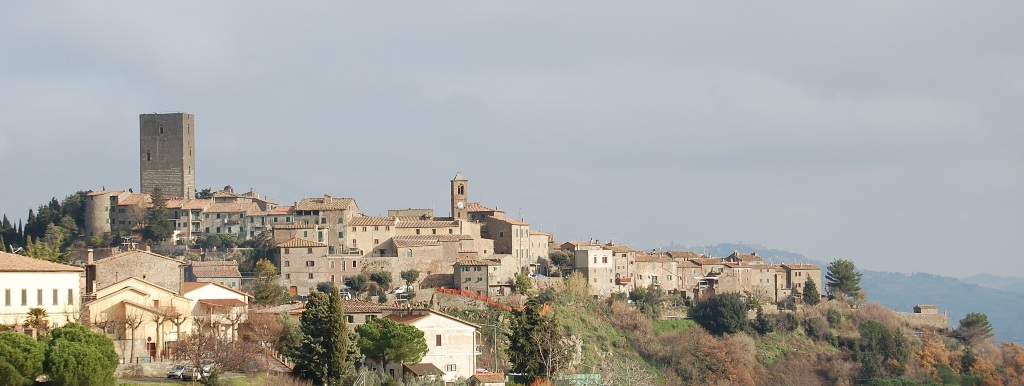

- Coat of arms

- Location within Italy Location within Tuscany
- Coordinates: 43°23′37″N 10°45′0″E
- Country: Italy
- Region: Tuscany
- Province: Pisa (PI)
- Frazioni: Buriano, Casaglia, Casino di Terra, Gello, La Sassa, Miemo, Ponteginori, Querceto

Government
  - Mayor: Sandro Cerri (since April 2008)

Area
  - Total: 155.19 km^{2} (59.92 sq mi)
- Elevation: 416 m (1,365 ft)

Population (2014)
  - Total: 1,768
  - Density: 11.39/km^{2} (29.51/sq mi)
- Demonym: Montecatinesi
- Time zone: UTC+1 (CET)
  - Summer (DST): UTC+2 (CEST)
- Postal code: 56040
- Dialing code: 0588
- Patron saint: St. Blaise
- Saint day: February 3
- Website: www.comune.montecatini.pi.it

Montecatini Val di Cecina is a small hilltown and comune in the province of Pisa in Tuscany (central Italy). Located approximately 60 kilometres (37 miles) south of Pisa, the medieval town sits on the Poggio la Croce hill overlooking the Cecina Valley and the larger hilltown of Volterra, which lies just 15 km (9 miles) away.

Local agriculture and the old copper mine provided Montecatini Val di Cecina with a degree of prosperity in the early Middle Ages. Like many Tuscan hilltop towns, its medieval aspect has been preserved precisely because lack of economic development. Today, Montecatini Val di Cecina is enjoying a small economic revival through tourism though on a modest scale.

== Economy ==
=== The mines ===
Since the Etruscan, the history of Montecatini Val di cecina is closely related with its copper mine which remained operational until 1907 and it is now converted to a museum. The town has given name to one of the biggest mining industries in Europe in the early 20th century, the Montecatini - General Society for the Mining and Chemical Industry (Italian Montecatini - Società Generale per l'Industria Mineraria e Chimica), which later merged in the more famous Montedison. Other subsoil resources in the area were salt, alabaster, chalcedony, lignite and geothermal energy.

== History ==
Montecatini Val di Cecina was first settled by ancient Etruscans, who populated the nearby city of Volterra. Later it served as a Roman look-out post as it overlooks what was a busy Roman road. The castle and tower that dominate the town were built in the Middle Ages by Filippo Belforti, whose family ruled the territory for about a century. By the 11th century, Montecatini Val di Cecina was in the Catholic parish administered from nearby Gabretto. In 1351, the area came under the rule of the Bishop of Volterra. In 1452, it was absorbed into the Republic of Florence (later Grand Duchy of Tuscany), to which it belonged until the unification of Italy in 1861.

== Main sights ==
Inside the village walls, which feature cylindrical towers around the perimeter, medieval buildings are tightly spaced, separated by narrow streets or alleys, and a few small piazzas. The town is dominated by the Belforti tower.

Other buildings include the Palazzo Pretorio, with an elegant porch that runs underneath a cross-ribbed vaulted roof supported by six Ionian columns, and San Biagio built in the romanesque - gothic style during the 14th Century. The church has an asymmetrical shape with a very plain portal facing a side street. The church is divided by a central nave with two side aisles separated by columns.

Nearby there is the frazione (village) of Querceto, with the Romanesque parish church Chiesa San Giovanni.

A fortified tower is on a hill offering a view of the country stretching toward Volterra and the Tyrrhenian Sea, is the village of La Sassa. An old copper mine lies between two other old villages, Casaglia and Gello.
