= Forcoli =

- Frazione
- Location of Forcoli in Italy
- Coordinates: 43°36′17″N 10°42′11″E
- Country: Italy
- Region: Tuscany
- Province: Pisa (PI)
- Comune: Palaia
- Elevation: 45 m (148 ft)

Population (2011)
  - Total: 1,780
- Time zone: UTC+1 (CET)
  - Summer (DST): UTC+2 (CEST)
- Postal code: 56036
- Dialing code: (+39) 0587

Forcoli is a village in Tuscany, central Italy, administratively a frazione of the comune of Palaia, province of Pisa. At the time of the 2001 census its population was 1,701.

Forcoli is about 40 km from Pisa and 7 km from Palaia.
