= San Gervasio, Palaia =

San Gervasio
- Frazione
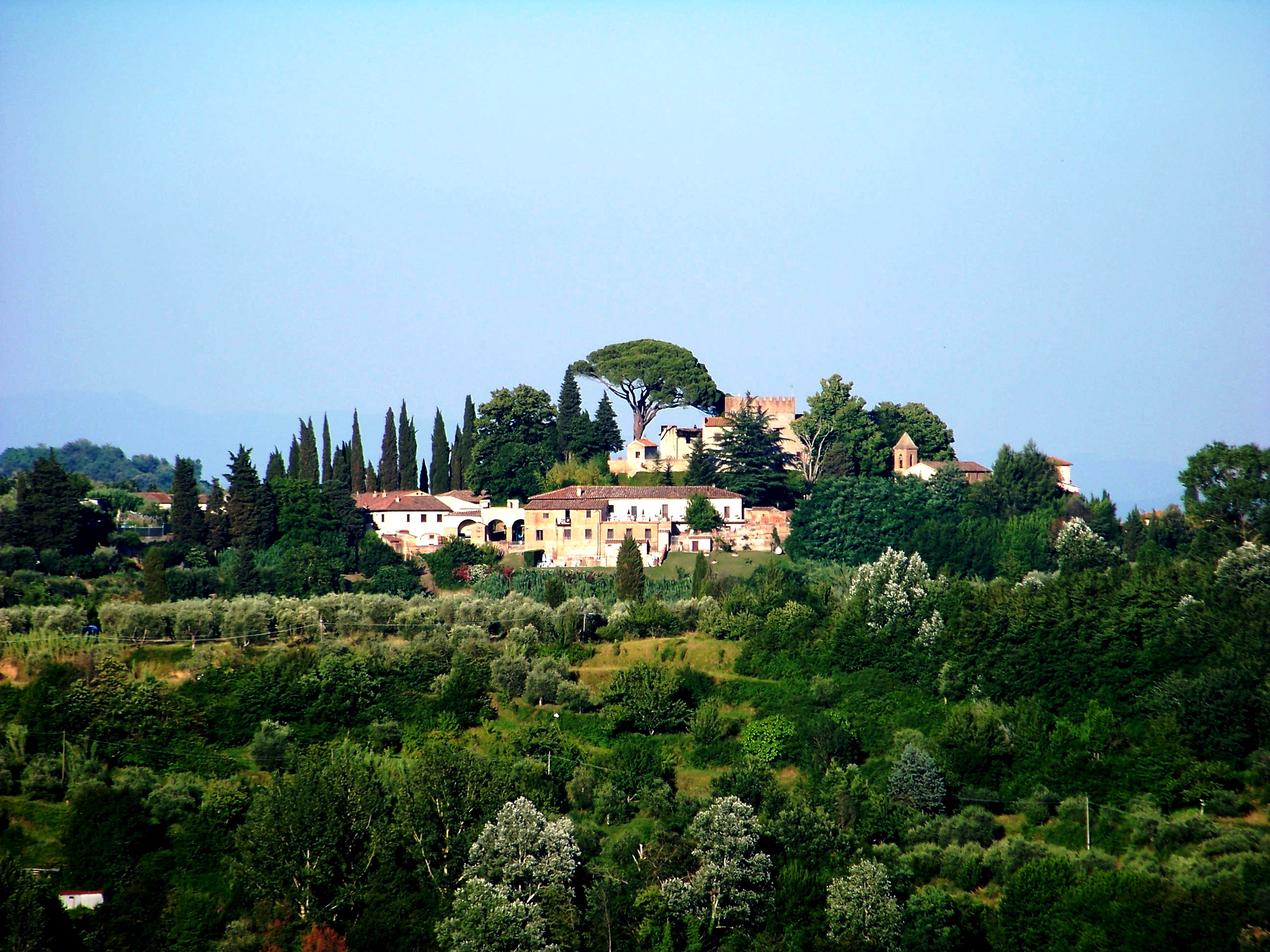

- Location of San Gervasio in Italy
- Coordinates: 43°37′40″N 10°42′45″E
- Country: Italy
- Region: Tuscany
- Province: Pisa (PI)
- Comune: Palaia
- Elevation: 200 m (660 ft)

Population (2011)
  - Total: 20
- Demonym: Sangervasini
- Time zone: UTC+1 (CET)
  - Summer (DST): UTC+2 (CEST)
- Postal code: 56036
- Dialing code: (+39) 0587

San Gervasio is a village in Tuscany, central Italy, administratively a frazione of the comune of Palaia, province of Pisa.

San Gervasio is about 35 km from Pisa and 7 km from Palaia.

== Bibliography ==
- Caciagli, Giuseppe (1972). Pisa e la sua provincia. Vol. 2. Pisa: Colombo Cursi Editore. pp. 730–733.
