= San Biagio, Montecatini Val di Cecina =

Roman Catholic church in Italy

Coordinates: 43.3918°N 10.7513°E

San Biagio is a romanesque-gothic style Roman Catholic church. It was erected during the 14th century in the town of Montecatini Val di Cecina, province of Pisa, in the region of Tuscany, Italy.

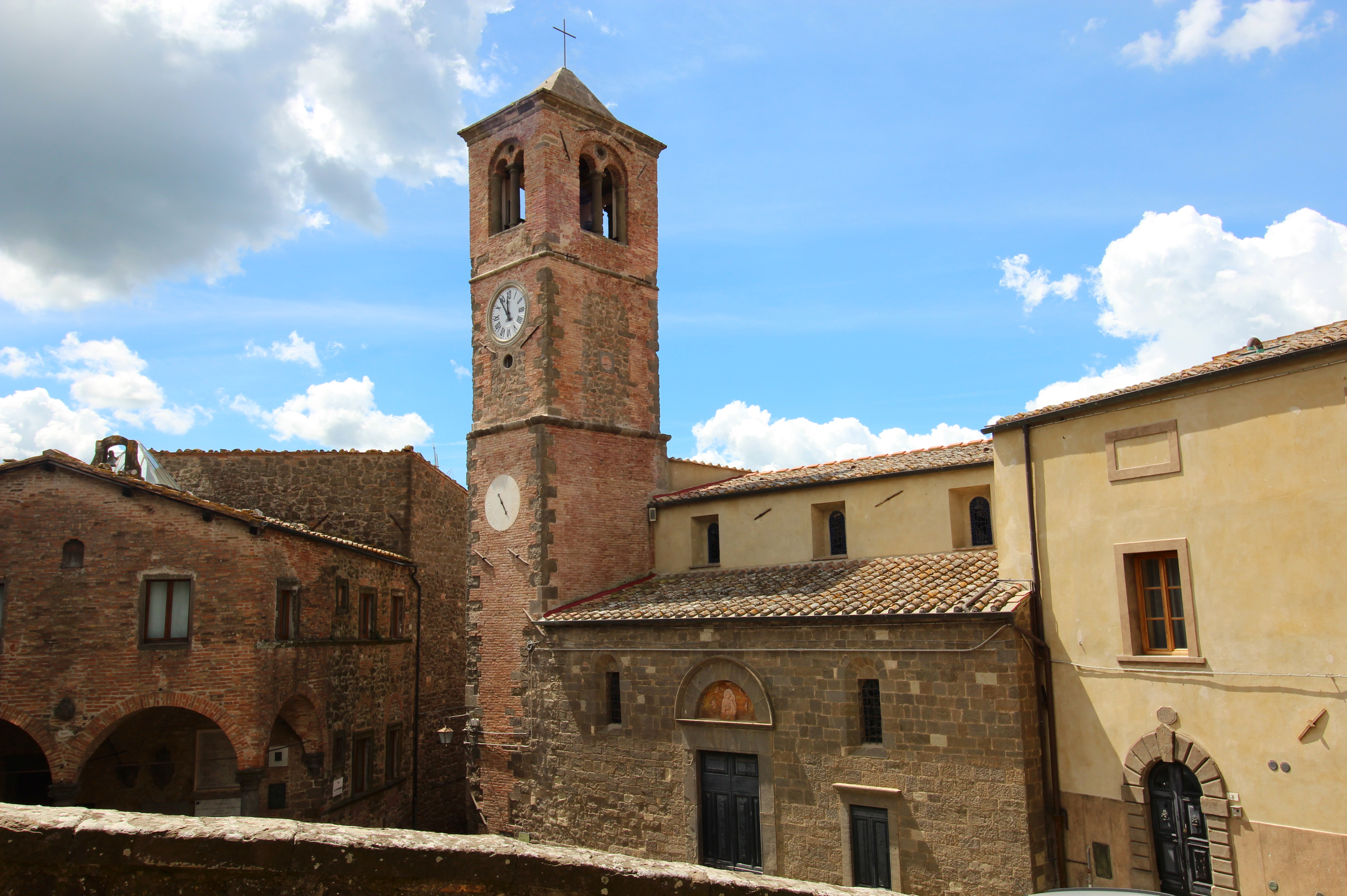
Exterior of the church San Biagio

== History ==
The church was erected in 1356 under the patronage of Ugolino Guducci and Ciullo Barletti. It was consecrated in 1361. In 1421 the duties of the parish church of Gabbreto, then in ruins, along with its baptistry were transferred here to San Biagio. The bell tower was built between 1463 and 1467. In addition the choir was frescoed by an anonymous Sienese painter commissioned by Nicola Nieri of Montecatini.

Between 1514 and 1576, construction of canon's quarters led to sealing of the original facade. Flanking the main altar are two marble angels, called ciechini, attributed to Mino da Fiesole. In the niches above the choir are two terracotta statues by the studio of Della Robbia, depicting Saints Blaise and Sebastian.

In 1787, upon the deconsecration of the Oratory of Camporciano, the statue of the Madonna di Camporciano was moved here.

The church also displays an altarpiece depicting the martyrdom of St Sebastian with Saints Blaise and Antony Abbott, painted by Neri di Bicci.
