= Montanelli, Palaia =

Montanelli
- Frazione
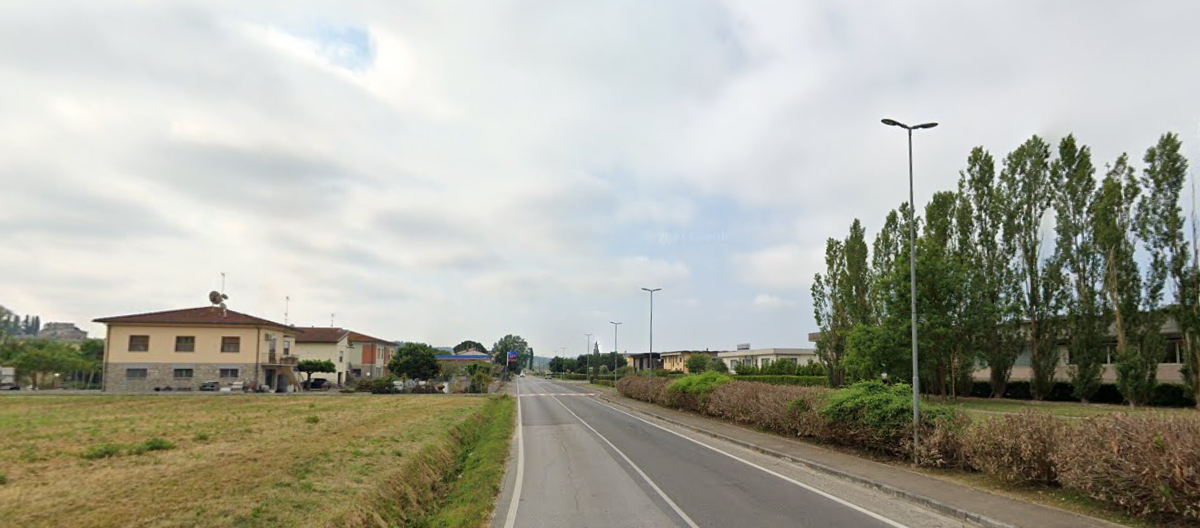

- Location of Montanelli in Italy
- Coordinates: 43°35′32″N 10°43′6″E
- Country: Italy
- Region: Tuscany
- Province: Pisa (PI)
- Comune: Palaia
- Elevation: 38 m (125 ft)

Population (2001)
  - Total: 54
- Time zone: UTC+1 (CET)
  - Summer (DST): UTC+2 (CEST)
- Postal code: 56036
- Dialing code: (+39) 0587

Montanelli is a village in Tuscany, central Italy, administratively a frazione of the comune of Palaia, province of Pisa. At the time of the 2001 census its population was 54.

Montanelli is about 38 km (24 miles) from Pisa and 7 km (4.3 miles) from Palaia.
