= Montechiari =

- Frazione
- Location of Montechiari in Italy
- Coordinates: 43°36′39″N 10°41′47″E
- Country: Italy
- Region: Tuscany
- Province: Pisa (PI)
- Comune: Palaia
- Elevation: 140 m (460 ft)
- Time zone: UTC+1 (CET)
  - Summer (DST): UTC+2 (CEST)
- Postal code: 56036
- Dialing code: (+39) 0587

Montechiari is a village in Tuscany, central Italy, administratively a frazione of the comune of Palaia, province of Pisa.

Montechiari is about 40 km from Pisa and 9 km from Palaia.

== Bibliography ==
- Caciagli, Giuseppe (1972). Pisa e la sua provincia. Vol. 2. Pisa: Colombo Cursi Editore. p. 726.
- Ciampoltrini, Giulio (2006). Gli Etruschi della Valdera. Forme dell'insediamento fra VII e VI secolo a.C. Quaderni Rete Museale Valdera. Pisa: Felici Editore.
