= Gello, Palaia =

Gello
- Frazione
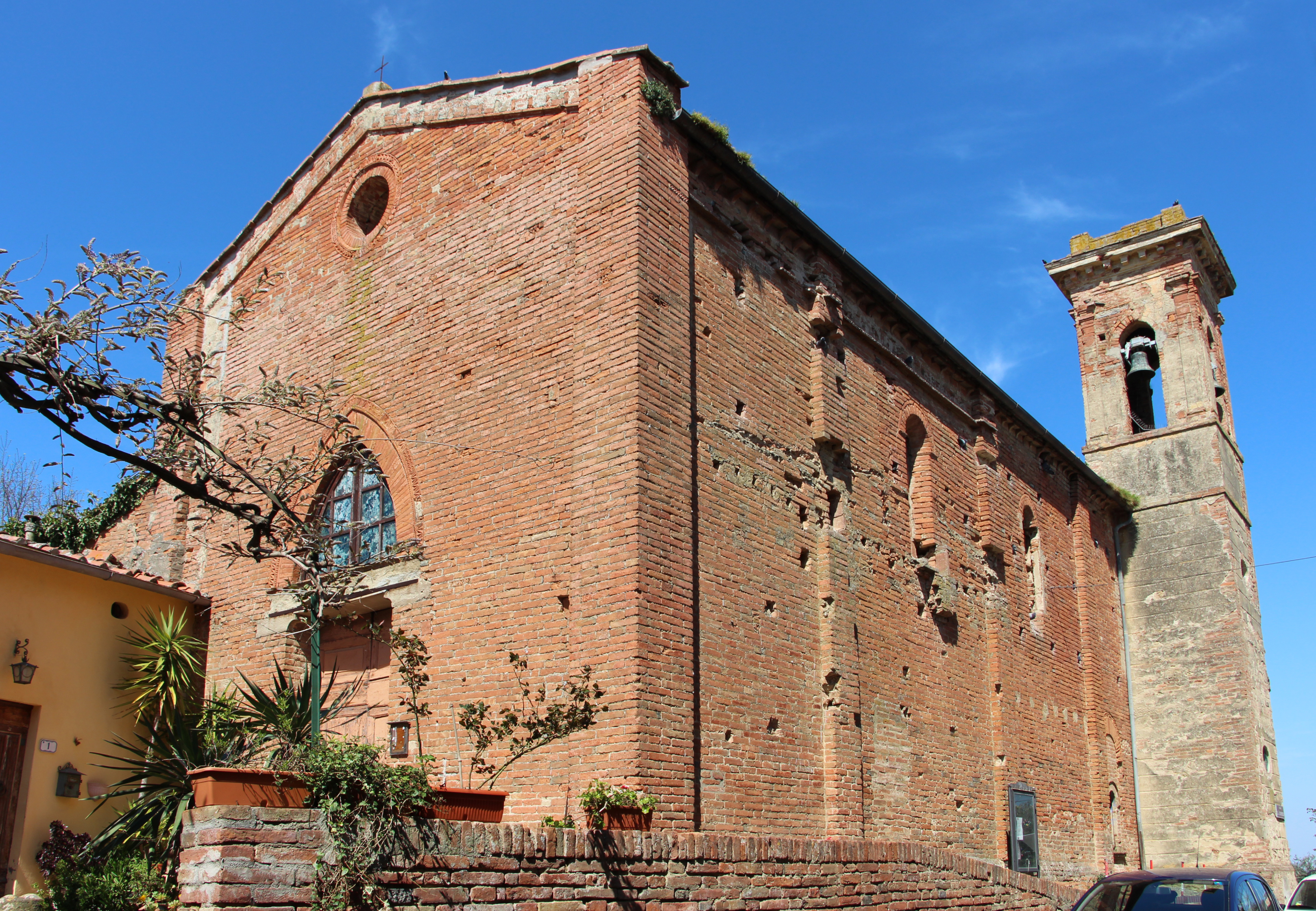
- The church of San Lorenzo in Gello

- Location of Gello in Italy
- Coordinates: 43°36′34″N 10°45′28″E
- Country: Italy
- Region: Tuscany
- Province: Pisa (PI)
- Comune: Palaia
- Elevation: 175 m (574 ft)

Population (2011)
  - Total: 3
- Time zone: UTC+1 (CET)
  - Summer (DST): UTC+2 (CEST)
- Postal code: 56036
- Dialing code: (+39) 0587

Gello is a village in Tuscany, central Italy, administratively a frazione of the comune of Palaia, province of Pisa.

Gello is about 25 km from Pisa and 23 km from Palaia.

== Bibliography ==
- Caciagli, Giuseppe (1972). Pisa e la sua provincia. Vol. 2. Pisa: Colombo Cursi Editore. pp. 724–725.
- Repetti, Emanuele (1833–1846). "Gello". Dizionario Geografico Fisico Storico della Toscana. Archived from the original on 2015-09-23.
