= Buriano, Montecatini Val di Cecina =

Buriano
- Frazione
- Location of Buriano in Italy
- Coordinates: 43°21′51″N 10°8′8″E
- Country: Italy
- Region: Tuscany
- Province: Pisa (PI)
- Comune: Montecatini Val di Cecina
- Elevation: 245 m (804 ft)

Population (2011)
  - Total: 0
- Time zone: UTC+1 (CET)
  - Summer (DST): UTC+2 (CEST)
- Postal code: 56040
- Dialing code: (+39) 0588

Buriano is a village in Tuscany, central Italy, administratively a frazione of the comune of Montecatini Val di Cecina, province of Pisa.

The village is a ghost town since it was abandoned in 1998. Buriano is about 68 km (42 mi) from Pisa and 15 km (9.3 mi) from Montecatini Val di Cecina.

== Bibliography ==
- Caciagli, Giuseppe (1972). Pisa e la sua provincia. Vol. 2. Pisa: Colombo Cursi Editore. pp. 571–573.
- Guelfi, Cecilia (1997). "Buriano". Dizionario di Volterra. Volume II: La città e il territorio. Pisa: Pacini Editore.
- Repetti, Emanuele (1833). "Buriano". Dizionario geografico fisico storico della Toscana. Florence. Archived from the original on 2016-03-11.
