= Casino di Terra =

- Frazione
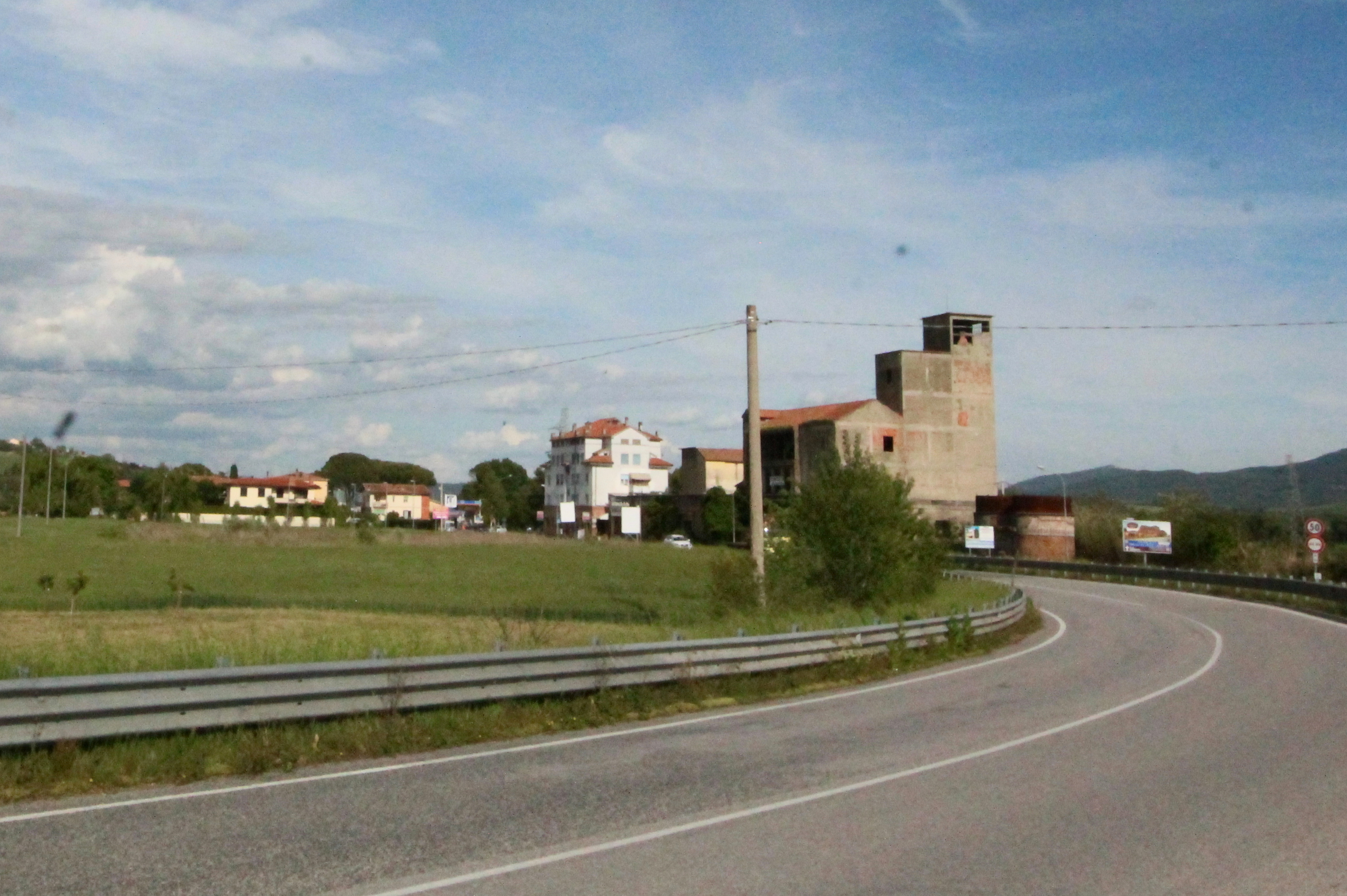

- Location of Casino di Terra in Italy
- Coordinates: 43°19′43″N 10°39′59″E
- Country: Italy
- Region: Tuscany
- Province: Pisa (PI)
- Comune: Guardistallo; Montecatini Val di Cecina
- Elevation: 68 m (223 ft)

Population (2011)
  - Total: 108
- Time zone: UTC+1 (CET)
  - Summer (DST): UTC+2 (CEST)
- Postal code: 56040
- Dialing code: (+39) 0586 / 0588

Casino di Terra is a village in Tuscany, central Italy, administratively a frazione of the comuni of Guardistallo and Montecatini Val di Cecina, province of Pisa. At the time of the 2001 census its population was 97.

Casino di Terra is about 70 km from Pisa, 5 km from Guardistallo and 18 km from Montecatini Val di Cecina.
