= Gello, Montecatini Val di Cecina =

Gello
- Frazione
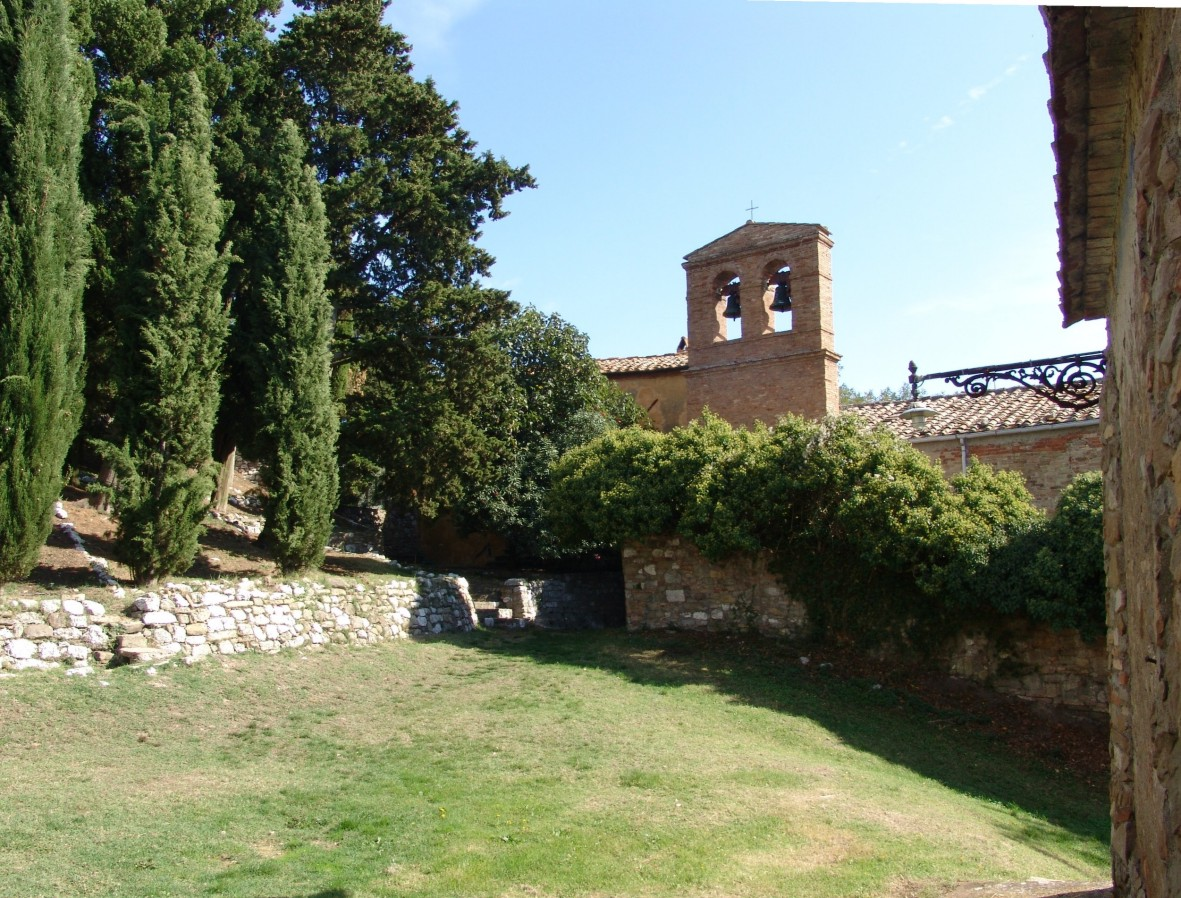

- Location of Gello in Italy
- Coordinates: 43°20′42″N 10°42′12″E
- Country: Italy
- Region: Tuscany
- Province: Pisa (PI)
- Comune: Montecatini Val di Cecina
- Elevation: 200 m (660 ft)

Population
  - Total: 88
- Time zone: UTC+1 (CET)
  - Summer (DST): UTC+2 (CEST)
- Postal code: 56040
- Dialing code: (+39) 0588

Gello is a village in Tuscany, central Italy, administratively a frazione of the comune of Montecatini Val di Cecina, province of Pisa. At the time of the 2006 parish census its population was 88.

Gello is about 70 km from Pisa and 9 km from Montecatini Val di Cecina.
