= Toiano, Palaia =

Toiano
- Frazione
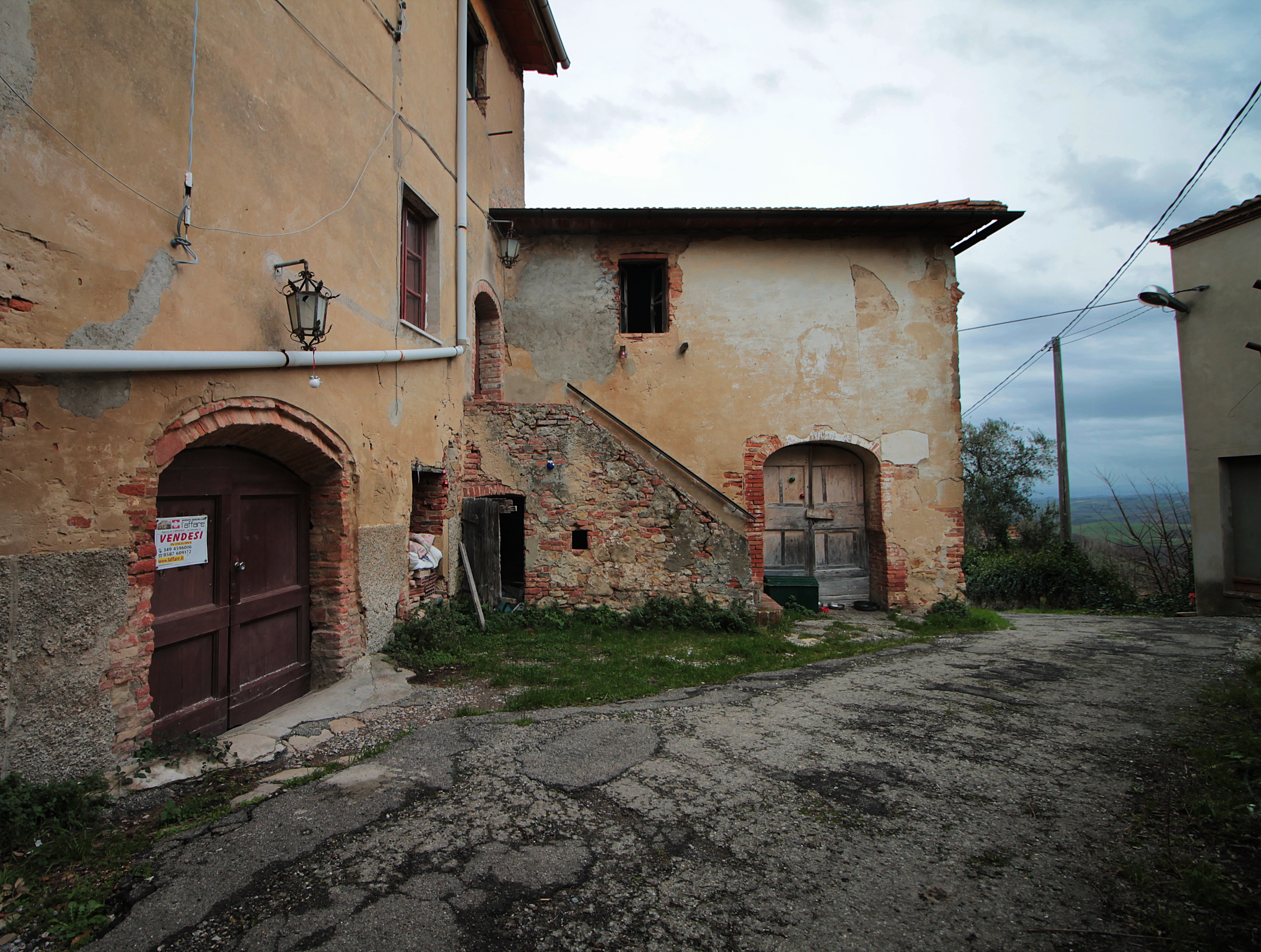

- Location of Toiano in Italy
- Coordinates: 43°35′14″N 10°48′39″E
- Country: Italy
- Region: Tuscany
- Province: Pisa (PI)
- Comune: Palaia
- Elevation: 270 m (890 ft)

Population
  - Total: 3
- Time zone: UTC+1 (CET)
  - Summer (DST): UTC+2 (CEST)
- Postal code: 56036
- Dialing code: (+39) 0587

Toiano is a village in Tuscany, central Italy, administratively a frazione of the comune of Palaia, province of Pisa.

Toiano is about 50 km from Pisa and 8 km from Palaia.

== Bibliography ==
- Caciagli, Giuseppe (1972). Pisa e la sua provincia. Vol. 2. Pisa: Colombo Cursi Editore. pp. 733–736.
