= Guardistallo =

- Comune
- Comune di Guardistallo
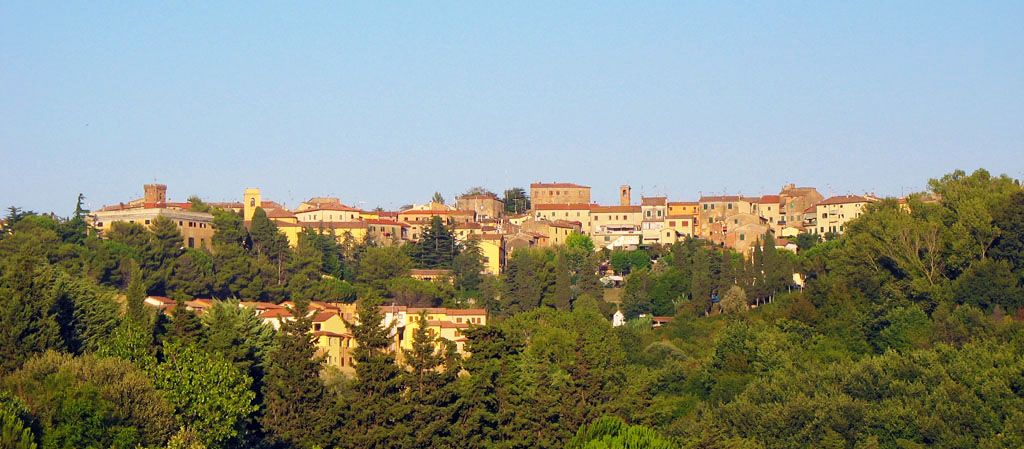
- Panorama of Guardistallo

- Coat of arms

- Location within Italy Location within Tuscany
- Coordinates: 43°19′N 10°38′E
- Country: Italy
- Region: Tuscany
- Province: Pisa (PI)
- Frazioni: Casino di Terra

Government
  - Mayor: Mario Giuseppe Ettore Gruppelli

Area
  - Total: 23.8 km^{2} (9.2 sq mi)
- Elevation: 278 m (912 ft)

Population (2008)
  - Total: 1,218
  - Density: 51.2/km^{2} (133/sq mi)
- Demonym: Guardistallini
- Time zone: UTC+1 (CET)
  - Summer (DST): UTC+2 (CEST)
- Postal code: 56040
- Dialing code: 0586
- Website: Official website

Guardistallo is a comune (municipality) in the Province of Pisa in the Italian region Tuscany, located about 70 kilometres (43 mi) southwest of Florence and about 50 kilometres (31 mi) southeast of Pisa.

== History ==
During the summer of 1944, it was the theatre of the Guardistallo massacre, carried out by German occupation forces. On 29 June 1944, 61 people were killed and buried in a mass grave. An extra person was wounded in the same occasion and died in the following days.

Archeology research shows that the area of Guardistallo was inhabited since the Eneolithic (Copper Age).
