= Jello Shoecompany =

- Type: Private
- Founded: 1989
- Headquarters: Graz, Austria
- Products: Shoes, Apparel, Accessories
- Website: www.jelloshoecompany.com

Jello is a chain of shoe and accessory retail stores. It is a subsidiary of Leder und Schuh with its headquarters in Graz, Austria.

== History ==
The first Jello store was opened in 1989 in Wiener Neustadt. Seven years later Jello entered the German market, and in 2000 the Slovenian market. In 2003 its branch network consisted of about 100 stores in three countries.

In 2006 the brand Jello Schuhpark was relaunched as Jello Shoecompany, with a new corporate design and modernised market appearance. The first store to be relaunched was in Austria in Wiener Neustadt in September 2007.

Today Jello also appears on the market in Hungary, Croatia and Germany.

== See also ==
- Leder und Schuh
