= Riserva naturale Foresta di Berignone =

Nature reserve in Tuscany, Italy

Foresta di Berignone Nature Reserve
- Type: Regional nature reserve
- Location: Province of Pisa, Tuscany, Italy
- Nearest city: Volterra
- Area: 21.66 km²
- Established: 1995
- Operator: Comunità montana Val di Cecina

The Foresta di Berignone Nature Reserve is a protected area in the Province of Pisa, Tuscany, Italy. It was established in 1995 and covers an area of 2,166 hectares. The area contains archaeological remains, scenic landscapes, and traditional Tuscan rural features.

== History ==
The area has been inhabited since ancient times and still contains traces of Etruscan settlements. In the 10th century it became the property and fief of the bishops of Volterra. It was later annexed to the territory of the free commune of Volterra, which began exploiting its timber for salt evaporation.

Annexed with Volterra to the Republic of Florence, it later came under the House of Medici, following the fate of the Grand Duchy of Tuscany. The Medici grand dukes made it a vast game reserve, which was abolished in 1775 by Pietro Leopoldo.

== Geography ==
The reserve includes forested areas and hills within the Alta Val di Cecina territory. The reserve lies within several municipalities of the Province of Pisa.

== Geology ==
=== Fauna ===
The reserve hosts a variety of wildlife species, including deer, wild boar, and numerous bird species.

=== Flora ===
The vegetation is predominantly Mediterranean forest, with oak, holm oak, and Mediterranean scrub.
