= Ponteginori =

- Frazione
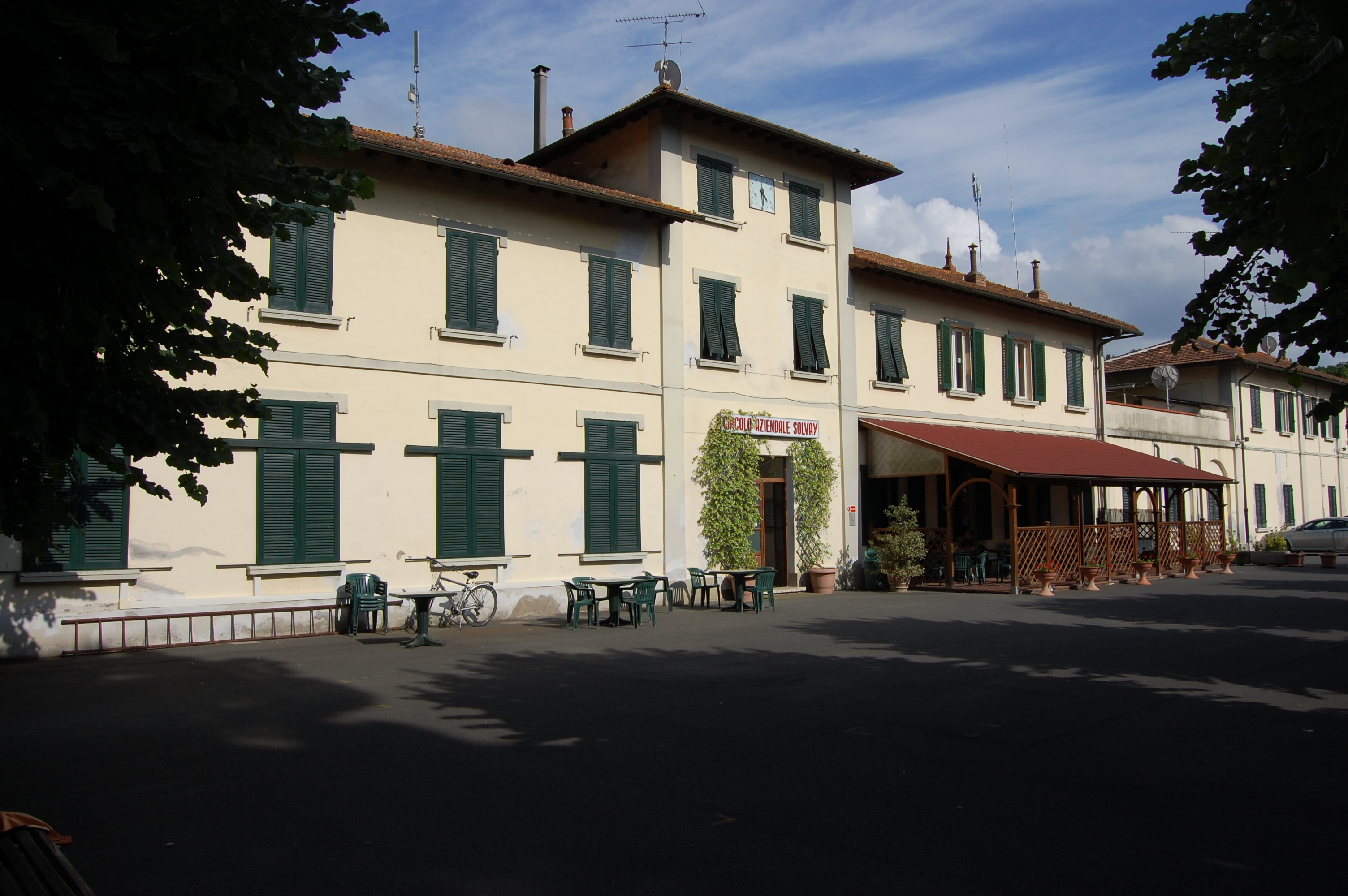

- Location of Ponteginori in Italy
- Coordinates: 43°20′9″N 10°44′50″E
- Country: Italy
- Region: Tuscany
- Province: Pisa (PI)
- Comune: Montecatini Val di Cecina
- Elevation: 54 m (177 ft)

Population (2011)
  - Total: 464
- Demonym: Ponteginorini
- Time zone: UTC+1 (CET)
  - Summer (DST): UTC+2 (CEST)
- Postal code: 56040
- Dialing code: (+39) 0588

Ponteginori is a village in Tuscany, central Italy, administratively a frazione of the comune of Montecatini Val di Cecina, province of Pisa. At the time of the 2001 census its population was 532.

Ponteginori is about 75 km from Pisa and 10 km from Montecatini Val di Cecina.
