= Querceto, Montecatini Val di Cecina =

Querceto
- Frazione
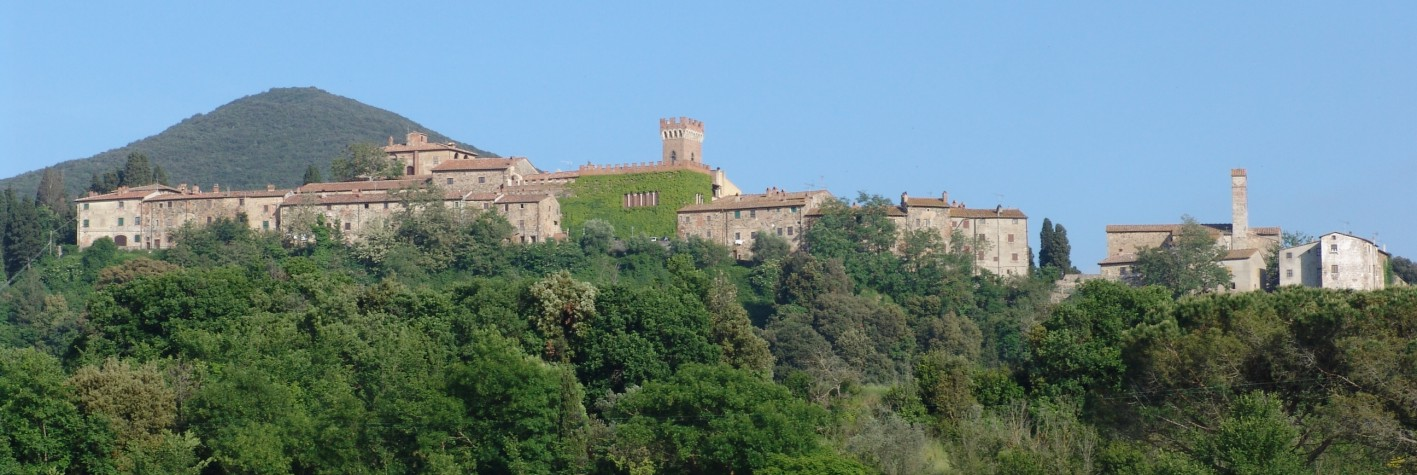
- The village and the castle of Querceto (Montecatini Val di Cecina)

- Location of Querceto in Italy
- Coordinates: 43°17′41.5″N 10°43′41.9″E
- Country: Italy
- Region: Tuscany
- Province: Pisa (PI)
- Comune: Montecatini Val di Cecina

Population (2005)
  - Total: 100
- Time zone: UTC+1 (CET)
  - Summer (DST): UTC+2 (CEST)
- Postal code: 56040
- Dialing code: 0588

Querceto (Oak Wood) is a frazione in the comune of Montecatini Val di Cecina of the Province of Pisa in Italy. The village is located on the slopes of Mount Aneo, near Volterra

== Bibliography ==
- Accademia libera natura e cultura, Querceto Percorsi, Spirito Libero Publinship, 2010, ISBN 88-96512-05-0
