= Crespina Lorenzana =

- Comune
- Comune di Crespina Lorenzana
- Location within Italy Location within Tuscany
- Coordinates: 43°34′26″N 10°33′55″E
- Country: Italy
- Region: Tuscany
- Province: Pisa (PI)
- Frazioni: Cenaia, Crespina, Laura, Lorenzana, Tremoleto, Tripalle

Government
  - Mayor: Thomas D'Addona

Area
  - Total: 46.43 km^{2} (17.93 sq mi)
- Elevation: 86 m (282 ft)

Population (30 September 2013)
  - Total: 5,436
  - Density: 117.1/km^{2} (303.2/sq mi)
- Time zone: UTC+1 (CET)
  - Summer (DST): UTC+2 (CEST)
- Postal code: 56040; 56043
- Dialing code: 050
- Website: Official website

Crespina Lorenzana is a comune (municipality) in the Province of Pisa in the Italian region Tuscany.

== Geography ==
Crespina Lorenzana borders the following municipalities: Casciana Terme Lari, Cascina, Collesalvetti, Fauglia, Orciano Pisano, Santa Luce.

=== Subdivisions ===
The municipality is composed by six frazioni (towns and villages):

- Cenaia
- Crespina (municipal seat)
- Laura
- Lorenzana
- Tremoleto
- Tripalle

== History ==
The municipality of Crespina Lorenzana was created on 1 January 2014 by merging the former municipalities of Crespina and Lorenzana. The municipal seat is in Crespina.
