= Laura, Crespina Lorenzana =

Laura
- Frazione
- Location of Laura in Italy
- Coordinates: 43°32′22″N 10°31′37″E
- Country: Italy
- Region: Tuscany
- Province: Pisa (PI)
- Comune: Crespina Lorenzana
- Elevation: 127 m (417 ft)

Population (2011)
  - Total: 298
- Time zone: UTC+1 (CET)
  - Summer (DST): UTC+2 (CEST)
- Postal code: 56042
- Dialing code: (+39) 050

Laura is a village in Tuscany, central Italy, administratively a frazione of the comune of Crespina Lorenzana, province of Pisa.

Laura lies at the slopes of the hill of Lorenzana. It is about 24 km from Pisa and 8 km from the municipal seat of Crespina.

== Bibliography ==
- Caciagli, Giuseppe (1972). Pisa e la sua provincia. Vol. 2. Pisa: Colombo Cursi Editore.
