= Tripalle =

- Frazione
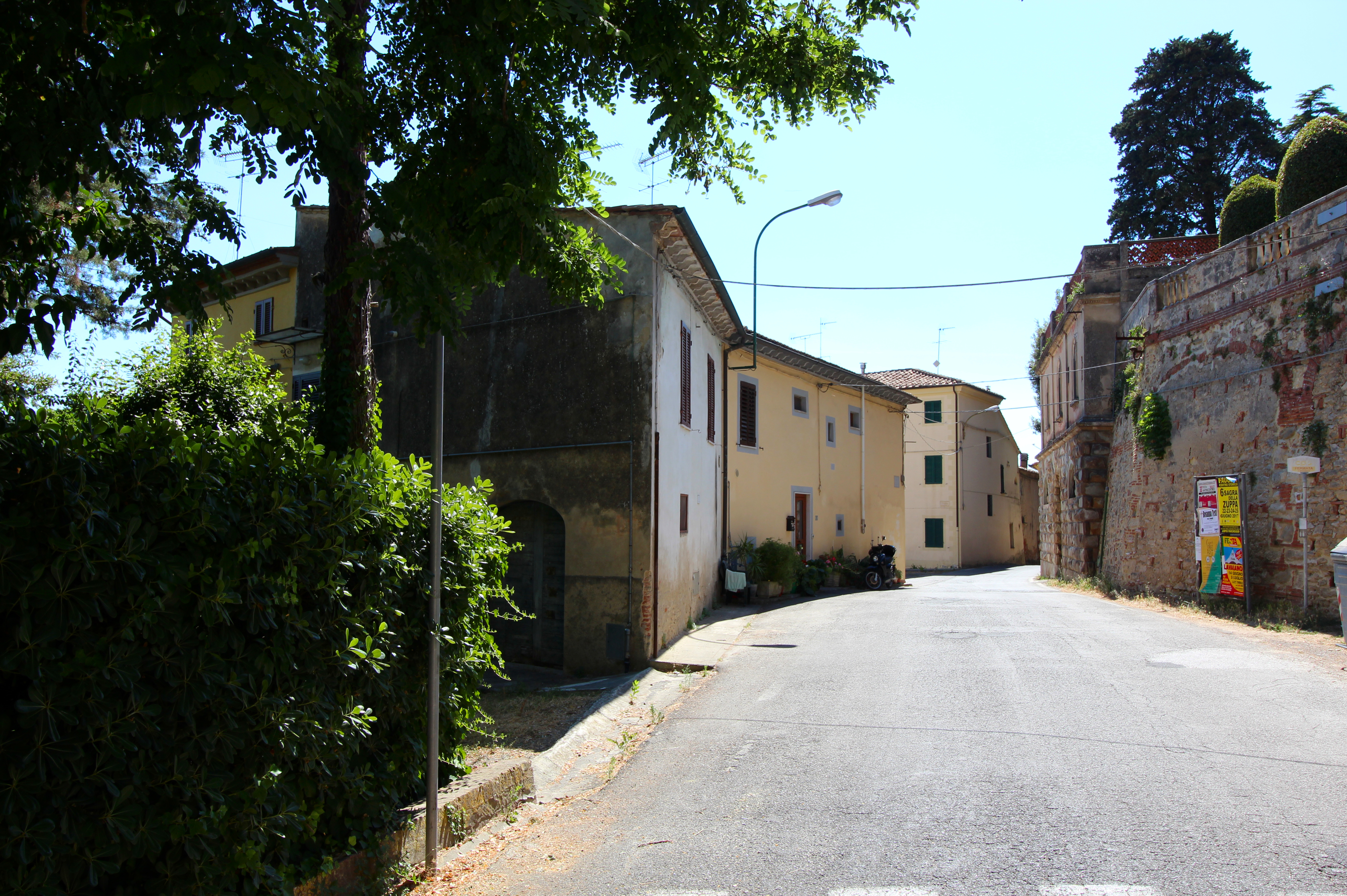

- Location of Tripalle in Italy
- Coordinates: 43°34′20″N 10°32′46″E
- Country: Italy
- Region: Tuscany
- Province: Pisa (PI)
- Comune: Crespina Lorenzana
- Elevation: 79 m (259 ft)

Population (2001)
  - Total: 124
- Time zone: UTC+1 (CET)
  - Summer (DST): UTC+2 (CEST)
- Postal code: 56042
- Dialing code: (+39) 050

Tripalle is a village in Tuscany, central Italy, administratively a frazione of the comune of Crespina Lorenzana, province of Pisa. At the time of the 2001 census its population was 124.

Tripalle is about 30 km from Pisa and 2 km from Crespina.
