= Cenaia =

- Frazione
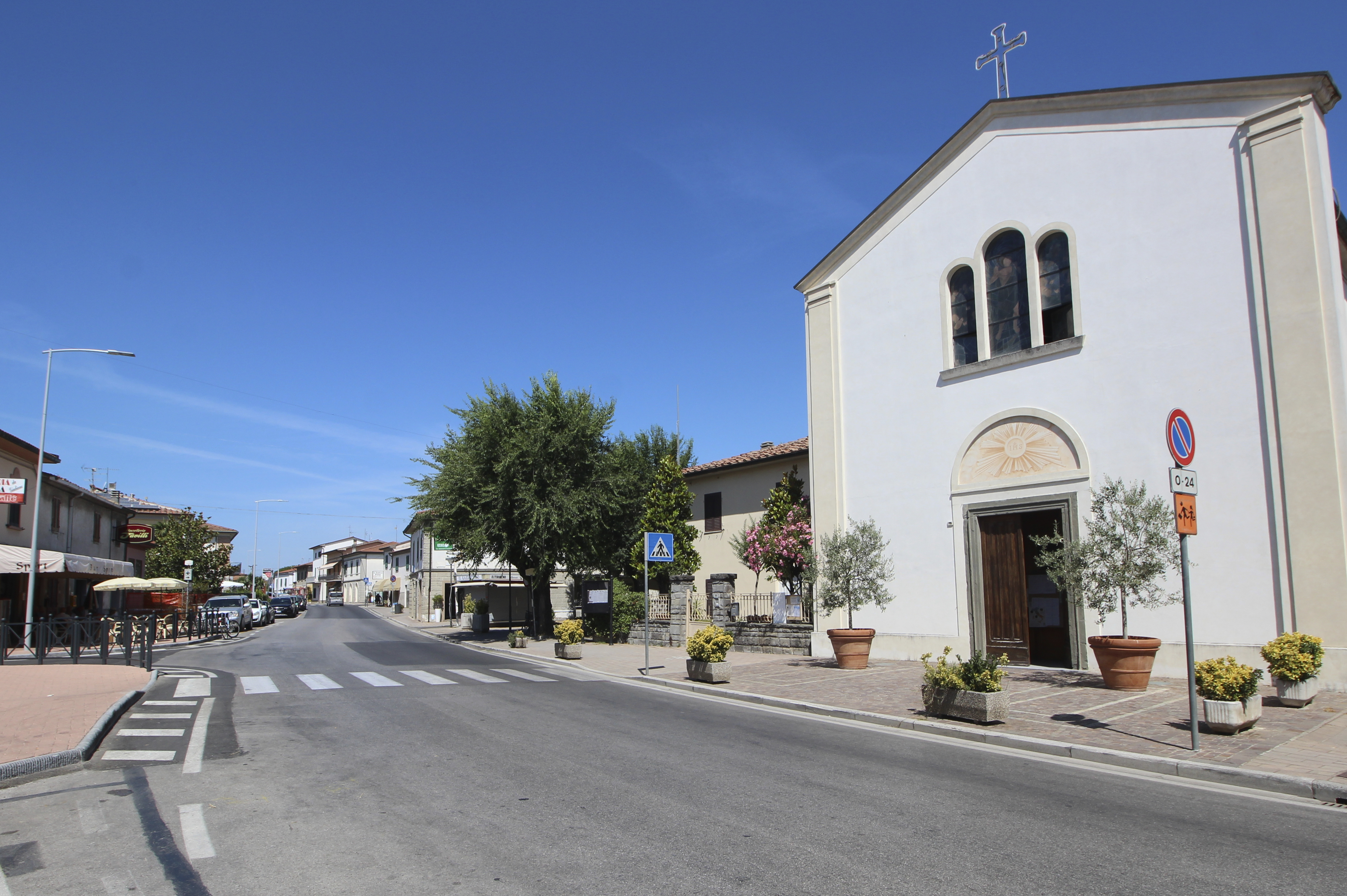

- Location of Cenaia in Italy
- Coordinates: 43°36′24″N 10°32′11″E
- Country: Italy
- Region: Tuscany
- Province: Pisa (PI)
- Comune: Crespina Lorenzana
- Elevation: 21 m (69 ft)

Population (2011)
  - Total: 2,086
- Demonym: Cenaiesi
- Time zone: UTC+1 (CET)
  - Summer (DST): UTC+2 (CEST)
- Postal code: 56040
- Dialing code: (+39) 050

Cenaia is a village in Tuscany, central Italy, administratively a frazione of the comune of Crespina Lorenzana, province of Pisa. At the time of the 2001 census its population was 1,700.

Cenaia is about 26 kilometres (16 mi) from Pisa and 7 km (4.3 mi) from Crespina.
