= Fauglia =

- Comune
- Comune di Fauglia
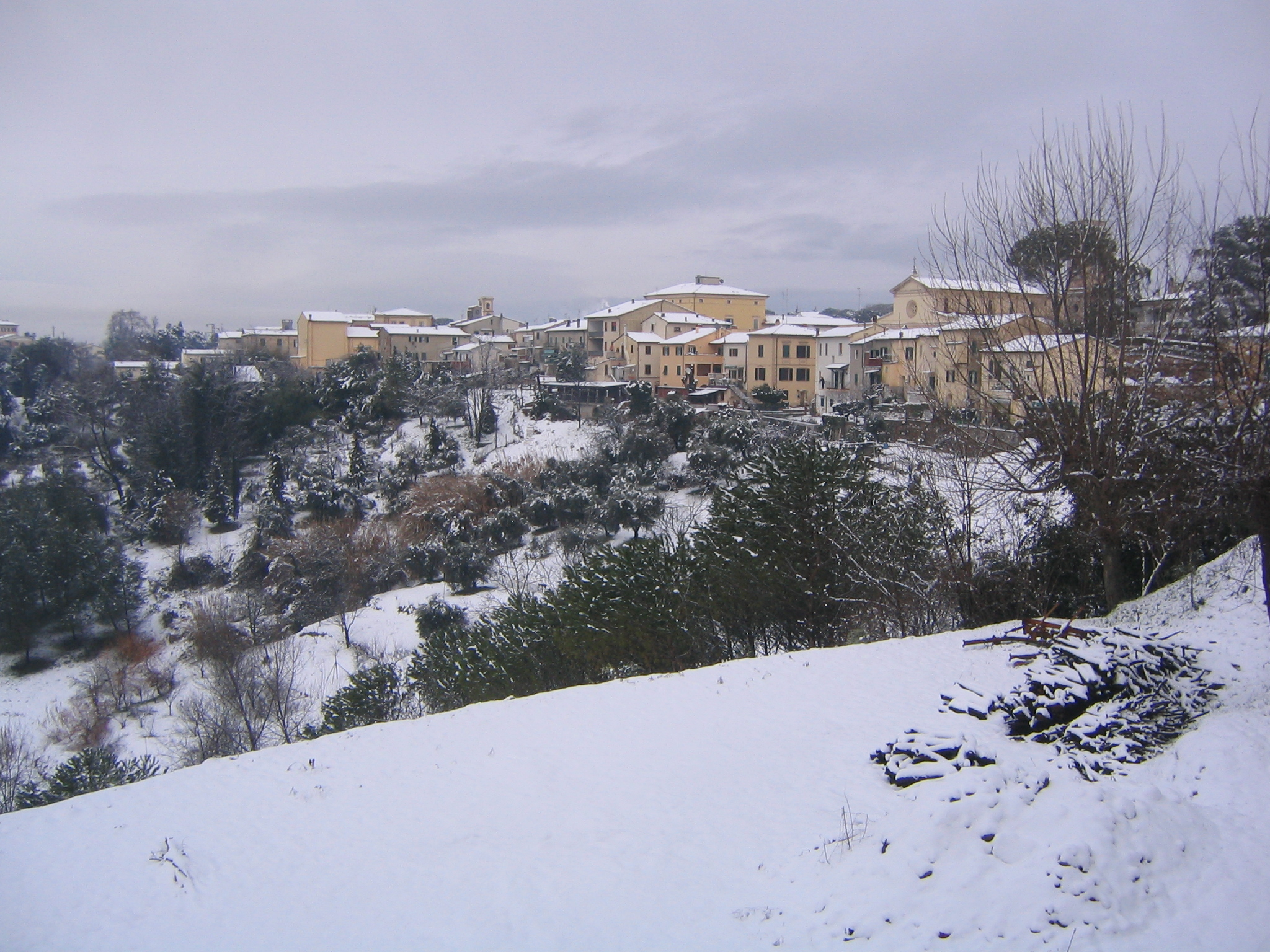
- Fauglia under snow

- Coat of arms

- Location within Italy Location within Tuscany
- Coordinates: 43°34′N 10°31′E
- Country: Italy
- Region: Tuscany
- Province: Pisa (PI)
- Frazioni: Acciaiolo, Luciana, Valtriano

Government
  - Mayor: Carlo Carli

Area
  - Total: 42.4 km^{2} (16.4 sq mi)
- Elevation: 91 m (299 ft)

Population (December 2004)
  - Total: 3,298
  - Density: 77.8/km^{2} (201/sq mi)
- Demonym: Faugliesi
- Time zone: UTC+1 (CET)
  - Summer (DST): UTC+2 (CEST)
- Postal code: 56043
- Dialing code: 050
- Patron saint: St. Lawrence
- Website: Official website

Fauglia (Italian pronunciation: [faˈuʎʎa]) is a comune (municipality) in the Province of Pisa in the Italian region Tuscany, located about 60 kilometres (37 mi) southwest of Florence and about 20 kilometres (12 mi) southeast of Pisa. As of 31 December 2004, it had a population of 3,298 and an area of 42.4 square kilometres (16.4 mi^{2}).

== Geography ==
Fauglia borders the following municipalities: Collesalvetti, Crespina, Lorenzana, Orciano Pisano. The town originated as a small medieval burgh around a castle, destroyed by the Florentines in 1433.

Frazioni

The municipality is formed by the municipal seat of Fauglia and the villages (frazioni) of Acciaiolo, Luciana and Valtriano.

== Demographics ==
Historical population

Year	Pop.	±%
1861	3,575	—
1871	3,875	+8.4%
1881	4,077	+5.2%
1901	4,869	+19.4%
1911	4,809	−1.2%

Year	Pop.	±%
1921	4,724	−1.8%
1931	4,522	−4.3%
1936	4,378	−3.2%
1951	4,531	+3.5%
1961	3,825	−15.6%

Year	Pop.	±%
1971	2,667	−30.3%
1981	2,603	−2.4%
1991	2,873	+10.4%
2001	3,124	+8.7%

Source: Data from ISTAT

== Notable civic institutions ==
- The Institutes for the Achievement of Human Potential (IAHP), a United States–based nonprofit organization, established a campus in Fauglia in 1992. The IAHP is an educational organization that teaches parents about child brain development and is a treatment center for brain-injured children.
