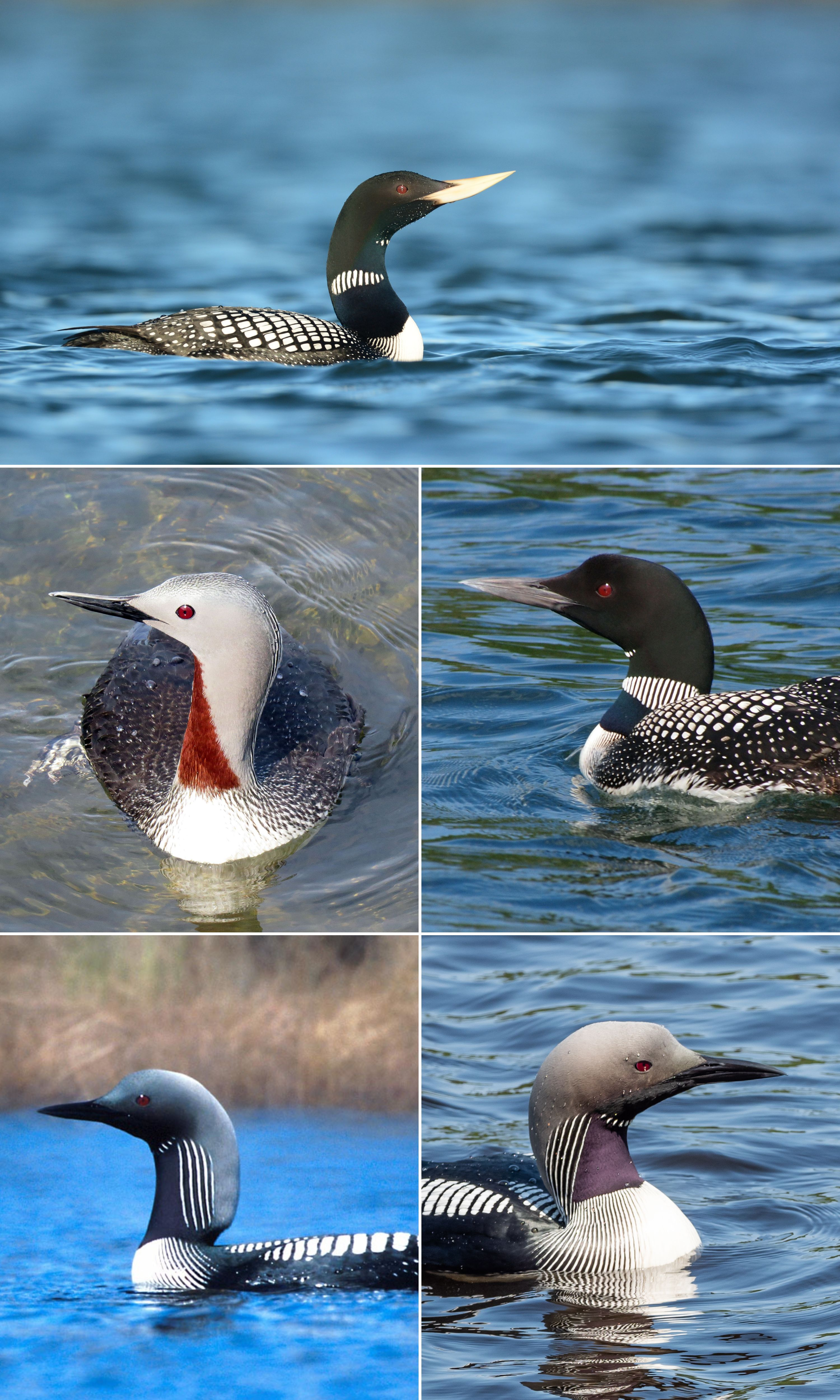
- Clockwise from top: yellow-billed loon (G. adamsii), common loon (G. immer), black-throated loon (G. arctica), pacific loon (G. pacifica), red-throated loon (G. stellata)

Scientific classification
- Kingdom: Animalia
- Phylum: Chordata
- Class: Aves
- Order: Gaviiformes
- Family: Gaviidae; Coues, 1903
- Genus: Gavia; Forster, 1788

Type species
- Gavia immer

Diversity
- 5 species

Synonyms
- Family-level: Colymbidae Vigors, 1825 (but see text); Colymbinae Bonaparte, 1831 (but see text); Urinatores Vieillot, 1818; Urinatoridae Vieillot, 1818; Urinatorides Vieillot, 1818 Genus-level: Colymbus Linnaeus, 1758 (but see text); Urinator Lacépède, 1799

= Loon =

Divers/Loons Temporal range: Early Miocene – Recent 20.43–0 Ma

Family of birds

Loons (North American English) or divers (British / Irish English) are a group of aquatic birds found in much of North America and northern Eurasia. All living species of loons are members of the genus Gavia, family Gaviidae, and order Gaviiformes.

== Description ==
Loons, which are the size of large ducks or small geese, resemble these birds in shape when swimming. Like ducks and geese, but unlike coots (which are Rallidae) and grebes (Podicipedidae), the loon's toes are connected by webbing. The loons may be confused with the cormorants (Phalacrocoracidae), but can be distinguished from them by their distinct call. Cormorants are not-too-distant relatives of loons, and like them are heavy-set birds whose bellies, unlike those of ducks and geese, are submerged when swimming. Loons in flight resemble plump geese with gulls' wings that are relatively small in proportion to their bulky bodies. The bird points its head slightly upwards while swimming, but less so than cormorants. In flight, the head droops more than in similar aquatic birds.

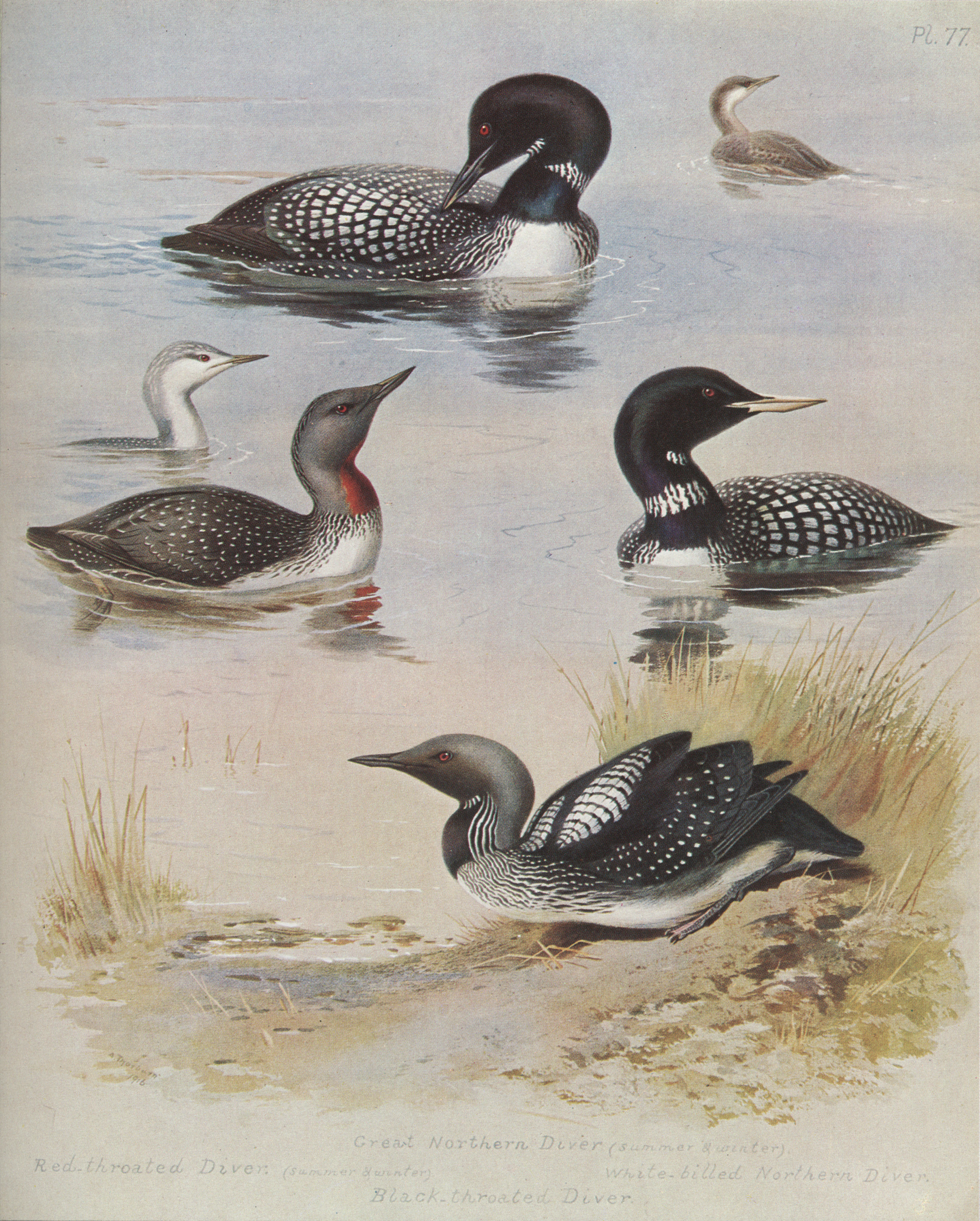
1918 illustration of a variety of loons by Archibald Thorburn. Top: common loon, mid-left: red-throated loon, mid-right: yellow-billed loon, bottom: black-throated loon

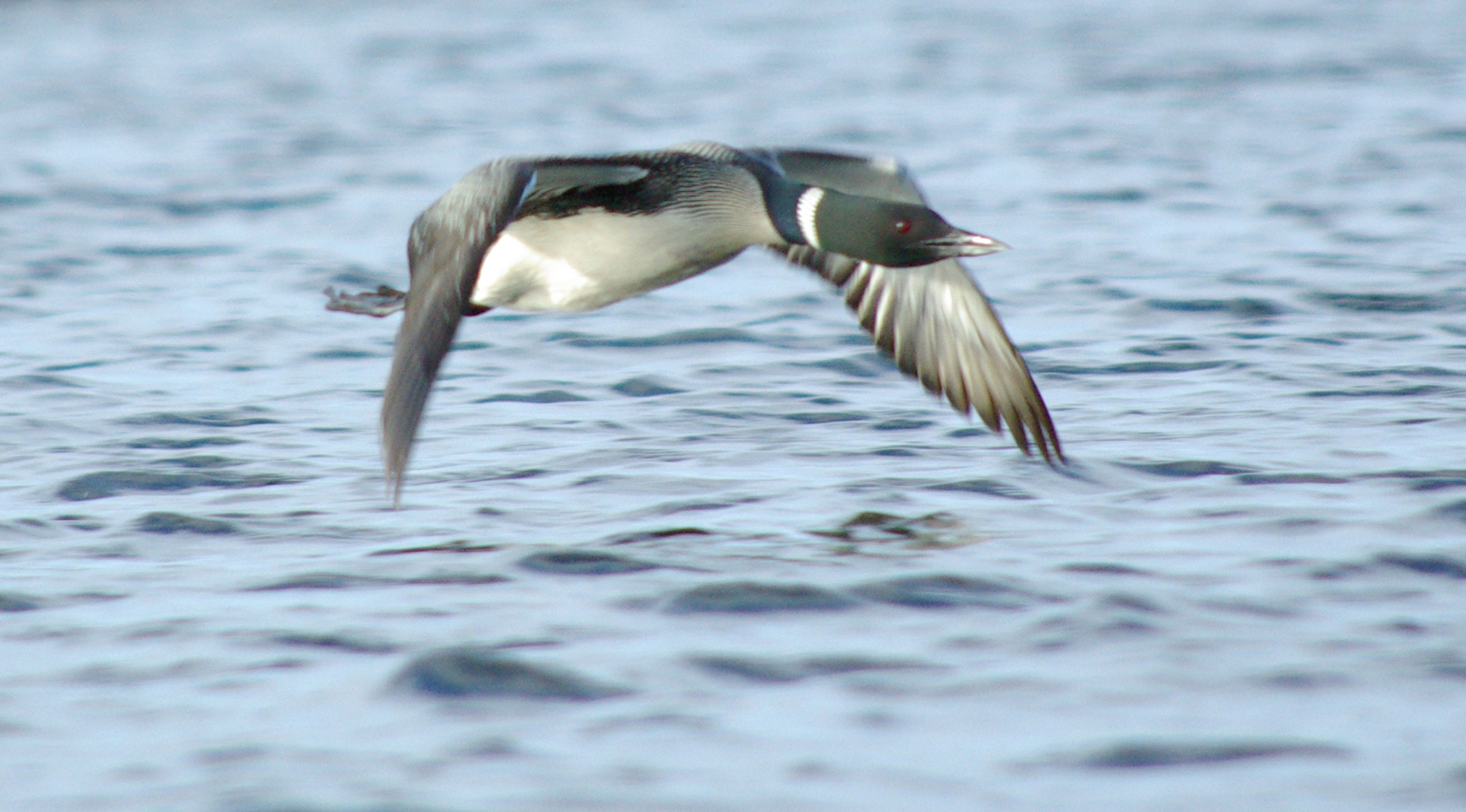
Common loon flying exhibiting the typical flight profile of a Gavia species

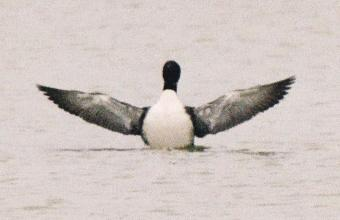
Common loon (Gavia immer) rearing up: Note the plump body and pointed but rather short wings

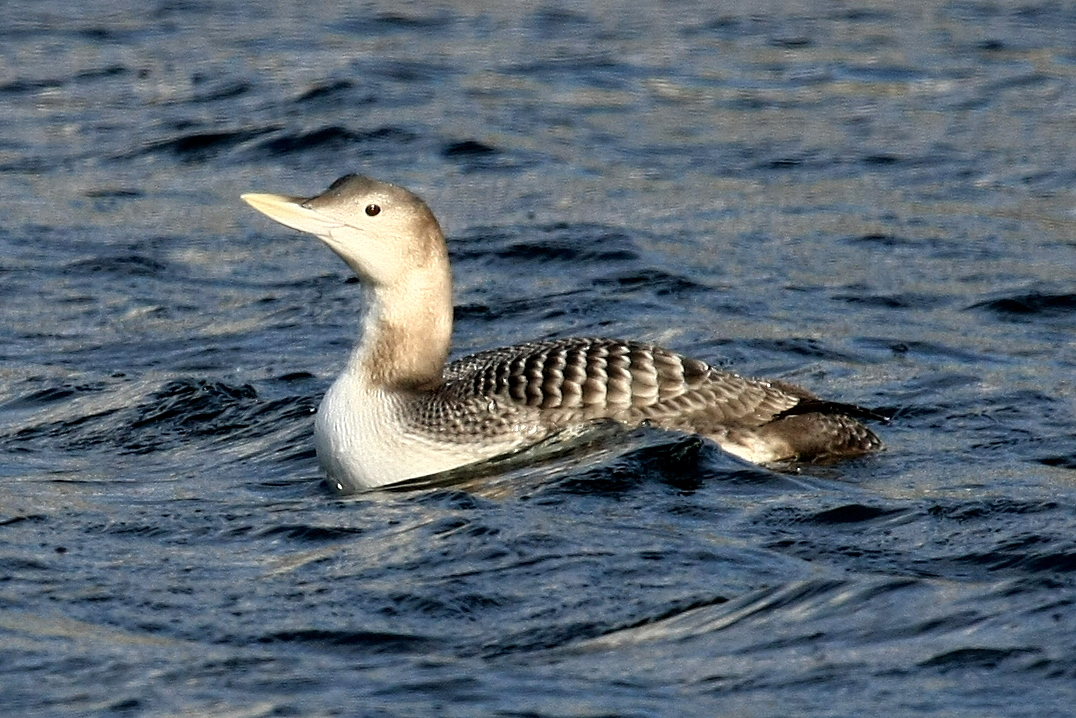
Yellow-billed loon (Gavia adamsii) in winter plumage

Male and female loons have identical plumage, which is largely patterned black-and-white in summer, with grey on the head and neck in some species. All have a white belly. This resembles many sea-ducks (Mergini) – notably the smaller goldeneyes (Bucephala) – but is distinct from most cormorants, which rarely have white feathers, and if so, usually as large, rounded patches rather than delicate patterns. All species of loons have a spear-shaped bill.

Males are larger on average, but relative size is only apparent when the male and female are together. In winter, plumage is dark grey above, with some indistinct lighter mottling on the wings, and a white chin, throat, and underside. The specific species can then be distinguished by certain features, such as the size and colour of the head, neck, back, and bill. Reliable identification of loons in winter is often difficult even for experts – particularly as the smaller, immature birds look similar to winter-plumage adults, making size an unreliable means of identification.

Gaviiformes are among the few groups of birds in which the young moult into a second coat of down feathers after shedding their first one, rather than growing juvenile feathers with downy tips that wear off, as is typical in many birds. This trait is also found in tubenoses (Procellariiformes) and penguins (Sphenisciformes), both relatives of the loon in the same clade of Aequornithes (the "core water birds").

== Behaviour and ecology ==
Loons swimming in Wood Lake, BC, on a summer morning

Loons are excellent swimmers, using their feet to propel themselves above and under water. However, since their feet are located far back on the body, loons have difficulty walking on land, though they can effectively run short distances to reach water when frightened. Thus, loons avoid coming to land, except for mating and nesting.

Loons fly strongly, though they have high wing loading (mass to wing-area ratio), which complicates takeoff. Indeed, most species must run upwind across the water's surface with wings flapping to generate sufficient lift to take flight. Only the red-throated loon (G. stellata) can take off from land. Once airborne, loons are capable of long flights during migration. Scientists from the U.S. Geological Survey, who have implanted satellite transmitters in some individuals, have recorded daily flights of up to 1,078 km (670 mi) in a 24-hour period, which probably resulted from single movements. North European loons migrate primarily via the South Baltic and directly over land to the Black Sea or Mediterranean. Loons can live as long as 30 years and can hold their breath for as long as 90 seconds while underwater.

Loons are migratory birds, and in the winter, they move from their northern freshwater lake nesting habitats to southern marine coastlines. They are well-adapted to this change in salinity, however, because they have special salt glands located directly above their eyes. These glands filter out salts in their blood and flush this salty solution out through their nasal passages, which allows them to immediately consume fish from oceans and drink saltwater after their long migration.

Common loons sometimes form social gatherings of several adults in late summer. Studies in North America suggest that these events are attended largely by nonbreeding individuals and relate to territory assessment and social familiarity rather than foraging or migration.

=== Diet and feeding ===
Loons find their prey by sight. They eat mainly fish, supplemented with amphibians, crustaceans, and similar midsized aquatic fauna. Specifically, they have been noted to feed on crayfish, frogs, snails, salamanders, and leeches. They prefer clear lakes because they can more easily see their prey through the water. Loons use their pointy bills to stab or grasp prey. They eat vertebrate prey headfirst to facilitate swallowing, and swallow all their prey whole.

To help digestion, loons swallow small pebbles from the bottoms of lakes. Similar to grit eaten by chickens, these gastroliths may assist the loon's gizzard in crushing the hard parts of the loon's food, such as the exoskeletons of crustaceans and the bones of frogs and salamanders. The gastroliths may also be involved in stomach cleaning as an aid to regurgitation of indigestible food parts.

Loons may inadvertently ingest small lead pellets, released by anglers and hunters, that will contribute to lead poisoning and the loon's eventual death. Jurisdictions that have banned the use of lead shot and sinkers include Maine, New Hampshire, Vermont, Michigan, some areas of Massachusetts, Yellowstone National Park, Canada, Great Britain, and Denmark.

=== Reproduction ===
Loons nest during the summer on freshwater lakes and/or large ponds. Smaller bodies of water (up to 0.5 km^{2}) usually only have one pair. Larger lakes may have more than one pair, with each pair occupying a bay or section of the lake. The red-throated loon, however, may nest colonially, several pairs close together, in small Arctic tarns and feed at sea or in larger lakes, ferrying the food in for the young.

Loons mate on land, often on the future nest site, and build their nests close to the water, preferring sites that are completely surrounded by water, such as islands or emergent vegetation. Loons use a variety of materials to build their nests, including aquatic vegetation, pine needles, leaves, grass, moss, and mud. Sometimes, nest material is almost lacking. Both males and females build the nest and incubate jointly for 28 days. If the eggs are lost, the pair may renest, usually in a different location. Since the nest is very close to the water, rising water may induce the birds to slowly move the nest upwards, over a metre.

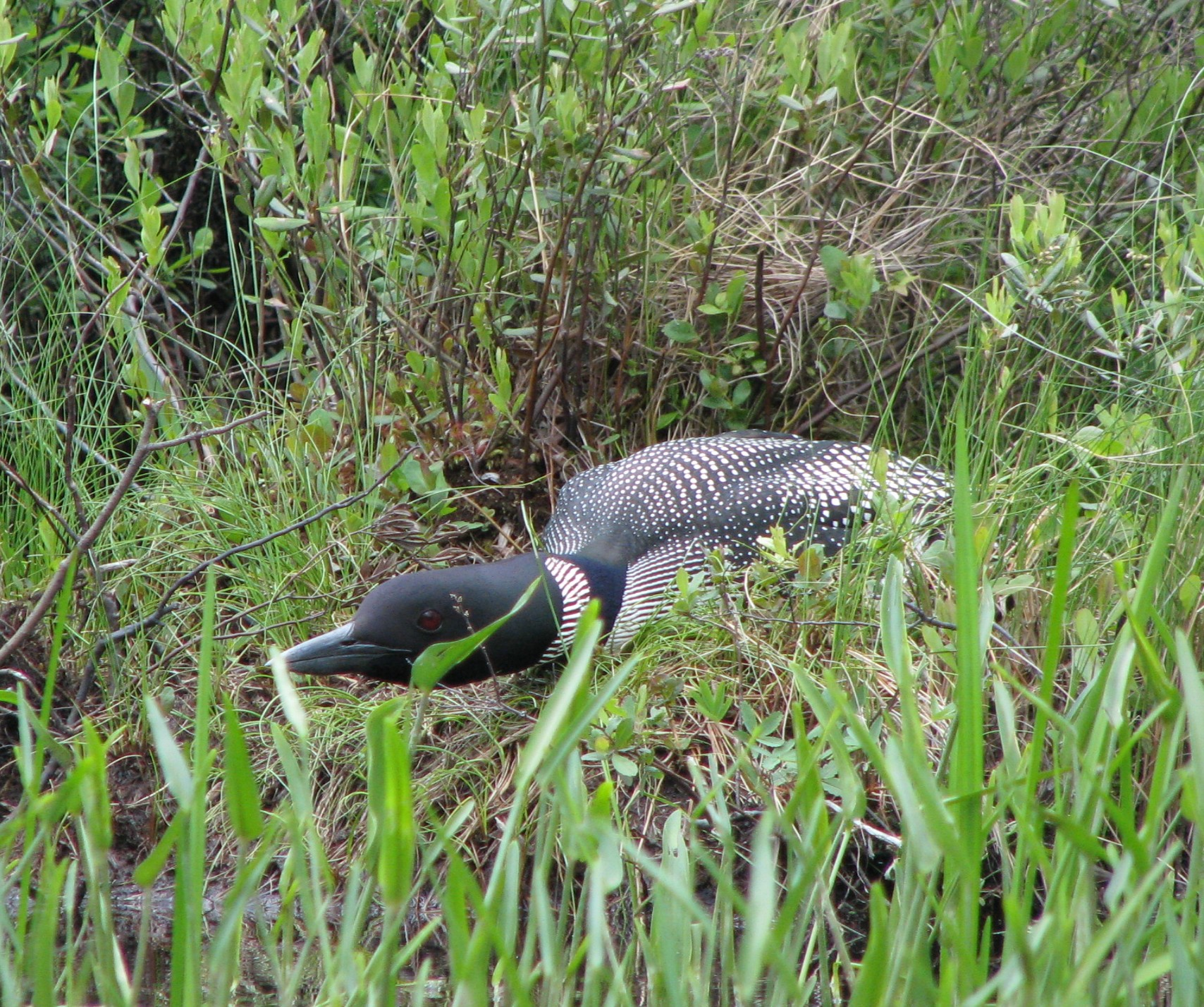
Common loon on the nest

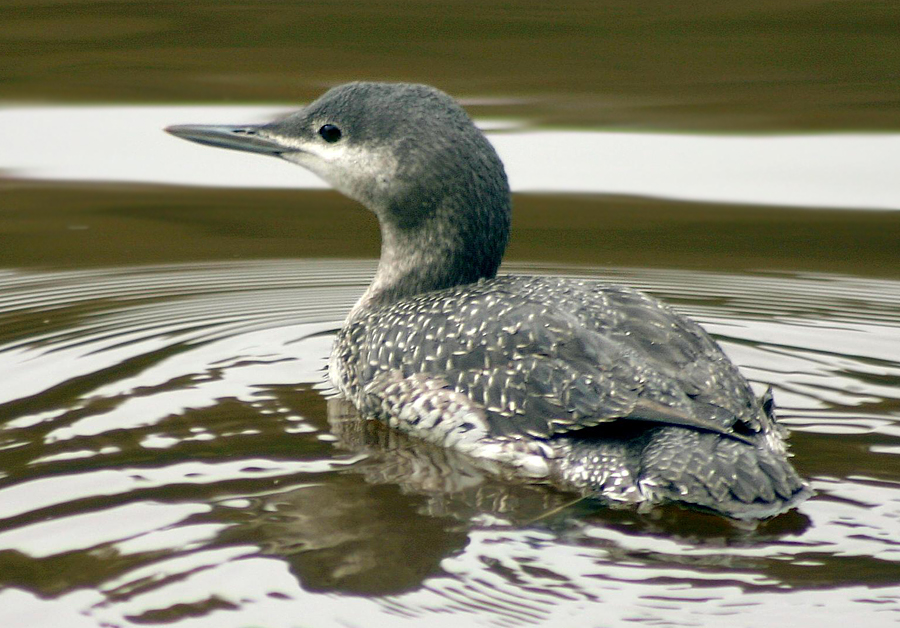
Juvenile red-throated loon

Common loon feeding its young

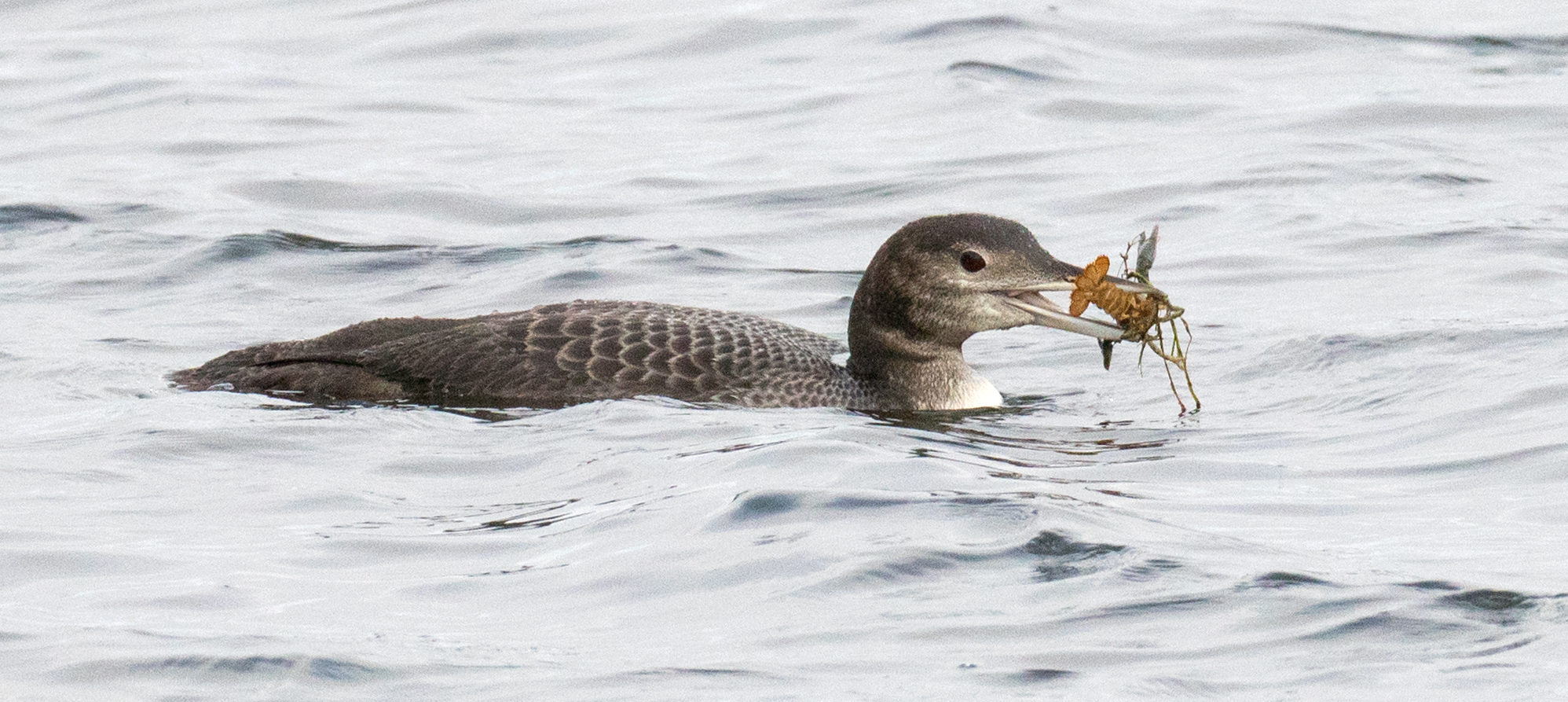
Juvenile common loon with crayfish

Despite the roughly equal participation of the sexes in nest building and incubation, analysis has shown clearly that males alone select the location of the nest. This pattern has the important consequence that male loons, but not females, establish significant site-familiarity with their territories that allows them to produce more chicks there over time. Sex-biased site-familiarity might explain, in part, why resident males fight so hard to defend their territories.

Most clutches consist of two eggs, which are laid in May or June, depending upon latitude. Loon chicks are precocial, able to swim and dive right away, but will often ride on their parents' back during their first two weeks to rest, conserve heat, and avoid predators. Chicks are fed mainly by their parents for about six weeks, but gradually begin to feed themselves over time. By 11 or 12 weeks, chicks gather almost all of their own food and have begun to fly. In 2019, a necropsy of a bald eagle found floating on a Maine lake (beside the floating body of a loon chick) found that the eagle had been stabbed through the heart by an adult loon's beak.

Biologists at Chapman University have studied the mating behaviour of the common loon (G. immer). Contrary to popular belief, pairs seldom mate for life. Indeed, a typical adult loon is likely to have several mates during its lifetime because of territorial takeover. Each breeding pair must frequently defend its territory against "floaters" (territory-less adults) trying to evict at least one owner and seize the breeding site. Territories that have produced chicks in the past year are especially prone to takeovers, because nonbreeding loons use chicks as cues to indicate high-quality territories. One-third of all territorial evictions among males result in the death of the owner; in contrast, female loons usually survive. Birds that are displaced from a territory but survive usually try to re-mate and (re)claim a breeding territory later in life.

In 2020, a loon hatched for the first time in over a century in Southeastern Massachusetts at Fall River. The chicks had been relocated in 2015 from Maine and New York to Lakeville, Massachusetts with the hopes of re-establishing breeding and nesting patterns.

== Etymology and taxonomy ==
Loons calling

The European Anglophone name "diver" comes from the bird's habit of catching fish by swimming calmly along the surface and then abruptly plunging into the water. The North American name "loon" likely comes from either the Old English word lumme, meaning lummox or awkward person, or the Scandinavian word lum meaning lame or clumsy. Either way, the name refers to the loon's poor ability to walk on land.

Another possible derivation is from the Norwegian, Swedish and Danish word lom for these birds, which comes from Old Norse lómr, possibly cognate with English "lament", referring to the characteristic plaintive sound of the loon.

The scientific name Gavia refers to seabirds in general. The scientific name Gavia was the Latin term for the smew (Mergellus albellus). This small sea-duck is quite unrelated to loons and just happens to be another black-and-white seabird which swims and dives for fish. It is not likely that the ancient Romans had much knowledge of loons, as these are limited to more northern latitudes and since the end of the last glacial period seem to have occurred only as rare winter migrants in the Mediterranean region.

The term gavia was transferred from the ducks to the loons only in the 18th century. Earlier naturalists referred to the loons as mergus (the Latin term for diving seabirds of all sorts) or colymbus, which became the genus name used in the first modern scientific description of a Gavia species (by Carl Linnaeus) in 1758. Unfortunately, confusion about whether Linnaeus's "wastebin genus" Colymbus referred to loons or grebes abounded. North American ornithologists used the genus name to refer to grebes, while Europeans used it for loons, following Nicholas Aylward Vigors and Richard Bowdler Sharpe.

The International Commission on Zoological Nomenclature tried to settle this issue in 1956 by declaring Colymbus a suppressed name unfit for further use and establishing Gavia, created by Johann Reinhold Forster in 1788, as the valid genus name for the loons. However, the situation was not completely resolved even then, and the following year the ICZN had to act again to prevent Louis Pierre Vieillot's 1818 almost-forgotten family name Urinatoridae from overruling the much younger Gaviidae. Some eminent ornithologists such as Pierce Brodkorb tried to keep the debate alive, but the ICZN's solution has been satisfactory.

== Systematics and evolution ==
All living species are placed in the genus Gavia. It has been suggested that the genus Gavia originated in Europe during the Paleogene. The earliest species, G. egeriana, was found in early Miocene deposits in Dolnice in the Czech Republic. During the remainder of the Miocene, Gavia managed to disperse into North America via the Atlantic coastlines, eventually making their way to the continent's Pacific coastlines by the Late Miocene. Study of the interrelationships of the extant species has found that the red-throated loons are the most basal of the five species.

- - - Gavia stellata
  - - - G. arctica
      - G. pacifica
    - - G. immer
      - G. adamsii

Cladogram of the extant Gavia species.

Lineage	Image	Scientific name	Distribution
Basal lineage		Red-throated loon or red-throated diver, Gavia stellata	Northern hemisphere generally north of 50°, inland in summer and in coastal areas in winter as far south as Florida and southern China
Black-throated lineage		Black-throated loon, Arctic loon, or black-throated diver, Gavia arctica	Northern Europe and Asia, breeding inland and wintering on Atlantic and Pacific coasts
Black-throated lineage		Pacific loon or Pacific diver, Gavia pacifica (formerly in G. arctica)	Northern Canada and eastern Siberia, and winters along the Pacific coast of North America
Black-headed lineage		Common loon, or great northern diver, Gavia immer	Coasts and lakes of Canada and the US as far south as Mexico, and on the Atlantic coast of Europe
Black-headed lineage		Yellow-billed loon or white-billed diver, Gavia adamsii	Breeds in the north of Russia, Canada, and Alaska, USA.

=== Fossil record ===
- - - †Gavia egeriana
    - - †G. schultzi
      - - - †G. howardae
          - G. stellata
        - - †G. brodkorbi
          - †G. paradoxa
          - - - †G. moldavica
              - - †G. concinna
                - - G. arctica
                  - G. pacifica
            - - †G. fortis
              - - G. adamsii
                - G. immer

Cladogram of the Gavia species with the inclusion of fossil species.

Nearly ten prehistoric species have been named to date in the genus Gavia, and about as many undescribed ones await further study. The genus is known from the Early Miocene onwards, and the oldest members are rather small (some are smaller than the red-throated loon). Throughout the late Neogene, the genus by and large follows Cope's Rule (that population lineages tend to increase in body size over evolutionary time).

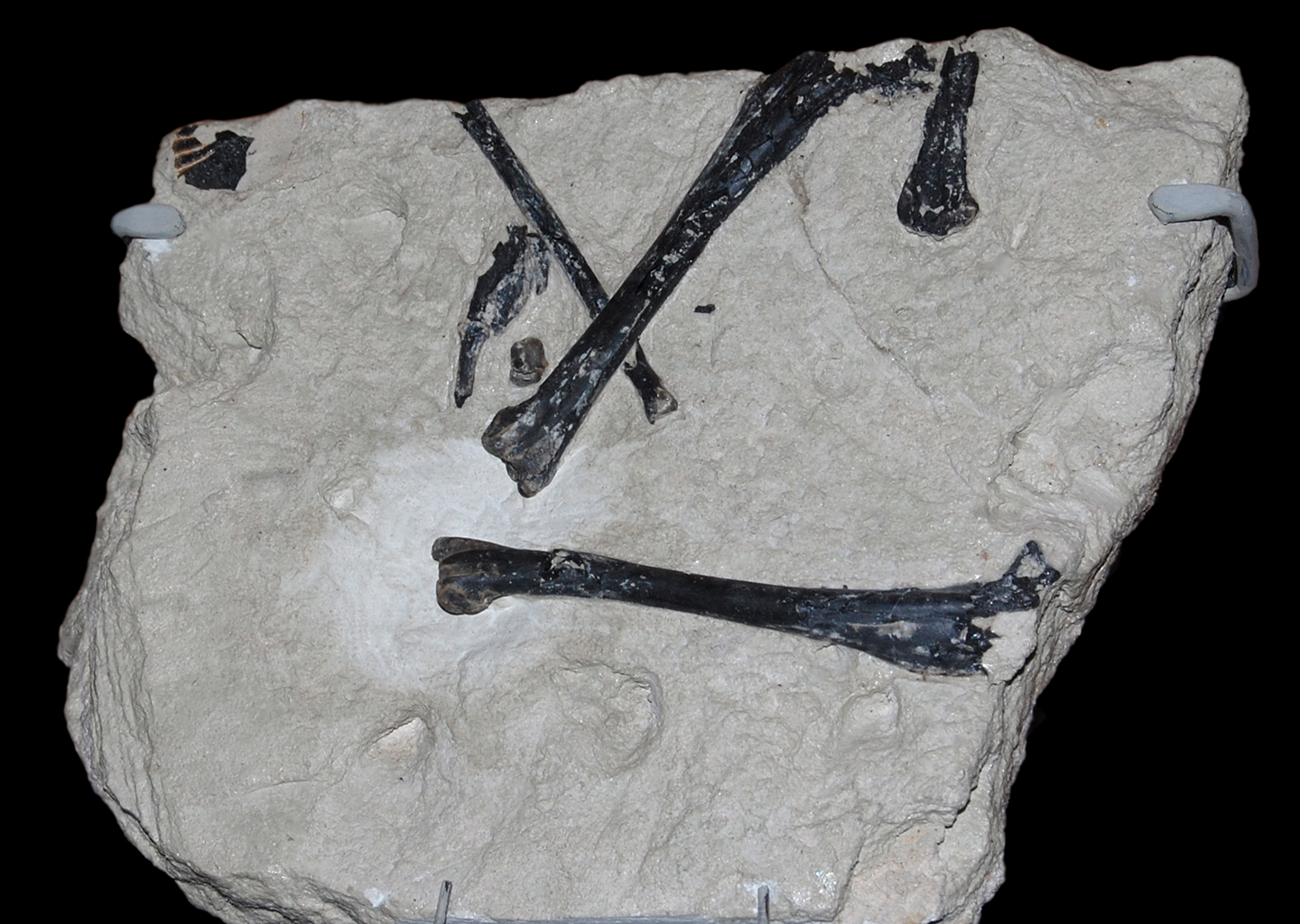
Fossil of G. schultzi in Vienna

List of fossil Gavia species

- †G. brodkorbi Howard, 1978 (Late Miocene of Orange County, United States)
- †G. concinna Wetmore, 1940 (Late Miocene/Early Pliocene of west and east United States)
- †G. egeriana Švec, 1982 (Early Miocene of Czechoslovakia ?and Cheswold, Delaware, United States –? Yorktown Early Pliocene of Lee Creek Mine, North Carolina, United States)
- †G. fortis Olson & Rasmussen, 2001 (Yorktown Early Pliocene of Lee Creek Mine, North Carolina, United States)
- †G. howardae Brodkorb, 1953 (San Diego Formation, California and Yorktown Formation, North Carolina
- †G. moldavica Kessler, 1984 (Late Miocene of Chişinău, Moldova)
- †G. palaeodytes Wetmore, 1943 (Bone Valley Early/Middle Pliocene of Pierce, Florida, United States) (Note: Known from a few limb bones. Roughly similar in size to Pacific loon, but proportions seem to differ and apparently not close to any living species except maybe red-throated loon)
- †G. paradoxa Umanska, 1981 (Late Miocene of Čebotarevka, Ukraine)
- †G. schultzi Mlíkovský, 1998 (Middle Miocene of Sankt Margarethen, Austria)

List of fossil Gavia specimens

- Gavia sp. (Early-Middle Miocene of eastern United States) (Note: A tiny loon, smaller and more delicate than even the sympatric contemporary G. egeriana-like birds. Probably a distinct species – sexual dimorphism in loons is not very pronounced)
- Gavia sp. (Calvert Middle Miocene ?or Pleistocene of Maryland, United States) – same as Gavia cf. immer below? (Note: Smaller than common loon; the polished-bone look and large size of the specimen makes a Miocene origin rather unlikely)
- Gavia spp. (Middle Miocene of Steinheim, Germany) – three species
- Gavia sp. (Early Pliocene of Empoli, Italy) (Note: Known from a skull very similar to the black-throated loon. Initially assigned to G. concinna, but this is not very likely.)
- Gavia sp. (Early Pliocene of Kerč Peninsula, Ukraine)
- Gavia cf. concinna (San Diego Middle/Late Pliocene of San Diego, California, United States) – two species? (Note: Initially in part (specimens LACM 2110, 2142) assigned to G. concinna, but apparently one or two undescribed smaller species, about the size of the Pacific loon)
- Gavia sp. (Early Pleistocene of Kairy, Ukraine)
- Gavia cf. immer (Pleistocene of California and Florida, United States) – possibly a G. immer paleosubspecies

"Gavia" portisi from the Late Pliocene of Orciano Pisano, Italy, is known from a cervical vertebra that may or may not have been from a loon. If so, it was from a bird slightly smaller than the common loon. Older authors were quite sure the bone was indeed from a Gavia and even considered G. concinna a possibly junior synonym of it. This is now regarded as rather unlikely due to the quite distinct range and age. The Early Pliocene Gavia skull from Empoli (Italy) was referred to G. concinna, and thus could conceivably have been of "G." portisi if that was indeed a loon. The holotype vertebra may now be lost, which would make "G." portisi a nomen dubium.

== In popular culture ==
- Various Indigenous myths from the California region have a recurring figure, Loon or Loon Woman, based on the common loon.
- The Tlingit of Alaska believe that loon cries forecast rain. Gaǥeit is named after the common loon (kagit).
- The common loon is the provincial bird of Ontario and is depicted on the Canadian one-dollar coin, which has come to be known affectionately as the "loonie".
- The common loon is the official state bird of Minnesota.
- During Operation Metro Surge in Minnesota in 2026, an emblem combining a loon with the Rebel Alliance insignia from Star Wars became a widespread symbol of resistance to occupation by United States Immigration and Customs Enforcement.
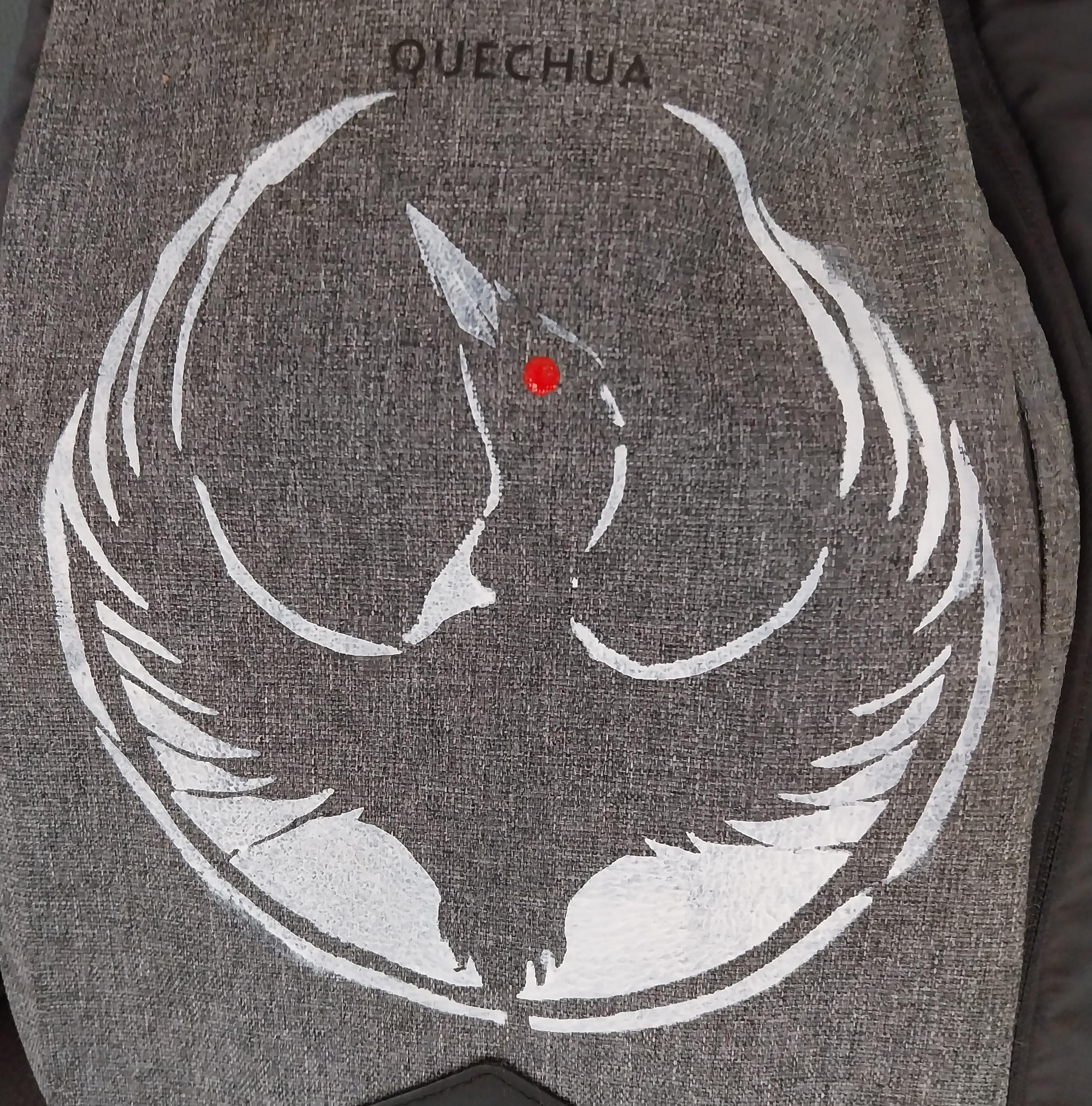
- A derivative work of the Minnesota's Rebel Loon symbol
  Mercer, Wisconsin, promotes itself as the "Loon Capital of the World".
- Henry David Thoreau describes a playful and inspiring acquaintance with a loon on Walden Pond in his book Walden.
- The Great Lakes Loons are a minor-league professional baseball team based in Midland, Michigan, United States. The primary mascot is Lou E. Loon.
- The Warner Bros./Amblin cartoon Tiny Toon Adventures features Shirley the Loon, who speaks with a thick Valley girl accent and is obsessed with superficial New Age paraphernalia. She is voiced by Saturday Night Live cast member Gail Matthius.
- The Major League Soccer club Minnesota United FC use a loon in the club's crest, and as a nickname for the team.
- Thanks to its inclusion as a preset in the E-mu Emulator, a specific sample of a Canadian loon, notably heard in "Sueño Latino" (1989) and in 808 State's "Pacific State" (1989), has become a recurring motif in electronic-based popular music.
- The town of Lincoln, Maine holds an annual "LoonFest" in Mid-July that coincides with the peak season for loons' reproductive cycle.
- In Rachel Reid's 2019 sports romance novel Heated Rivalry, Ilya Rozanov hears a loon and mistakes the call for that of a wolf, flinching in fear and calling it a "stupid Canadian wolf bird". In its 2022 sequel The Long Game, he gets a loon tattoo. The scene appeared in the episode "The Cottage" in Heated Rivalry, Crave's television adaptation of the novels.

== Bibliography ==
- Brodkorb, Pierce (1953). "A Review of the Pliocene Loons" (PDF). Condor. 55 (4): 211–14. doi:10.2307/1364769. JSTOR 1364769.
- Brodkorb, Pierce (1963). "Catalogue of fossil birds. Part 1 (Archaeopterygiformes through Ardeiformes)". Bulletin of the Florida State Museum, Biological Sciences. 7 (4): 179–293.
- Mayr, Gerald (2004). "A partial skeleton of a new fossil loon (Aves, Gaviiformes) from the early Oligocene of Germany with preserved stomach content" (PDF). J. Ornithol. 145 (4): 281–86. Bibcode:2004JOrni.145..281M. doi:10.1007/s10336-004-0050-9. S2CID 1070943. Archived from the original (PDF) on 24 September 2015.
- Mayr, Gerald (2009). Paleogene Fossil Birds. Heidelberg/New York: Springer-Verlag. ISBN 978-3-540-89627-2.
- Mlíkovský, Jirí (2002). Cenozoic Birds of the World, Part 1: Europe (PDF). Prague: Ninox Press. Archived from the original (PDF) on 2 March 2016.
- Montana Fish, Wildlife & Parks (Montana FW&P) (2007): Animal Field Guide: Common Loon; retrieved 2007-05-12.
- Olson, Storrs L. (1985). "Section X.I. Gaviiformes" (PDF). In Farner, D.S.; King, J.R.; Parkes, Kenneth C. (eds.). Avian Biology. Vol. 8. pp. 212–14.
- Rasmussen, Pamela C. (1998). "Early Miocene Avifauna from the Pollack Farm Site, Delaware" (PDF). Delaware Geological Survey Special Publication. 21: 149–51. Archived from the original (PDF) on 23 September 2015.
- Sprengelmeyer, Quentin D (April 2014). A PHYLOGENETIC REEVALUATION OF THE GENUS GAVIA (AVES: GAVIIFORMES) USING NEXT-GENERATION SEQUENCING (Thesis). Northern Michigan University.
- Storer, Robert W. (1956). "The Fossil Loon, Colymboides minutus" (PDF). Condor. 58 (6): 413–426. Bibcode:1956Condo..58..413S. doi:10.2307/1365096. JSTOR 1365096.
- Wetmore, Alexander (1941). "An Unknown Loon from the Miocene Fossil Beds of Maryland" (PDF). Auk. 58 (4): 567. doi:10.2307/4078641. JSTOR 4078641.
- United States Fish and Wildlife Service (USFWS) (2005): Common Loons at Seney NWR (June 2005), fws.gov; accessed July 6, 2017.

=== Recordings ===
- Voices of the Loon, Robert J. Lurtsema, narrator. recorded by William E. Barklow. North American Loon Fund/National Audubon Society. (1980)
