= Luciana, Fauglia =

Luciana
- Frazione
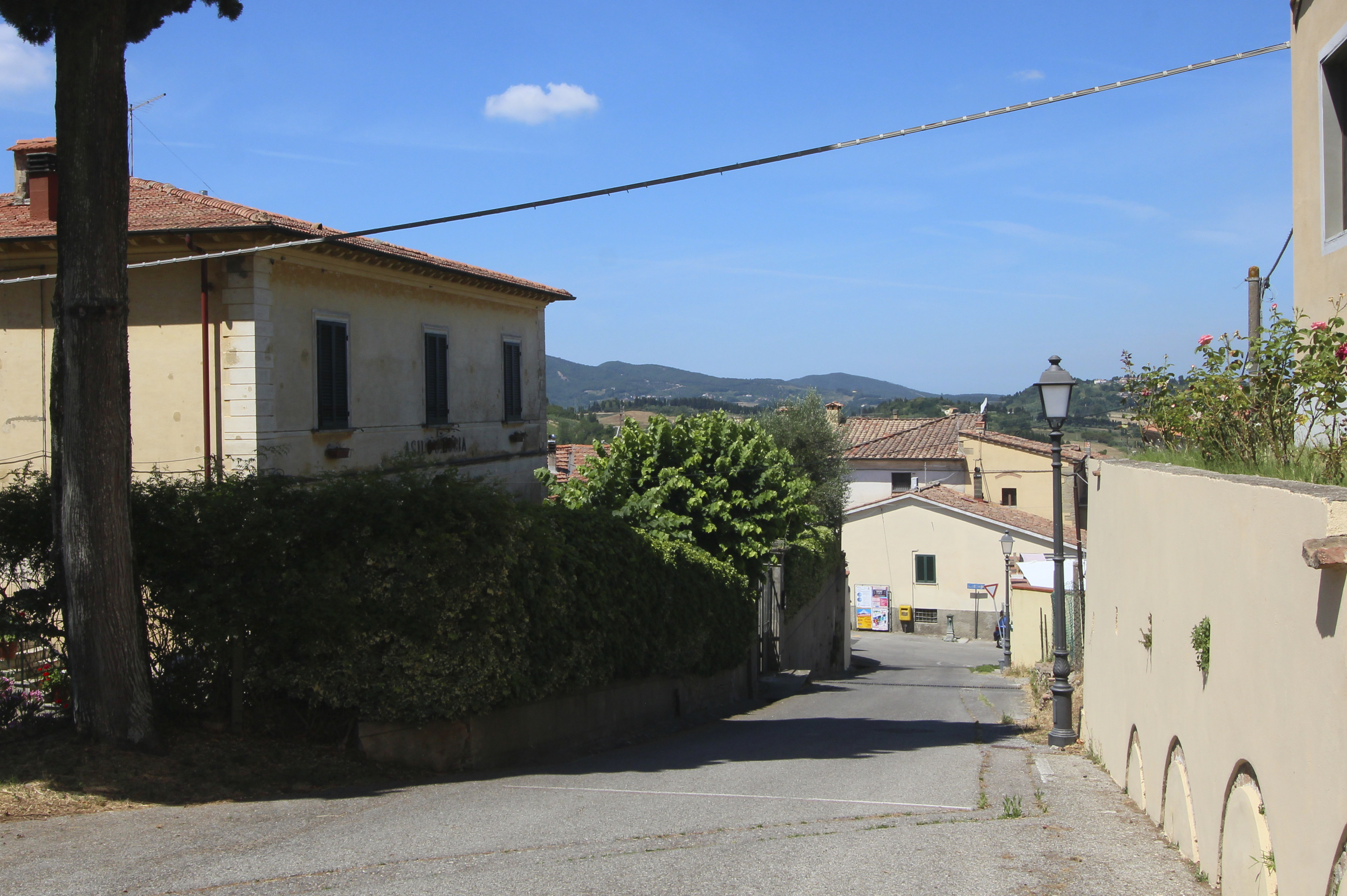

- Location of Luciana in Italy
- Coordinates: 43°32′47″N 10°29′49″E
- Country: Italy
- Region: Tuscany
- Province: Pisa (PI)
- Comune: Fauglia
- Elevation: 112 m (367 ft)

Population (2011)
  - Total: 333
- Time zone: UTC+1 (CET)
  - Summer (DST): UTC+2 (CEST)
- Postal code: 56043
- Dialing code: (+39) 050

Luciana is a village in Tuscany, central Italy, administratively a frazione of the comune of Fauglia, province of Pisa. At the time of the 2001 census its population was 317.

Luciana is about 25 km from Pisa and 5 km from Fauglia.
