= Pastina, Santa Luce =

Pastina
- Frazione
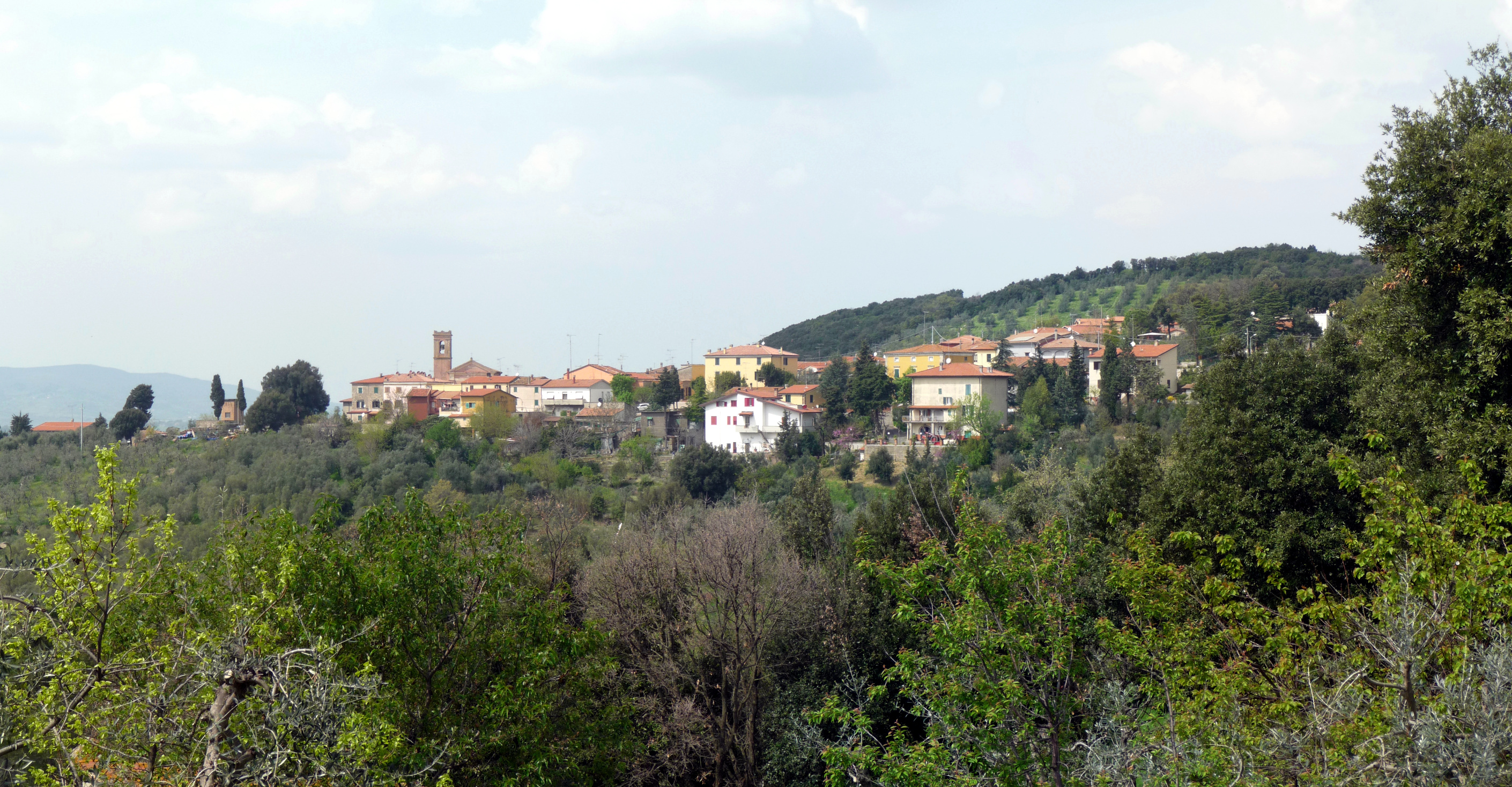

- Location of Pastina in Italy
- Coordinates: 43°27′36″N 10°33′46″E
- Country: Italy
- Region: Tuscany
- Province: Pisa (PI)
- Comune: Santa Luce
- Elevation: 215 m (705 ft)

Population (2011)
  - Total: 326
- Time zone: UTC+1 (CET)
  - Summer (DST): UTC+2 (CEST)
- Postal code: 56040
- Dialing code: (+39) 050

Pastina is a village in Tuscany, central Italy, administratively a frazione of the comune of Santa Luce, province of Pisa. At the time of the 2001 census its population was 284.

Pastina is about 45 km from Pisa and 2 km from Santa Luce.
