= Valtriano =

- Frazione
- Location of Valtriano in Italy
- Coordinates: 43°36′29″N 10°30′40″E
- Country: Italy
- Region: Tuscany
- Province: Pisa (PI)
- Comune: Fauglia
- Elevation: 11 m (36 ft)

Population (2011)
  - Total: 467
- Time zone: UTC+1 (CET)
  - Summer (DST): UTC+2 (CEST)
- Postal code: 56043
- Dialing code: (+39) 050

Valtriano is a village in Tuscany, central Italy, administratively a frazione of the comune of Fauglia, province of Pisa. At the time of the 2001 census its population was 334.

Valtriano is about 25 km from Pisa and 6 km from Fauglia.
