= Orciano Pisano =

Comune in Tuscany, Italy

- Comune
- Comune di Orciano Pisano
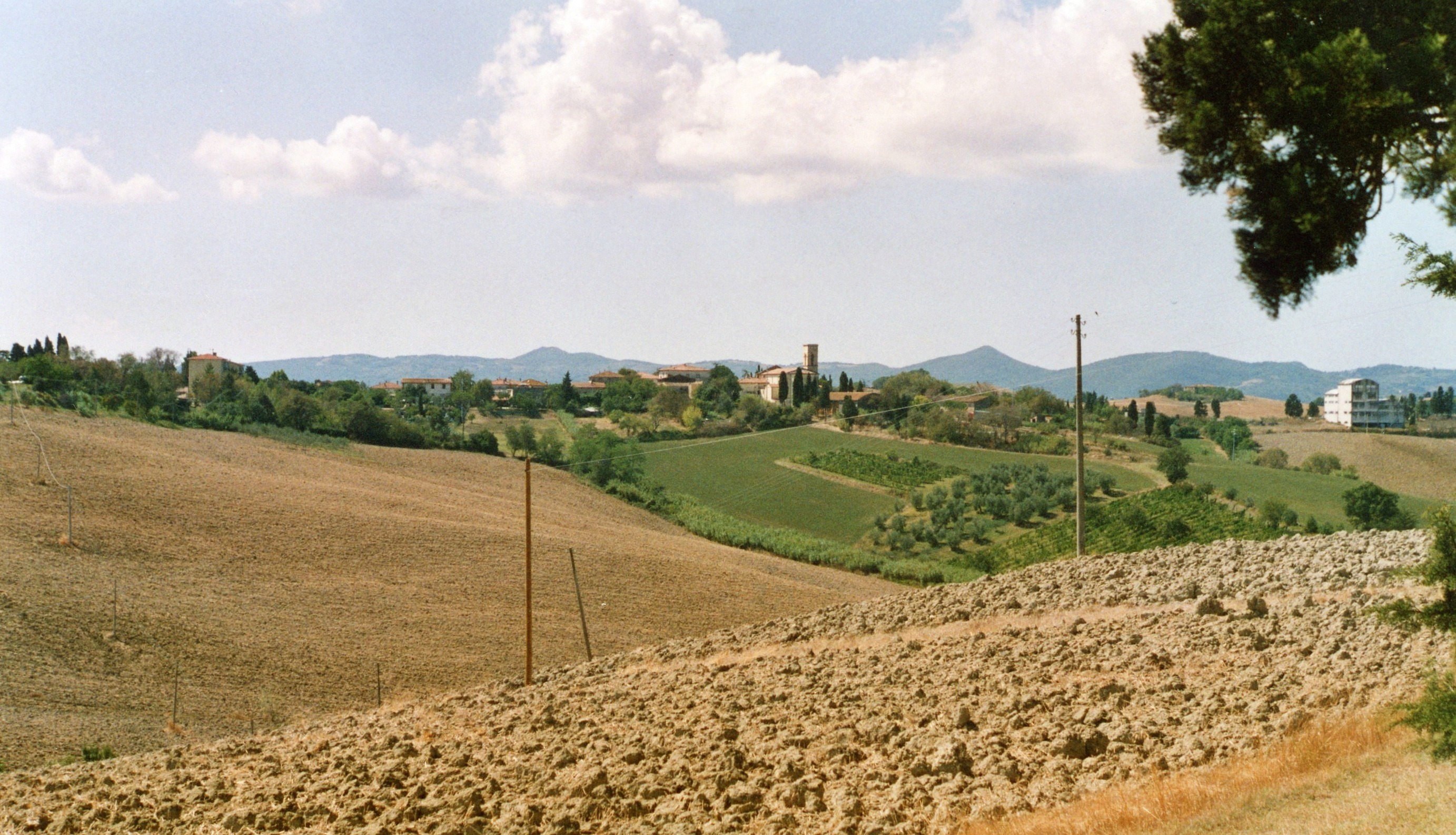

- Coat of arms

- Location within Italy Location within Tuscany
- Coordinates: 43°30′N 10°31′E
- Country: Italy
- Region: Tuscany
- Province: Pisa (PI)

Government
  - Mayor: Giuliana Menci Filippi

Area
  - Total: 11.6 km^{2} (4.5 sq mi)
- Elevation: 122 m (400 ft)

Population (Dec. 2004)
  - Total: 599
  - Density: 51.6/km^{2} (134/sq mi)
- Demonym: Orcianesi
- Time zone: UTC+1 (CET)
  - Summer (DST): UTC+2 (CEST)
- Postal code: 56040
- Dialing code: 050
- Patron saint: St. Michael Archangel
- Saint day: September 29
- Website: Official website

Orciano Pisano is a comune (municipality) in the Province of Pisa in the Italian region Tuscany, located about 70 kilometres (43 mi) southwest of Florence and about 25 kilometres (16 mi) southeast of Pisa, in the Pisan Hills.

Orciano Pisano borders the following municipalities: Collesalvetti, Fauglia, Lorenzana, Rosignano Marittimo, Santa Luce.

Orciano's area, up to Volterra, is rich of findings of fossils from marine vertebrates, such as whales, sharks and seals, such as the Pliophoca etrusca discovered in 1875 by Roberto Lawley. Remains of a blue whale living 4 millions year ago, found here, are now in the Museum of Natural History of the University of Florence. Other Cetacean fossils from Orciano Pisano are held by Museo di storia naturale e del territorio dell'Università di Pisa.
