= Acciaiolo =

- Frazione
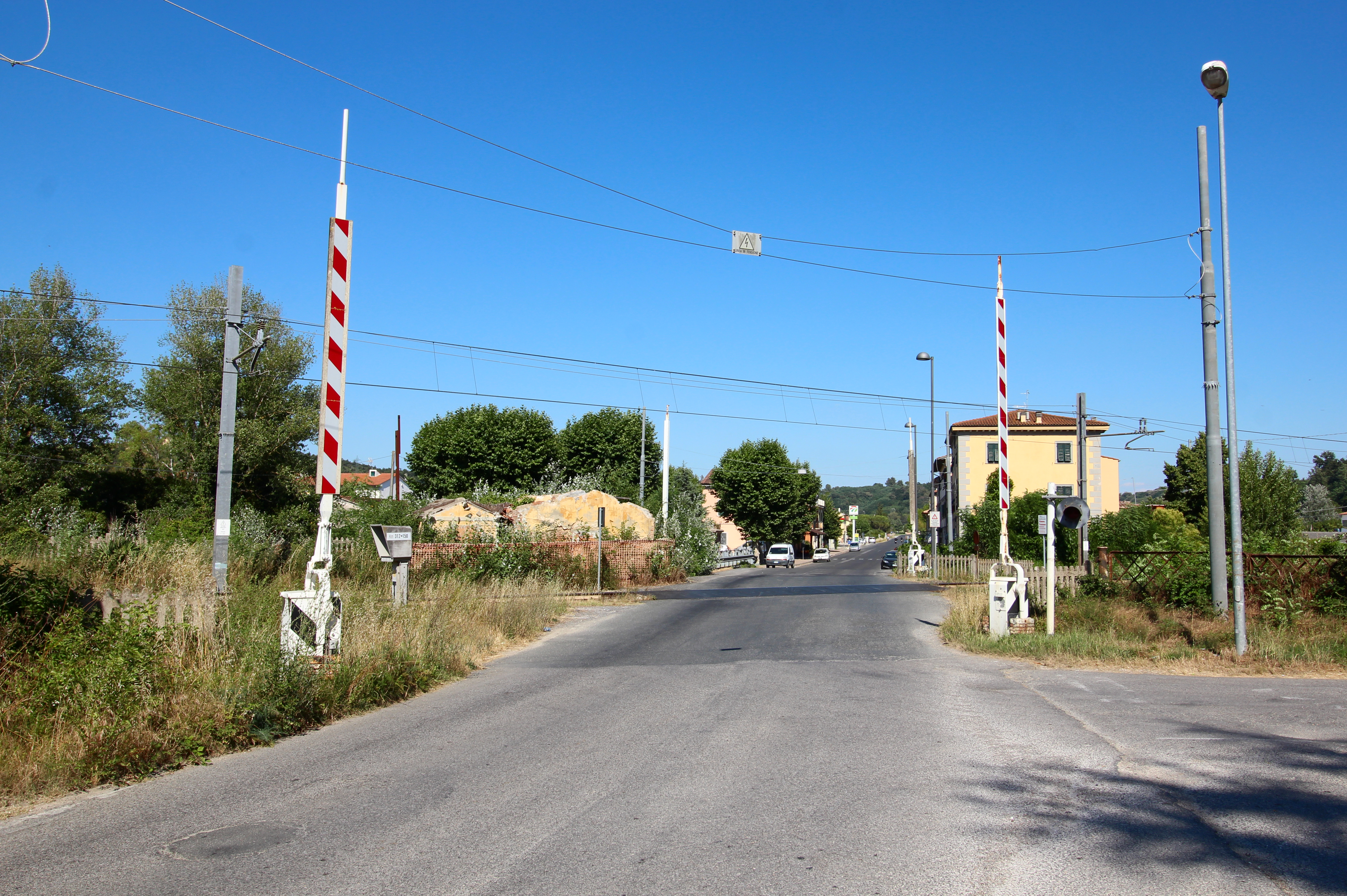

- Location of Acciaiolo in Italy
- Coordinates: 43°33′3″N 10°30′26″E
- Country: Italy
- Region: Tuscany
- Province: Pisa (PI)
- Comune: Fauglia
- Elevation: 34 m (112 ft)

Population (2011)
  - Total: 219
- Time zone: UTC+1 (CET)
  - Summer (DST): UTC+2 (CEST)
- Postal code: 56043
- Dialing code: (+39) 050

Acciaiolo is a village in Tuscany, central Italy, administratively a frazione of the comune of Fauglia, province of Pisa. At the time of the 2001 census its population was 213.

Acciaiolo is about 26 km (16 mi) from Pisa and 3 km (1.9 mi) from Fauglia.
