= Pieve Santa Luce =

- Frazione
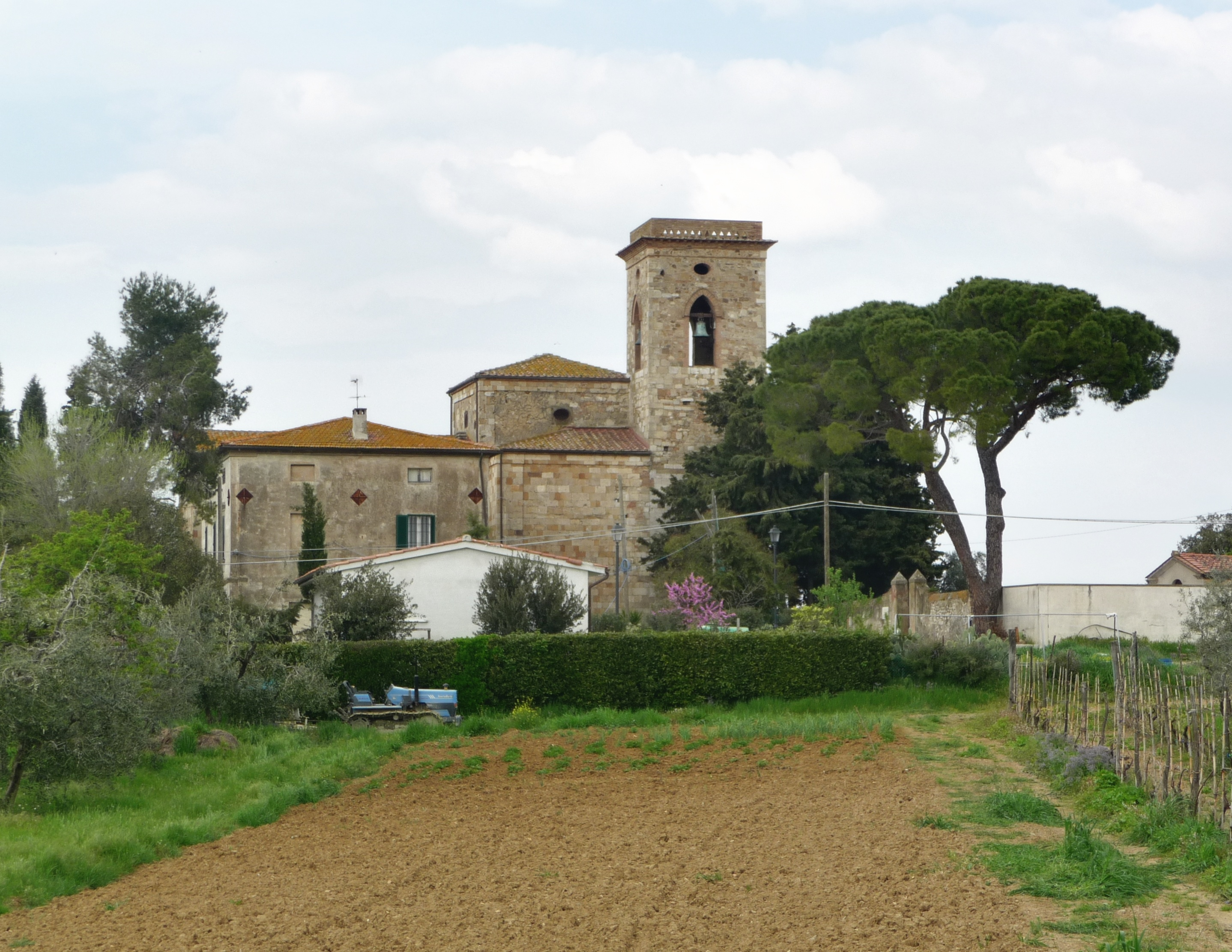
- The old pieve in Pieve Santa Luce

- Location of Pieve Santa Luce in Italy
- Coordinates: 43°28′52″N 10°32′43″E
- Country: Italy
- Region: Tuscany
- Province: Pisa (PI)
- Comune: Santa Luce
- Elevation: 146 m (479 ft)

Population (2011)
  - Total: 97
- Time zone: UTC+1 (CET)
  - Summer (DST): UTC+2 (CEST)
- Postal code: 56040
- Dialing code: (+39) 050

Pieve Santa Luce is a village in Tuscany, central Italy, administratively a frazione of the comune of Santa Luce, province of Pisa. At the time of the 2001 census its population was 97.

Pieve Santa Luce is about 45 km from Pisa and 3 km from Santa Luce.
