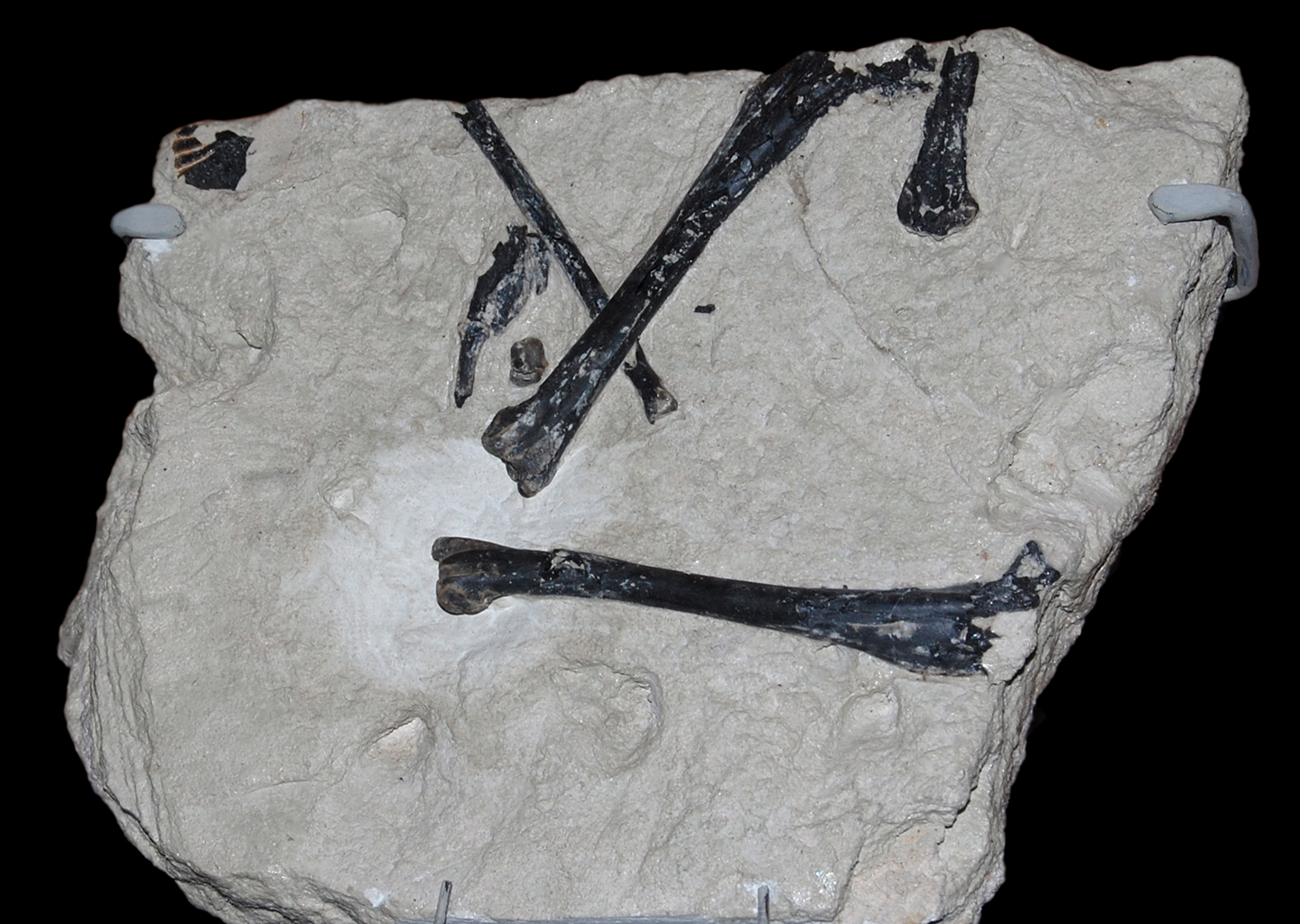
- Wing elements of Gavia schultzi preserved on Slab B

Scientific classification
- Domain: Eukaryota
- Kingdom: Animalia
- Phylum: Chordata
- Class: Aves
- Order: Gaviiformes
- Family: Gaviidae
- Genus: Gavia
- Species: †G. schultzi

Binomial name
- †Gavia schultzi Mlíkovský, 1998

= Gavia schultzi =

Gavia schultzi Temporal range: Middle Miocene

Extinct species of loon

Gavia schultzi is an extinct species of loon from the Middle Miocene of Austria. It is amongst the oldest known species in the genus and larger than the older Gavia egeriana from the Early Miocene Czech Republic.

== Discovery and naming ==
The remains of Gavia schultzi was discovered in 1986 by a private collector that later donated the specimens to the Natural History Museum Vienna. Four slabs of rock containing the bones of Gavia schultzi are known in addition to more free remains. The type specimen, slab A, contains the right coracoid. A second slab preserves several bones of both wings while a third only contains the end of the right humerus and part of the opposing ulna. The final slab contains only a fragment of the right ulna. In addition to these bones encased in rock, a loose element of the left ulna is also known. Although not certain, it is possible that all these remains belong to a single animal. All remains stem from a locality close to the town of Sankt Margarethen im Burgenland. They date to the Badenian stage of the Miocene.

The species was named by Czech paleontologist and ornithologist Jiří Mlíkovský in 1998. The name honors Ortwin Schultz for his contributions to Austrian paleontology.

== Description ==
Gavia schultzi was larger than the older Gavia egeriana, but smaller than Gavia moldavica. The distal end of the humerus in this species is notably less robust than in the modern members of the genus, a trait it shares with Gavia egeriana. It however differs from the older species in the details of that bone. The ventral epicondylus (where the humerus connects to the forearm) features larger but less distinct attachment points for ligament. Meanwhile, the supracondylar tuberculum is ventrally larger, but with less distinct margins. The area where the coracoid borders the sternum is concave, which sets Gavia schultzi apart from Petralca austriaca, another gaviiform from Austria.

== Paleoenvironment ==
The rock units Gavia schultzi was recovered from indicate that it lived in a marine environment. Several fish remains have also been found there.
