= Santa Luce =

- Comune
- Comune di Santa Luce
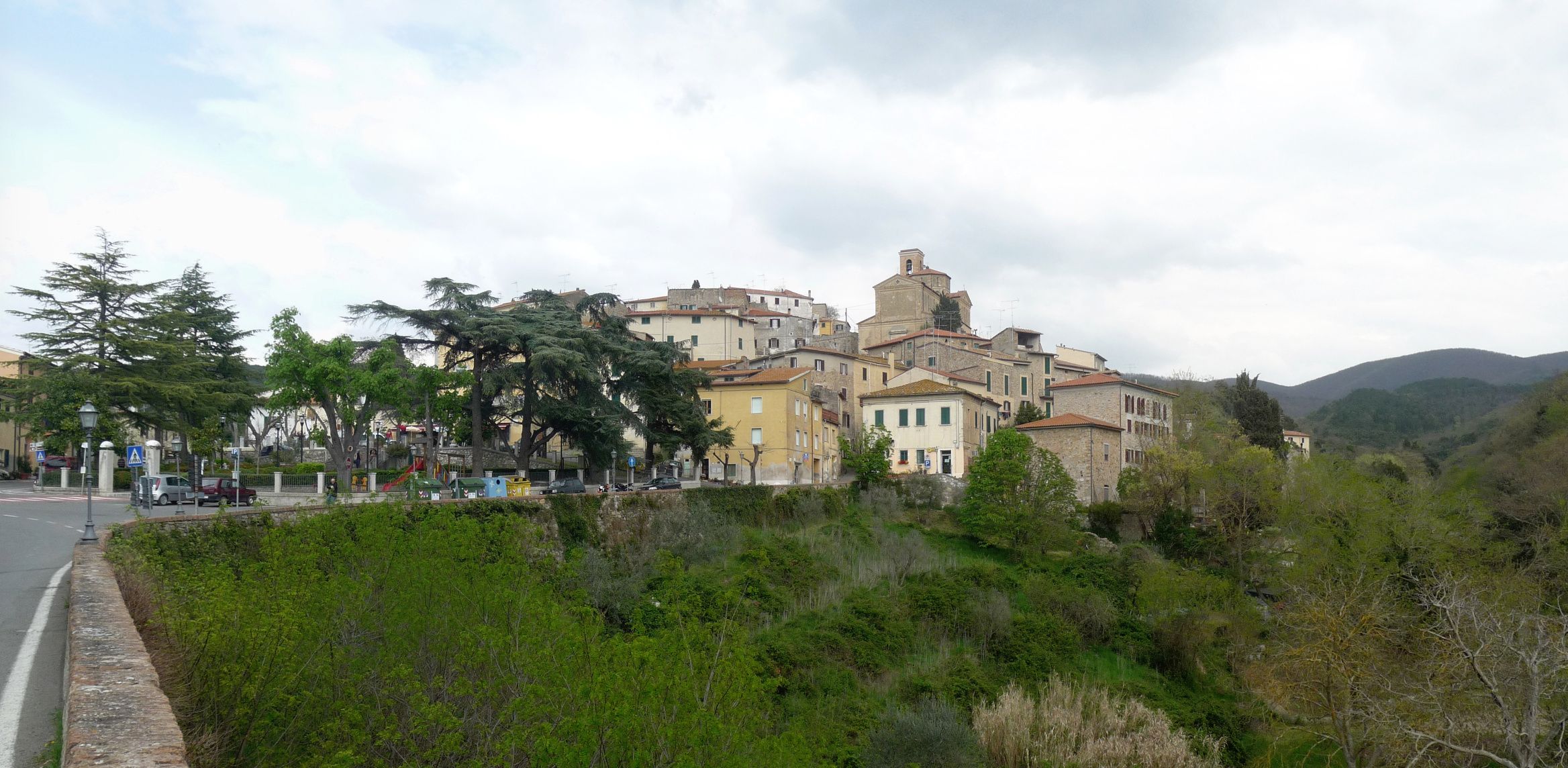

- Coat of arms

- Location within Italy Location within Tuscany
- Coordinates: 43°28′N 10°34′E
- Country: Italy
- Region: Tuscany
- Province: Pisa (PI)
- Frazioni: Pastina, Pieve Santa Luce, Pomaia

Government
  - Mayor: Andrea Marini

Area
  - Total: 66.6 km^{2} (25.7 sq mi)
- Elevation: 200 m (660 ft)

Population (2009)
  - Total: 1,683
  - Density: 25.3/km^{2} (65.4/sq mi)
- Demonym: Santalucesi
- Time zone: UTC+1 (CET)
  - Summer (DST): UTC+2 (CEST)
- Postal code: 56040
- Dialing code: 050
- Patron saint: St. Lucy
- Saint day: 13 December

Santa Luce is a comune (municipality) in the Province of Pisa in the Italian region Tuscany, located about 70 kilometres (43 miles) southwest of Florence and about 30 kilometres (19 mi) southeast of Pisa.
