= Lorenzana =

- Frazione
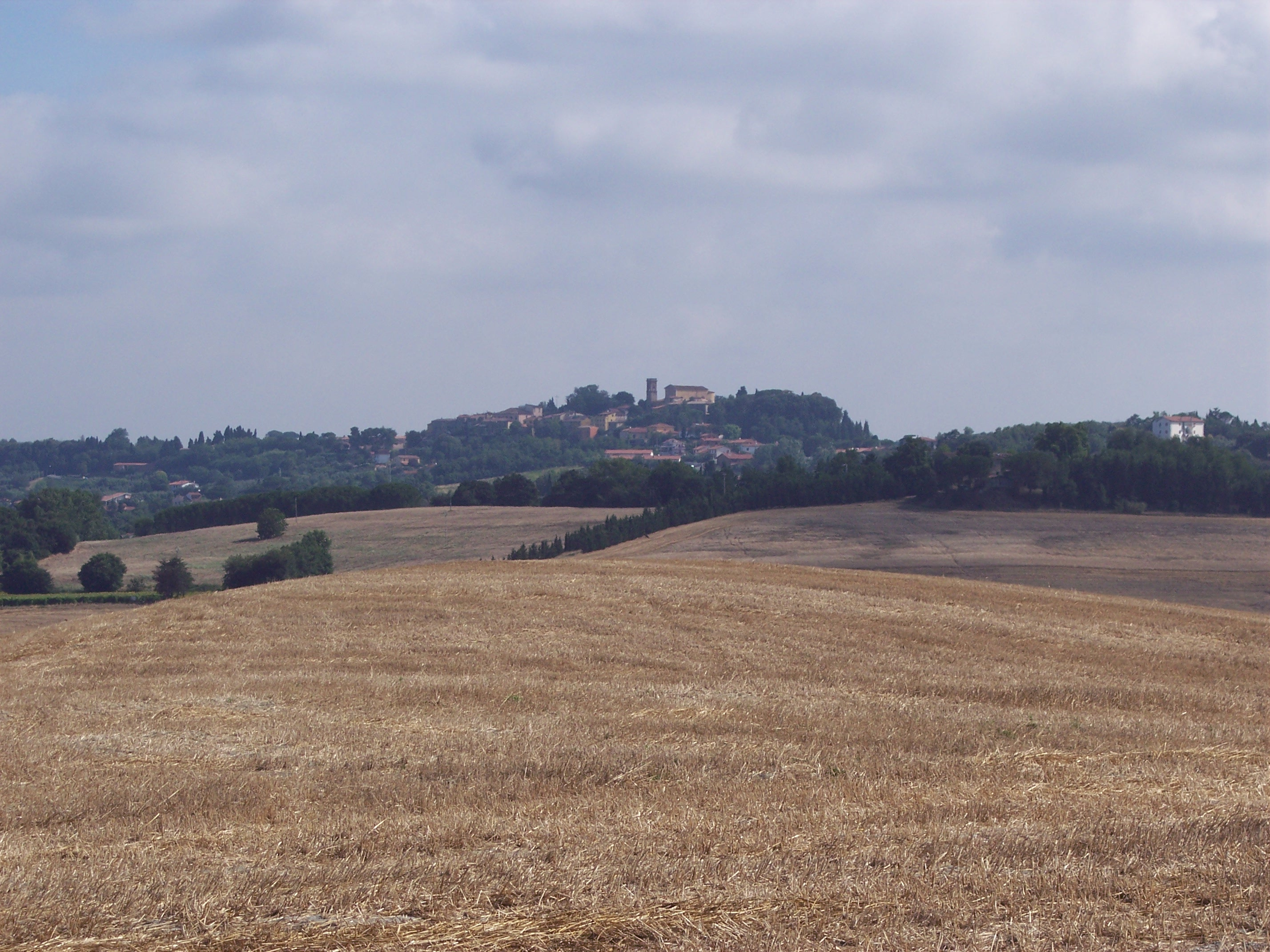

- Location of Lorenzana in Italy
- Coordinates: 43°32′N 10°32′E
- Country: Italy
- Region: Tuscany
- Province: Pisa (PI)
- Comune: Crespina Lorenzana
- Elevation: 127 m (417 ft)

Population (2011)
  - Total: 329
- Demonym: Lorenzanesi
- Time zone: UTC+1 (CET)
  - Summer (DST): UTC+2 (CEST)
- Postal code: 56040
- Dialing code: 050

Lorenzana is a frazione (hamlet) in the comune of Crespina Lorenzana, in the Province of Pisa in the Italian region Tuscany. It is located about 60 kilometres (37 miles) southwest of Florence and about 25 kilometres (16 miles) southeast of Pisa.

== History ==
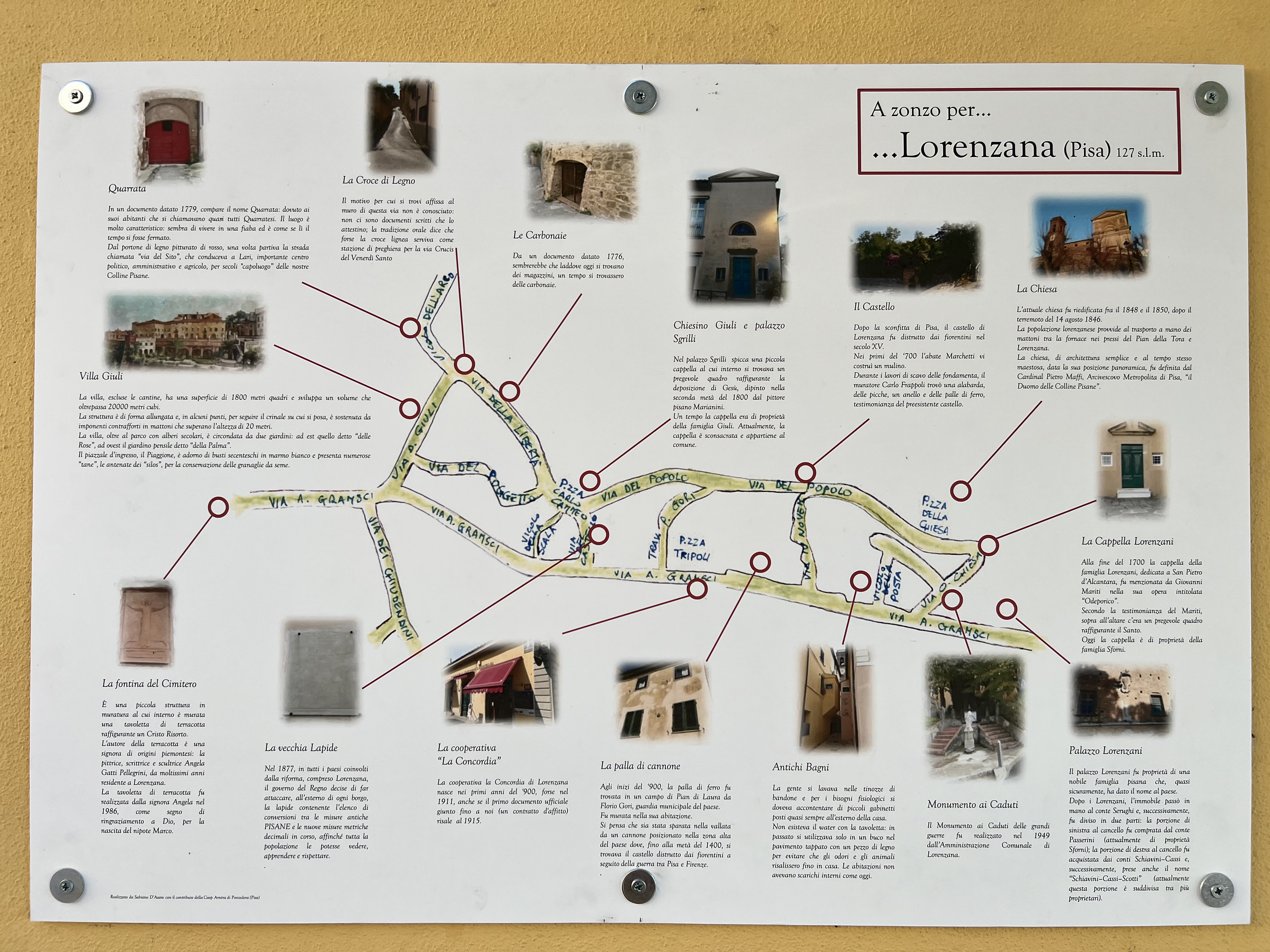
A stroll around Lorenzana, as displayed on the side of the Osteria dei Vecchi Sapori

The inhabitants are known as Lorenzanesi. Economic activity is agricultural primarily based on cereals, wine and olives. From the earliest records the village was managed under the jurisdiction of the Archbishop of Pisa. In 1406 when the Republic of Pisa collapsed, the village fell under the Republic of Florence. In 1783 control passed to Pietro Leopoldo of Lorena and this persisted until the Unification of Italy in 1861.

The church of Bartholomew the Apostle and Saint Christopher dates back to 1850, when it was rebuilt in neoclassical forms after being demolished by the earthquake of 14 August 1846, which caused destruction throughout the area.

== Villa Giuli ==
One of the main buildings in the village is Villa Giuli, also known as the Villa or Palazzo di Lorenzana. The villa is mentioned in 1521, but its main development took place in the 18th century by Ferdinando Giuli and then in second half of the 19th century with Domenico Giuli. Excluding the cellars it has an area of 1,800 square metres (19,000 sq ft). It is elongated, following the ridge on which it rests, and is supported by imposing brick buttresses that exceed a height of 20 metres (66 ft). In addition to the park with secular trees, the villa is surrounded by two gardens: to the east the one called "delle Rose", to the west the hanging garden called "della Palma".

== Loranzana Castle ==
After the defeat of Pisa, Lorenzana castle was destroyed by the Florentines in the 15th century. In the early 1700s, Abbot Marchetti built a mill there.

== Lorenzana Palace ==
The Lorenzani palace was owned by a noble Pisan family who, almost certainly, gave the town its name. After the Lorenzani, the property passed into the hands of Count Serughi and was subsequently divided into two parts: the left portion of the gate was bought by Count Passerini (now owned by the Sforni family); the portion on the right of the gate was purchased by the Counts Schiavini-Cassi and, subsequently, also took the name "Schiavini-Cassi-Scotti" (now this portion is divided among several owners).

== Demographic evolution ==
Demography of the former comune of Lorenzana, abolished in 2014.

Historical population

Year	Pop.	±%
1861	1,444	—
1871	1,498	+3.7%
1881	1,494	−0.3%
1901	1,625	+8.8%
1911	1,709	+5.2%

Year	Pop.	±%
1921	1,719	+0.6%
1931	1,665	−3.1%
1936	1,722	+3.4%
1951	1,556	−9.6%
1961	1,279	−17.8%

Year	Pop.	±%
1971	934	−27.0%
1981	938	+0.4%
1991	1,030	+9.8%
2001	1,144	+11.1%

Source: Data from ISTAT
