= Crespina =

- Frazione
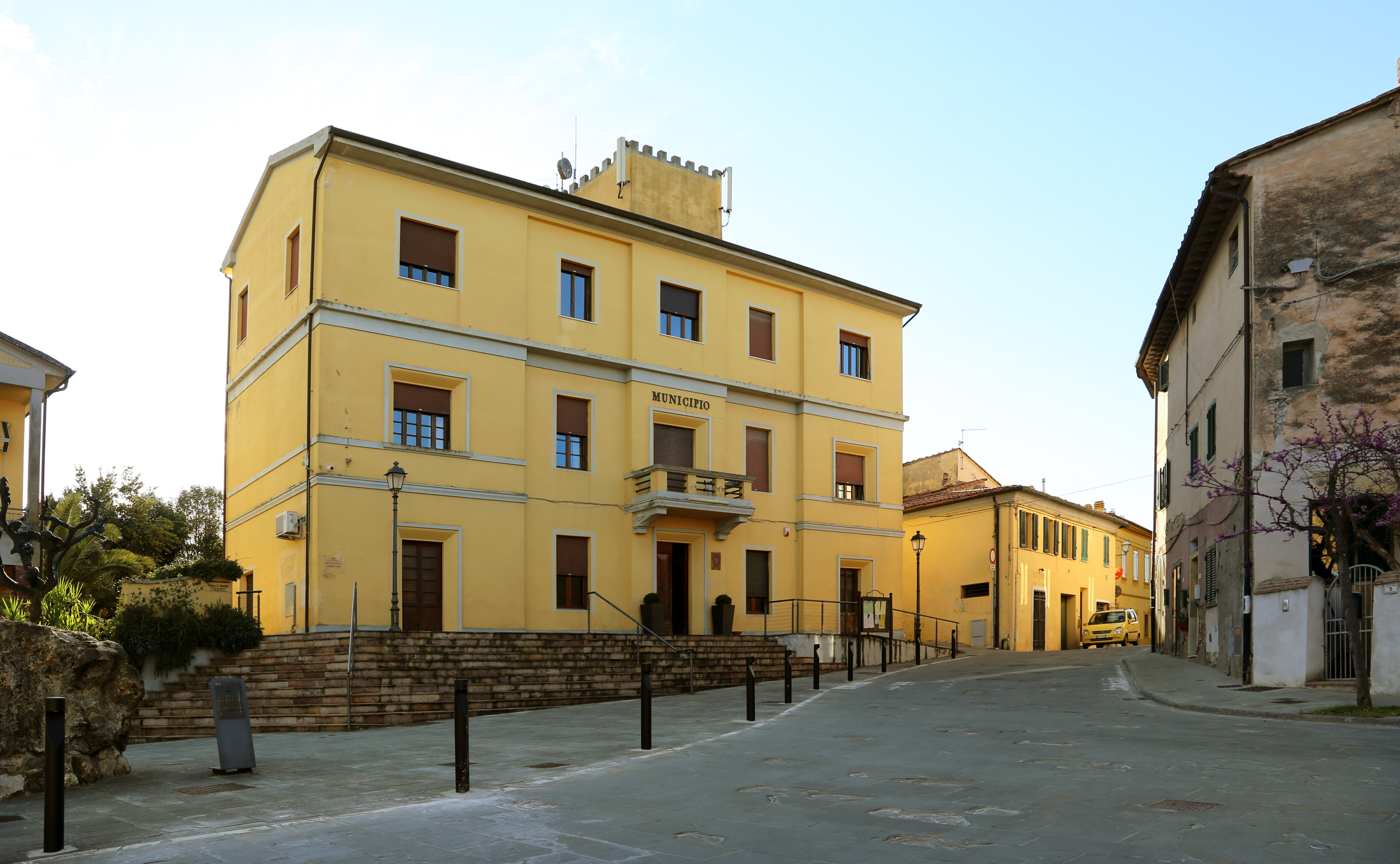
- Town Hall

- Location of Crespina in Italy
- Coordinates: 43°35′N 10°34′E
- Country: Italy
- Region: Tuscany
- Province: Pisa (PI)
- Comune: Crespina Lorenzana
- Elevation: 86 m (282 ft)

Population (2001)
  - Total: 640
- Time zone: UTC+1 (CET)
  - Summer (DST): UTC+2 (CEST)
- Postal code: 56042
- Dialing code: 050

Crespina is a frazione (hamlet) in the comune of Crespina Lorenzana, in the Province of Pisa in the Italian region Tuscany. It is located about 60 kilometres (37 mi) southwest of Florence and about 20 kilometres (12 mi) southeast of Pisa.

Crespina hosts the municipal seat of the comune.
