= ASD Casciana Pelli Sport =

Italian football club

Casciana Pelli
- Full name: Associazione Sportiva Dilettantistica; Casciana Pelli Sport
- Founded: 2011
- Dissolved: 2013
- Ground: Armando Picchi, Casciana Terme, Italy
- Capacity: 1,000
- 2012–13: Eccellenza Toscana, 16th
Home colours	Away colours

Associazione Sportiva Dilettantistica Casciana Pelli Sport or simply Casciana Pelli was an Italian association football club, based in Casciana Terme, Tuscany.

== History ==
=== Mobilieri Ponsacco ===
The origins of the team go back to 1920 when the former Mobilieri Ponsacco was founded in Ponsacco.

The club also enjoyed a professional spell during the 1946–47 and 1947–48 season and from 1989–90 to 1996–97 season.

Its most notable former player has been Daniele Balli.

==== F.C. Ponsacco 1920 ====
In the summer 2011, after the transfer to Santa Croce sull'Arno, the club was refounded as F.C. Ponsacco 1920 S.S.D. restarting from Terza Categoria Pisa.

=== From 2011 to 2013 ===
A.S.D. Pelli Santacroce Sport was founded in 2011 in Santa Croce sull'Arno after the merger of A.S.D. Mobilieri Ponsacco Calcio (playing in Serie D) and Giovanile Staffoli.

In the season 2011–12 it was relegated to Eccellenza.

In the summer 2012 it moved to Casciana Terme and was renamed A.S.D. Casciana Pelli Sport. In the 2012–13 season it was relegated to Promozione Toscana and dissolved.

== Colors and badge ==
The team's color was red and blue
