= Teresa Mattei =

Italian partisan and politician (1921–2013)

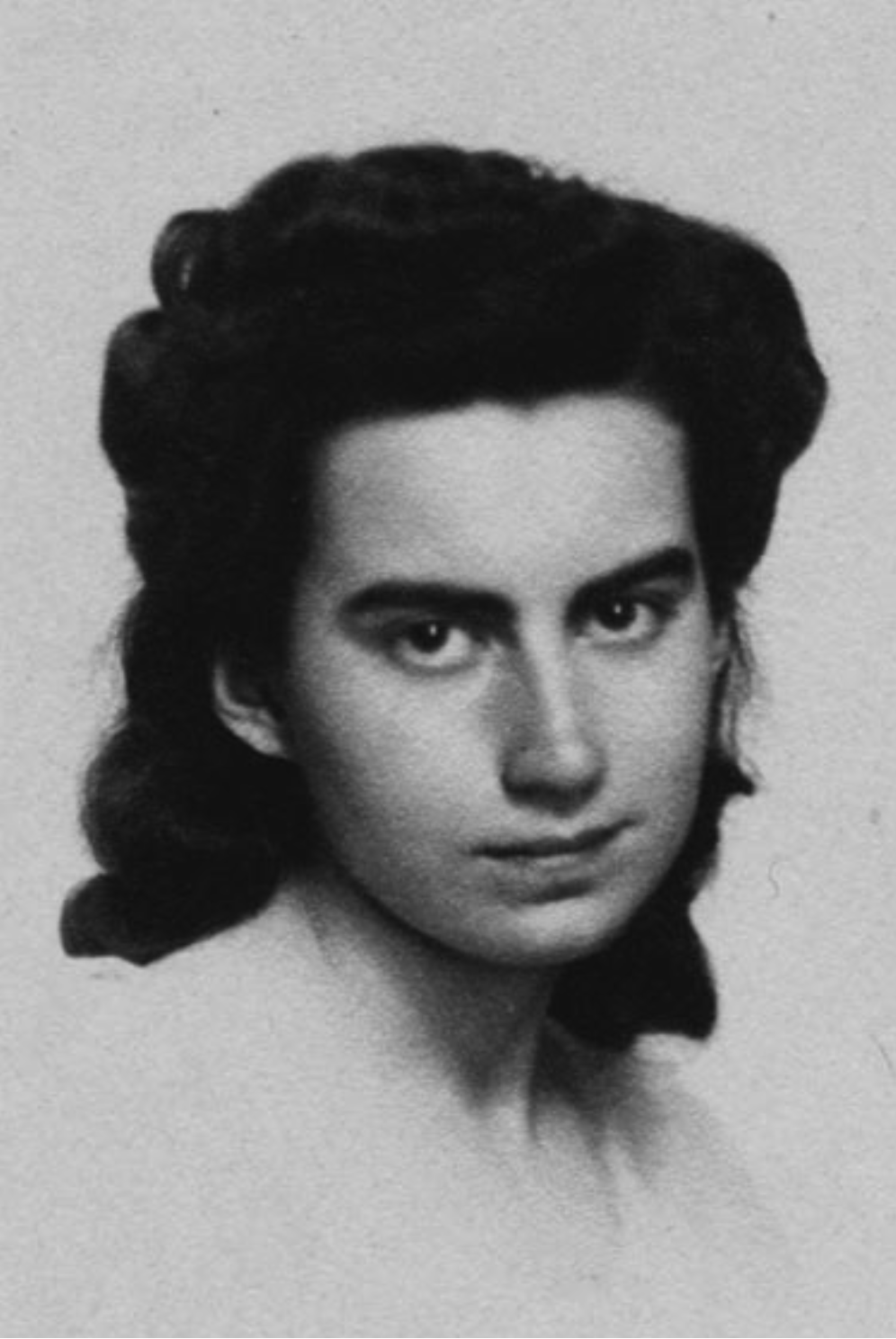
- Teresa Mattei in the 1940s

Member of the Constituent Assembly
- In office 25 June 1946 – 31 January 1948
- Constituency: Florence

Personal details
- Born: 1 February 1921 Genoa, Kingdom of Italy
- Died: 12 March 2013 (aged 92) Casciana Terme Lari, Italy
- Party: PCI (until 1957)
- Spouses: Bruno Sanguinetti (m. 1948; died 1950); Iacopo Muzio (m. 1952; sep. 1969)
- Children: 4, including Gianfranco Sanguinetti
- Education: University of Florence
- Occupation: Partisan; politician
- Profession: Teacher

Teresa "Teresita" Mattei (1 February 1921 – 12 March 2013) was an Italian partisan and politician.

== Early and personal life ==
Born in Genoa, in 1938 Mattei was expelled from all schools of the Kingdom of Italy for openly criticizing the racial laws during class. Graduating in philosophy at the University of Florence in 1944, she joined the partisans under the nom de guerre "Chicchi". She took part in the wartime assassination of Fascist minister and philosopher Giovanni Gentile.

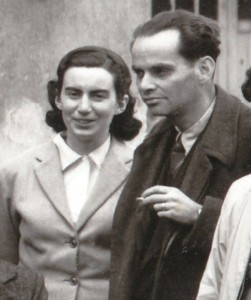
Mattei with her first husband, Bruno Sanguinetti, in the 1940s

She was briefly married to Bruno Sanguinetti, and they had a son, writer Gianfranco Sanguinetti.

== Career ==
After the war, Mattei was a candidate for the Italian Communist Party (PCI) to the Constituent Assembly, in which she served as a bureau secretary. Mattei was the youngest to be elected to the Constituent Assembly and was thus called "the girl of Montecitorio".

In 1957, Mattei was expelled from the Communist Party because of her opposition to Stalinism and to Palmiro Togliatti's politics. She later became national director of the Italian Women's Union (UDI) and introduced the use of mimosa for International Women's Day (IWD) at the request of Luigi Longo. Mattei felt that the French symbols of IWD, violets and lilies-of-the-valley, were too scarce and expensive to be used in poor, rural Italian areas, so she proposed the mimosa as an alternative.

== Death ==
Mattei died in Lari, Tuscany, aged 92, the last living female member of the Constituent Assembly of Italy.
