= Eusebio Valli =

Italian physician and scientist (1755–1816)

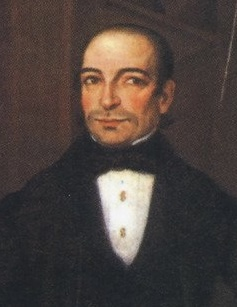
- Pronunciation: /ewˈzɛbjo valli/
- Born: 13 December 1755; Casciana Alta, Pisa, Italy
- Died: 24 September 1816 (aged 60); Havana, Cuba
- Burial place: Cristóbal Colón Cemetery

Eusebio Giacinto Valli (Casciana Alta, Casciana Terme Lari, Pisa, 13 December 1755 – Havana, 24 September 1816) was an Italian physician and scientist.

== Biography ==
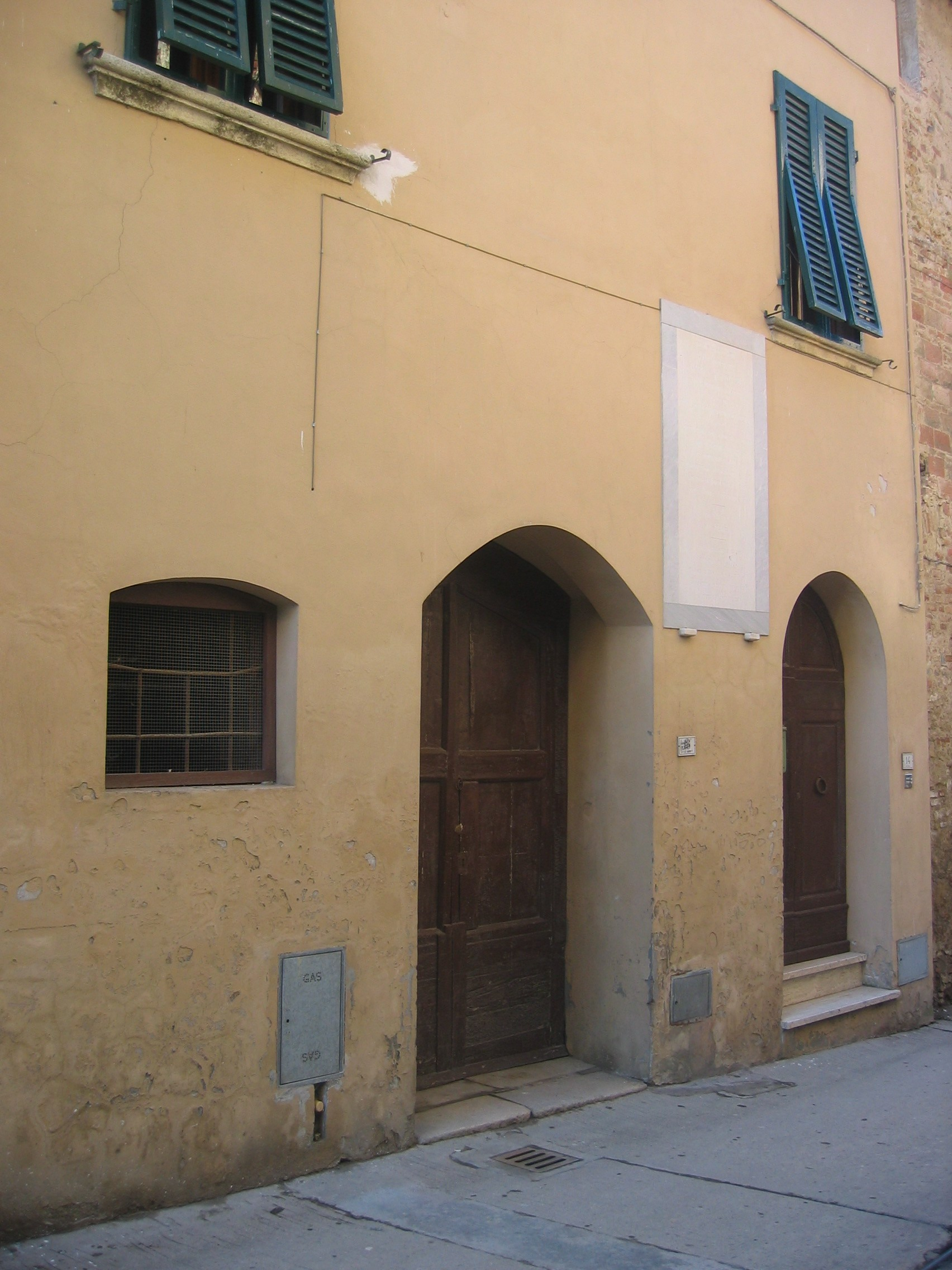
Eusebio Valli's paternal house, Casciana Alta, Casciana Terme Lari, Pisa, Italy, decorated with a big commemorative marble plaque

He was born in Casciana Alta, current district of the municipality of Casciana Terme Lari, Pisa, from an important Tuscan family originally from Ponsacco. His father was a distinguished physician named Giuseppe Valli and his mother was a woman named Anna Maria Jacoponi, whose family came from Casciana.

When he was five years old he was taken by his family to Monterchi, where his father worked as a local doctor and where he was educated by a local teacher, Ignazio Chiaverini, who taught him Italian and Latin until the age of 16, in order to prepare him for academic studies. The economic situation of his family didn't allow him to apply to the University of Pisa, where Jacopo-Filippo, one of Eusebio's siblings, was already studying. For this reason, in 1771 his father found himself forced to send to Leopold II, Holy Roman Emperor, Grand Duke of Tuscany, a letter in which he asked him to admit his son freely to the Collegio della Sapienza di Pisa (which later became today's Scuola Normale di Pisa):

(EN) «Royal Highness, Eusebio Valli, Florentine citizen, residing in Monterchi, servant and subject of H.R.H reverently exposes: how he wishes to apply himself to the studies of Philosophy and Medicine at the University of Pisa; but since his father does not have sufficient financial support to be able to keep him in that educational condition, he begs H.R.H to deign to confer him a place as a pupil at the Collego della Sapienza of that city...»	(IT) «Altezza Reale, Eusebio Valli, cittadino fiorentino, dimorante in Monterchi, servo e suddito dell’A.V.R. reverentemente espone: come desidera di applicarsi agli studi della Filosofia e della Medicina nell’Università di Pisa; ma siccome il di lui padre non ha assegnamenti sufficienti da poterlo mantenere in detti studi, così supplica l’A.V.R. a volersi degnare di conferirgli un posto di alunno nel collegio della Sapienza di detta città...»

Unfortunately there wasn't any vacant place there, so Eusebio, in order to contain familiar expenses, had to wait for his brother to graduate before being able to attend University. During his university years he stayed in a certain Mr. Domenico Cola's house, in via Santa Maria, Pisa, while his uncle, Michelangelo Valli, acted as his guarantor.

In 1783 he graduated in Medicine and Philosophy at the Collegio della Sapienza and in the following years he was called to work as a surgeon in various places. He went to Mantova where he was elected medico primario dello Spedal Civile and professor of Clinical Medicine. In Turkey, Greece and Egypt he studied the epidemiology of plague, smallpox and of a "certain malignant putrid fever" (probably malaria). Valli subsequently travelled to Dalmatia as a military doctor with the Franco-Italian army. Eusebio followed in the footsteps of great masters such as Luigi Galvani from whom he learned the art of physiology, of which the latter was the spokesperson, and Alessandro Volta, whose influence led Valli to study phenomena like “animal electricity” or “bioelectricity”. Eusebio Valli is considered the forerunner of vaccination, in fact through his numerous studies he heralded one of the medical techniques still used today, and was the first vaccinator to operate in several countries in the world.

He died in Havana in September 1816 after not injecting enough attenuated germs into his own body. After his death, numerous streets and squares have been dedicated to the great Eusebio Valli in Tuscany, and two large marble plaques commemorate him respectively in his birthplace in Casciana Alta and in his paternal house in Ponsacco. His tomb, situated in the Cristóbal Colón Cemetery, bears the epigraph: “victima de su amor à la humanidad" ("a victim of his love for humanity").

== Scientific activity ==
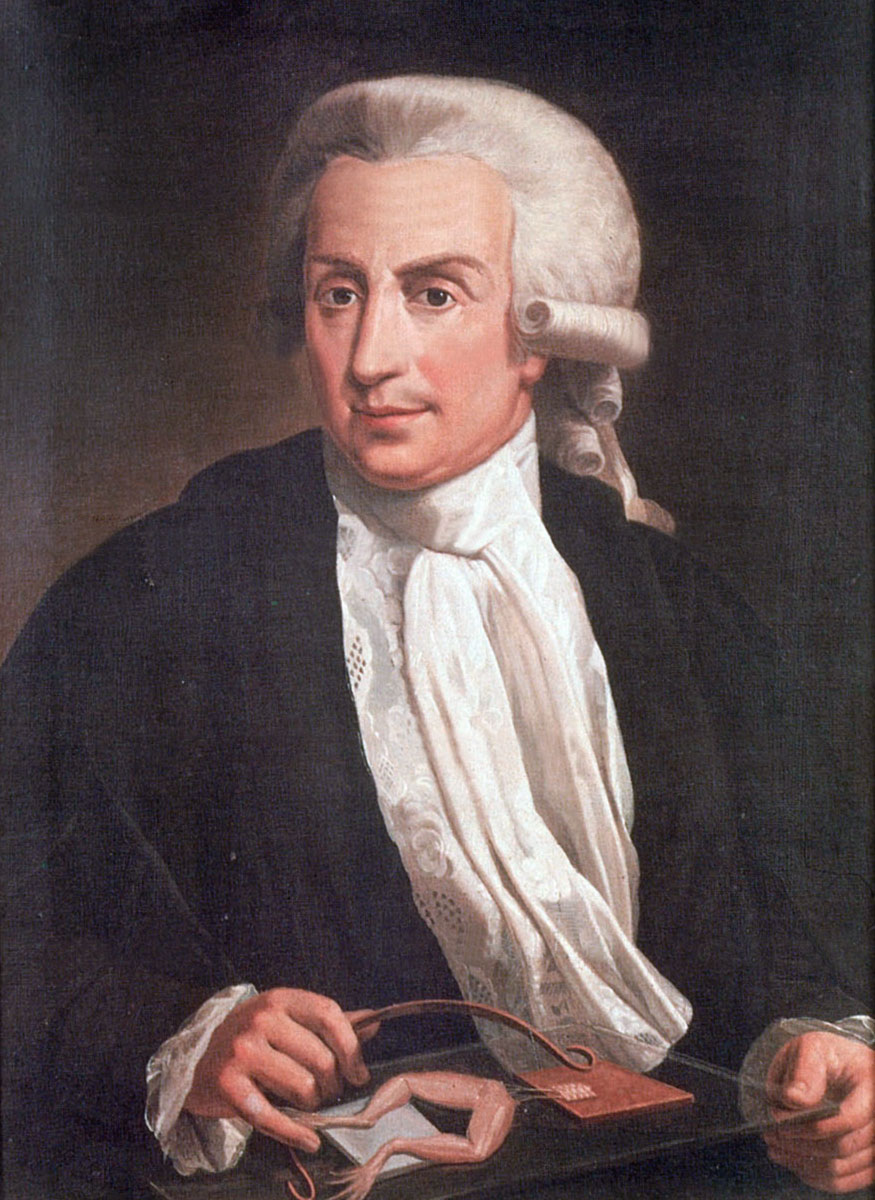
Luigi Galvani

Eusebio Valli's passion for physics and chemistry, applied to the human body, led him to conduct numerous studies and multiple discoveries. In 1781, he discovered the anti-fermentation action of the red precipitate in wine preparation.

During his stays in the Middle East and Asia Minor, Valli worked out a theory according to which the etiopathogenetic development of the plague required the so-called “principle of affinity”, that is to say, a sort of predisposition to the disease. “The forces that it deploys in the various subjects depend more on the constitution of each individual than on the character of the miasma”.

In his Discorso sopra il sangue considerato in stato di sanità e di malattia (Discourse on blood in the state of health and of disease), Valli claimed that alterations in haematological parameters were not due to the influence of humoral agents, but of solid agents.

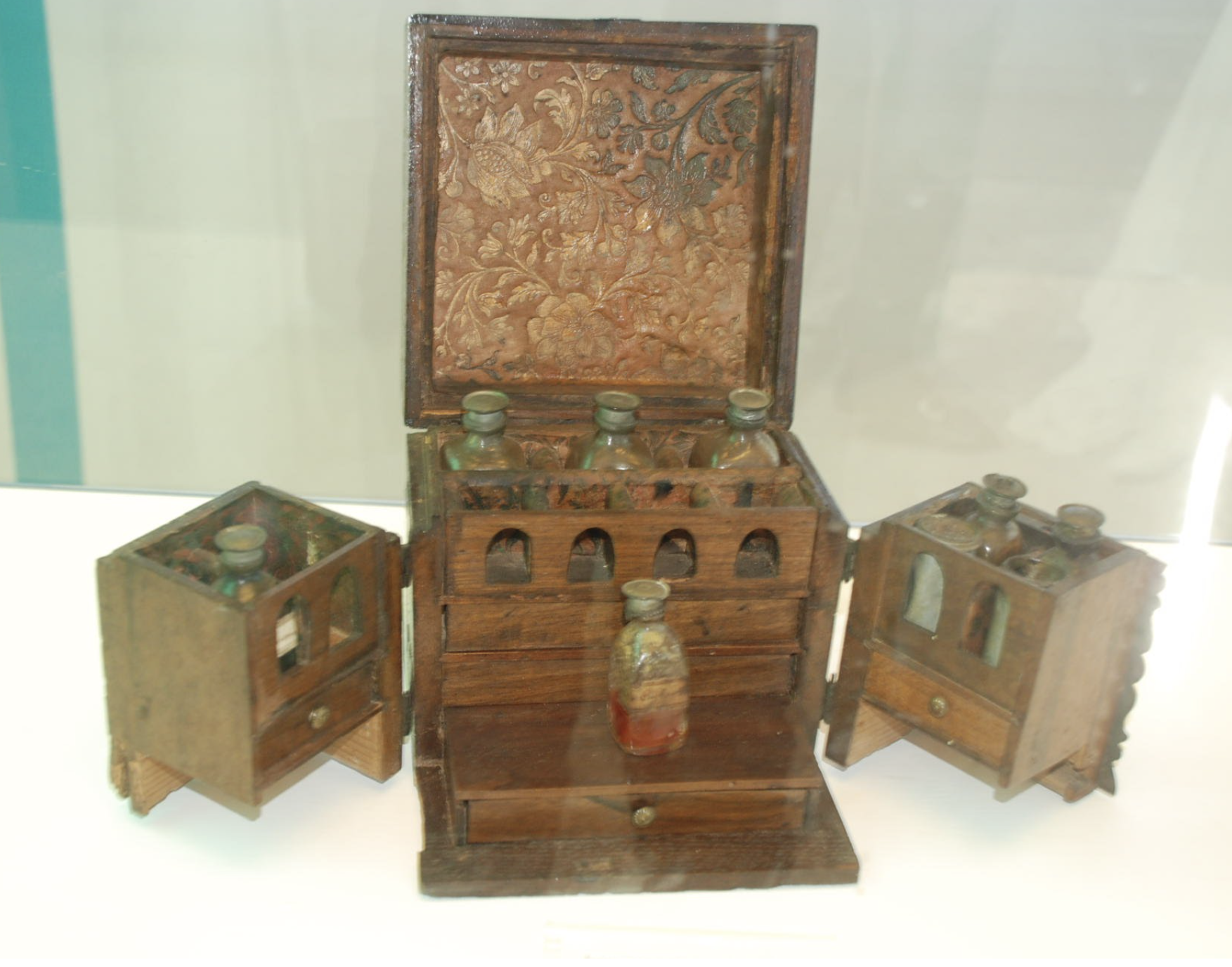
Eusebio Valli's portable pharmaceutical kit, Museo di Storia della Medicina – Polo museale Sapienza

Great attention was paid to "animal electricity". Luigi Galvani, one of Eusebio's leading figures, published some applications of various metals to frogs, and this prompted a large number of other Italian scientists to share and discuss these researches. Eusebio Valli was the first of these to divulge these discoveries, and furthermore, he wrote that his study had "prevented him from sleeping for many nights". Valli became a respected exponent in this field throughout Europe; he gave public lectures on Galvani's experiments and published articles on this topic in various Italian and foreign cities, including Lausanne, Paris, London. In 1793 he published a volume of 300 pages entitled Esperimenti sull'elettricità animale (Experiments on animal electricity), which at the time constituted one of the most organic analyses of all the problems of galvanism.

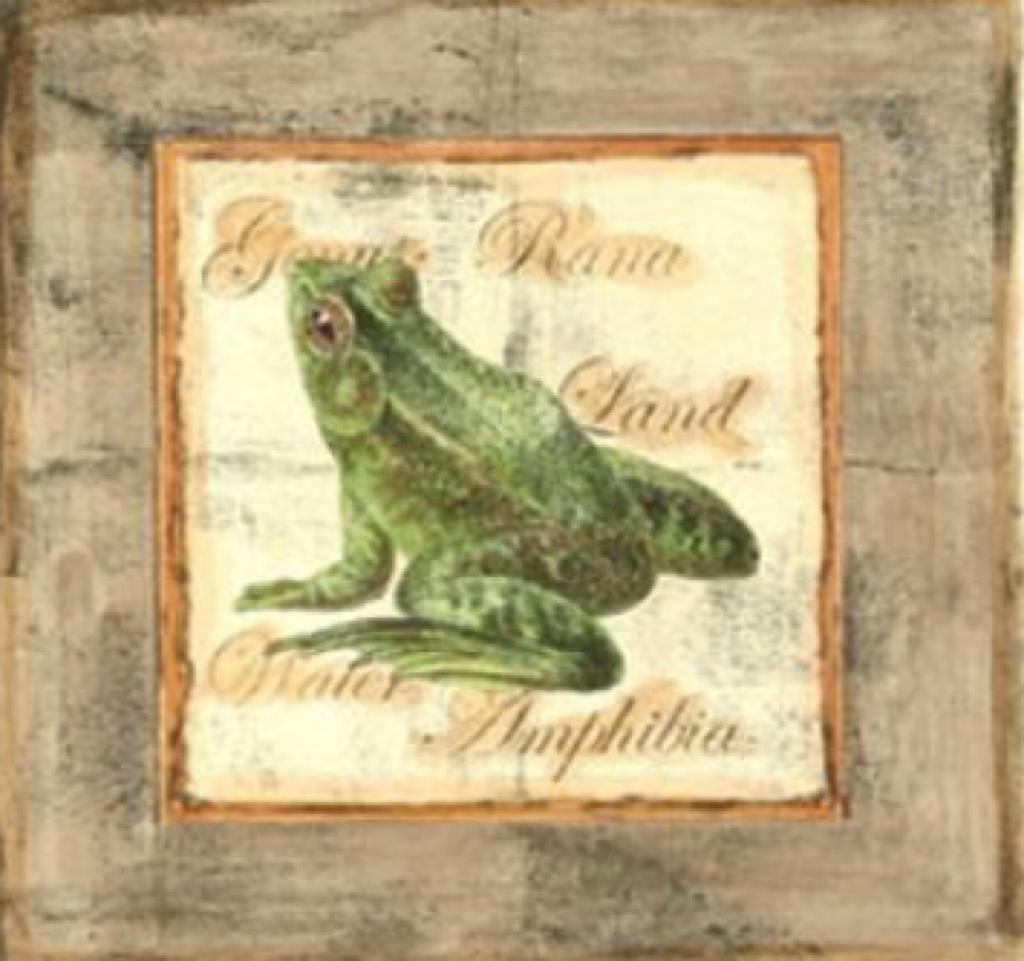
The "intuition frog"

Valli subsequently returned to Turkey to experiment with the inoculation of smallpox vaccine to protect against the plague. Indeed, over the years, he had developed the theory according to which infection by smallpox excluded infection by the plague, and vice versa. Thus, he held, there were two “poisonous pura”, one produced by the plague and the other by smallpox, and contamination between the two would give rise to a “good pus”, which was potentially curative.

On 31 May 1792, Valli became a corresponding member of the Academy of Sciences in Turin. In 1799, in Livorno, Valli partly reproduced experiments conducted by the French abbot, mathematician and physician Robert Rimbaud Deidier (1670–1746). Since 1772, he had succeeded in immunising several animals by inoculating saliva taken from a hydrophobic dog; one of the animals inoculated with the saliva, to which gastric juice from frogs had been added, contracted rabies. With this preparation, He succeeded in treating a certain Pisan lady named Rosermini and her maidservant, achieving a very good result. There, he treated an officer's wife, who had been bitten by a rabid dog; she did not contract rabies.

Accompanied by Dr. Antonio Mendoza, in 1816 he visited San Juan de Dios' Hospital, where he studied the epidemiology of yellow fever.

Most of Valli's discoveries were eclipsed for many years, until Edward Jenner carried out his studies on vaccination. At that point, Casciana Alta's inhabitants put across how their countryman, Eusebio, mostly devoted his life to that field of studies, in this way making his fame grow exponentially.

== Bibliography ==
- Castiglioni, Arturo (1937). Enciclopedia Italiana di Scienze, Lettere ed Arti. Rome (Italy): Treccani.
- Valli, Eusebio (1789). Discorso sopra il sangue considerato in stato di sanità e malattia. Mondovì (Cuneo, Italy): A. Rossi.
- Valli, Eusebio (1792). Saggio sopra diverse malattie croniche. Pavia (Italy): Eredi di P. Galeazzi.
- Valli, Giuseppe (1886). chs. I, II, III, VIII, IX, XI. Cenni biografici sul dottore Eusebio Valli da Ponsacco (Pisa). Estratti dal capitolo XXII dell'antico libro dei ricordi della famiglia di Valle, Valla, della Valle, oggi Valli da Ponsacco, ripristinati dall'avv. Giuseppe Valli nell'anno 1881. 2a edizione, riveduta ed ampliata coll'aggiunta di un... epistolario e di scritti sulla priorità della scoperta dell'inoculazione del virus rabido come rimedio contra la rabbia canina. Pontedera (Pisa, Italy): Massimo Ristori. pp. 9–15, 31–37, 39, 40, 45, 51.
- Volpi, Roberto (Oct 5, 2017). L' uomo che inventò i vaccini. Storia di Eusebio Valli, avventuroso inventore e sperimentatore di vaccini a cavallo tra Sette e Ottocento. Turin (Italy): Lindau. pp. 23, 24, 39, 40. ISBN 88-6708-763-0

== Webliography ==
- NCBI (short for National Center for Biotechnology Information) advances science and health by providing access to biomedical and genomic information.
- JSTOR (short for Journal Storage) is a digital library of academic journals, books, and primary sources.
- Google Arts & Culture is a non-profit initiative that works with cultural institutions and artists around the world.
- SlidePlayer
