= San Ruffino, Casciana Terme Lari =

San Ruffino
- Frazione
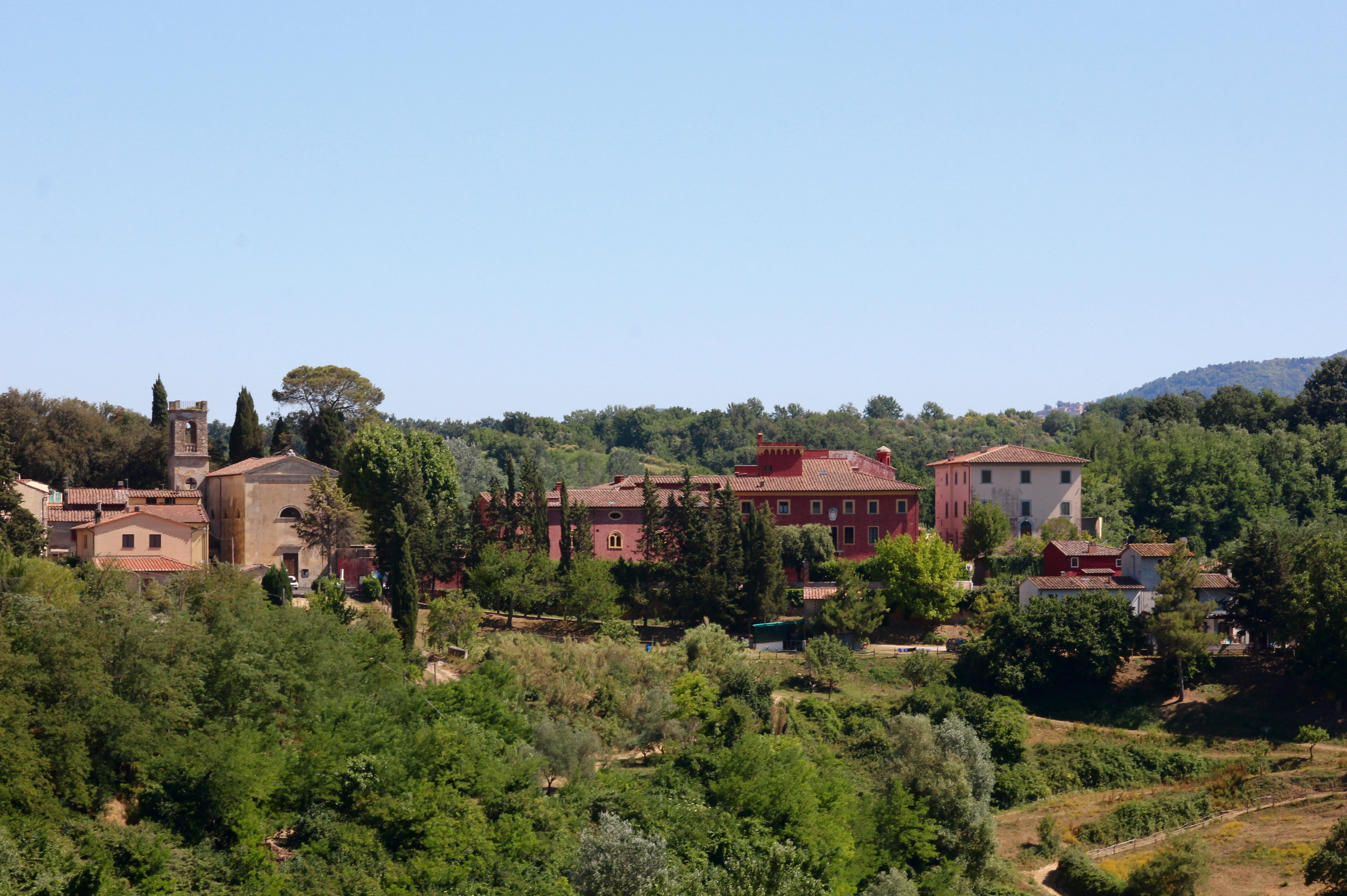

- Location of San Ruffino in Italy
- Coordinates: 43°33′46″N 10°36′44″E
- Country: Italy
- Region: Tuscany
- Province: Pisa (PI)
- Comune: Casciana Terme Lari
- Elevation: 90 m (300 ft)

Population (2001)
  - Total: 72
- Time zone: UTC+1 (CET)
  - Summer (DST): UTC+2 (CEST)
- Postal code: 56035
- Dialing code: (+39) 0587

San Ruffino is a village in Tuscany, central Italy, administratively a frazione of the comune of Casciana Terme Lari, province of Pisa. At the time of the 2001 census its population was 72.

San Ruffino is about 35 km from Pisa and 4 km from Lari.
