= Perignano =

- Frazione
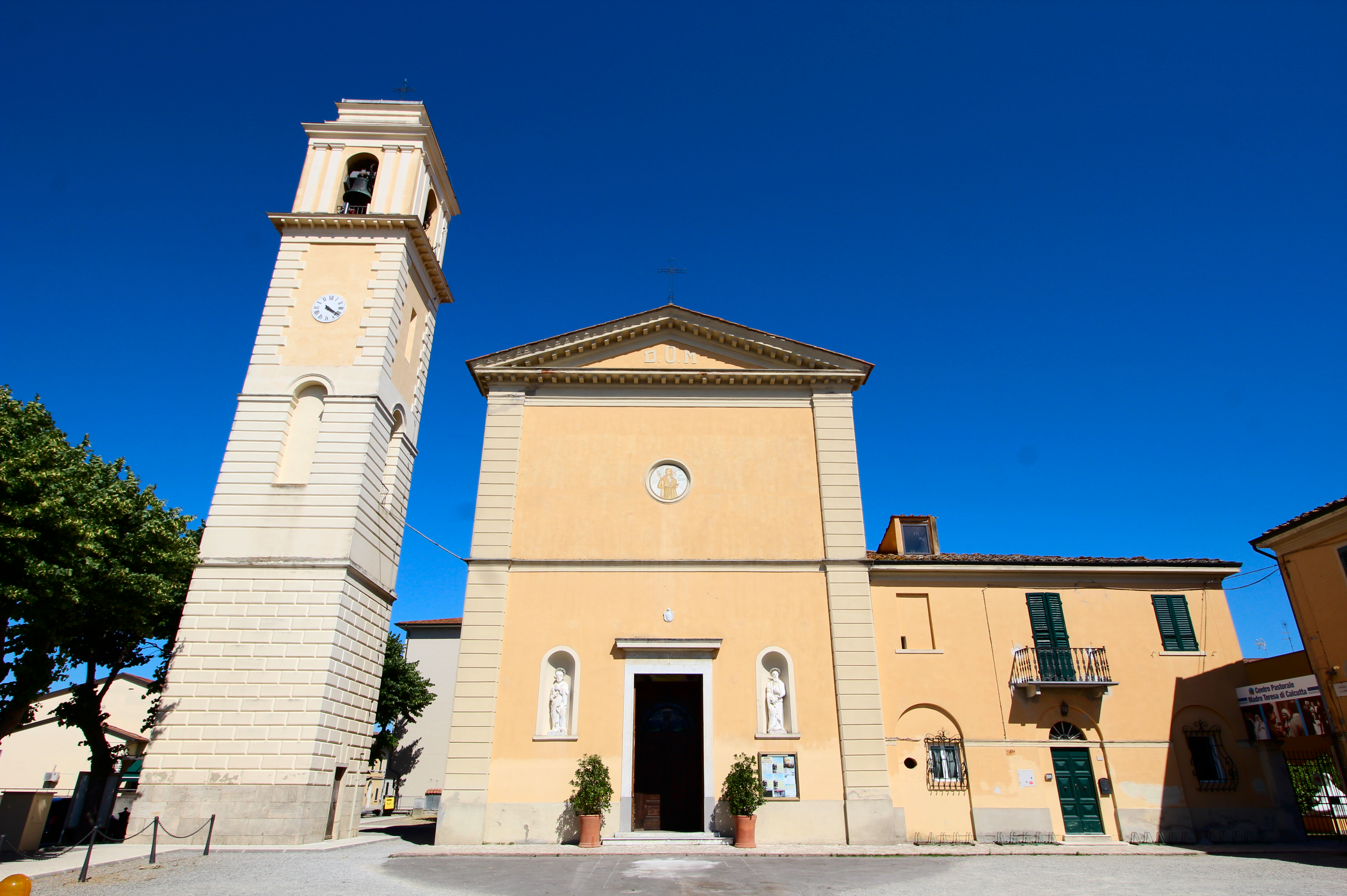
- The church of Santa Lucia in Perignano

- Location of Perignano in Italy
- Coordinates: 43°36′18″N 10°35′22″E
- Country: Italy
- Region: Tuscany
- Province: Pisa (PI)
- Comune: Casciana Terme Lari
- Elevation: 25 m (82 ft)

Population (2011)
  - Total: 3,263
- Time zone: UTC+1 (CET)
  - Summer (DST): UTC+2 (CEST)
- Postal code: 56035
- Dialing code: (+39) 0587

Perignano is a village in Tuscany, central Italy, administratively a frazione of the comune of Casciana Terme Lari, province of Pisa. At the time of the 2001 census its population was 2,404.

Perignano is about 30 km from Pisa and 5 km from Lari.
