= Antonio Niccolini =

Antonio Niccolini may refer to:

- Antonio Niccolini (abbot) (1701–1769), Italian abbot, jurist and scholar
- Antonio Niccolini (architect) (1772–1850), Italian architect and engraver
