= Sant'Ermo =

- Frazione
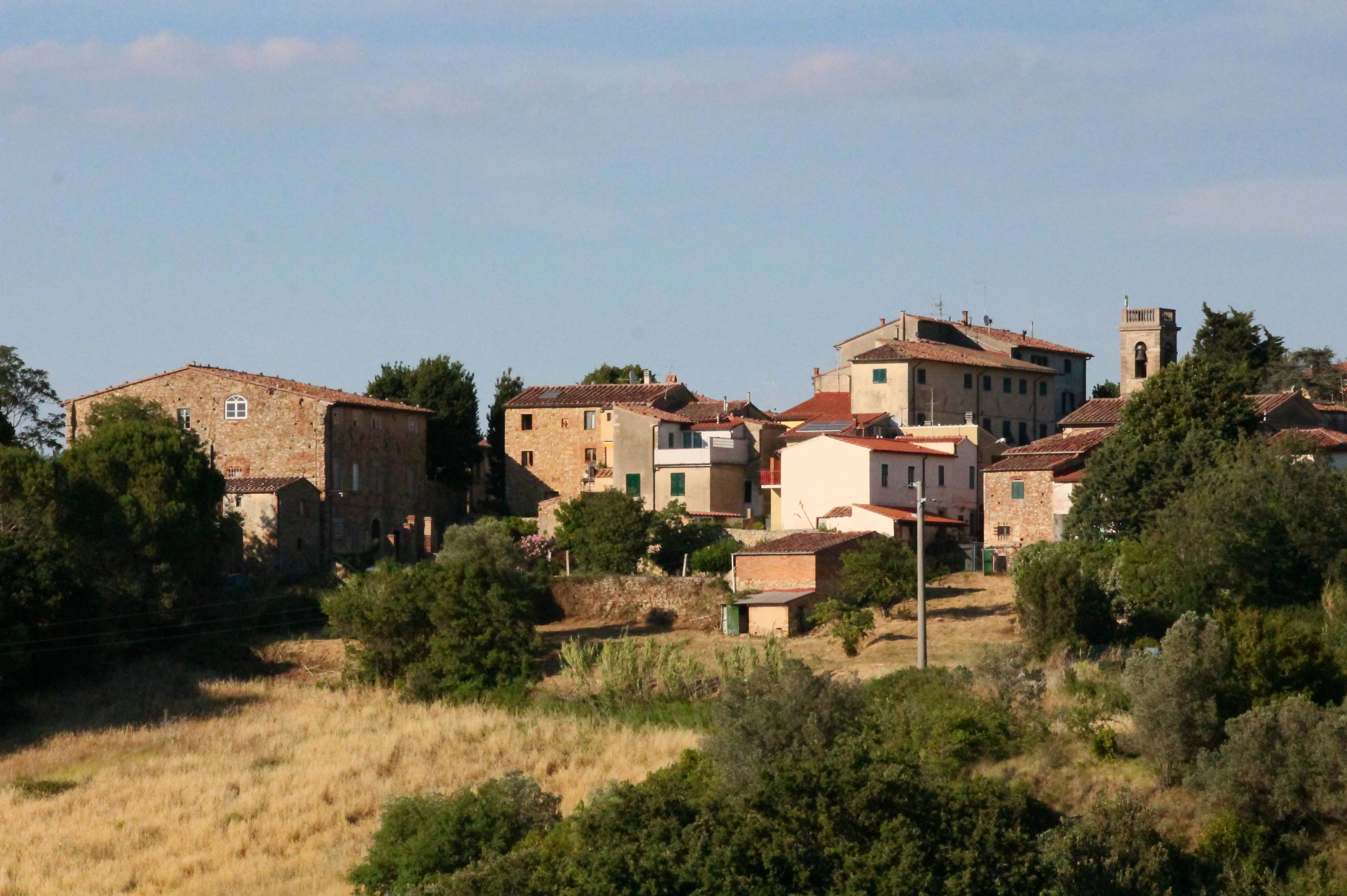

- Location of Sant'Ermo in Italy
- Coordinates: 43°32′12″N 10°34′43″E
- Country: Italy
- Region: Tuscany
- Province: Pisa (PI)
- Comune: Casciana Terme Lari
- Elevation: 180 m (590 ft)

Population (2001)
  - Total: 114
- Time zone: UTC+1 (CET)
  - Summer (DST): UTC+2 (CEST)
- Postal code: 56035
- Dialing code: (+39) 0587

Sant'Ermo is a village in Tuscany, central Italy. It is administratively a frazione of the comune of Casciana Terme Lari, province of Pisa. At the time of the 2001, census its population was 114.

Sant'Ermo is about 40 km from Pisa and 7 km from Lari.
