= Collemontanino =

- Frazione
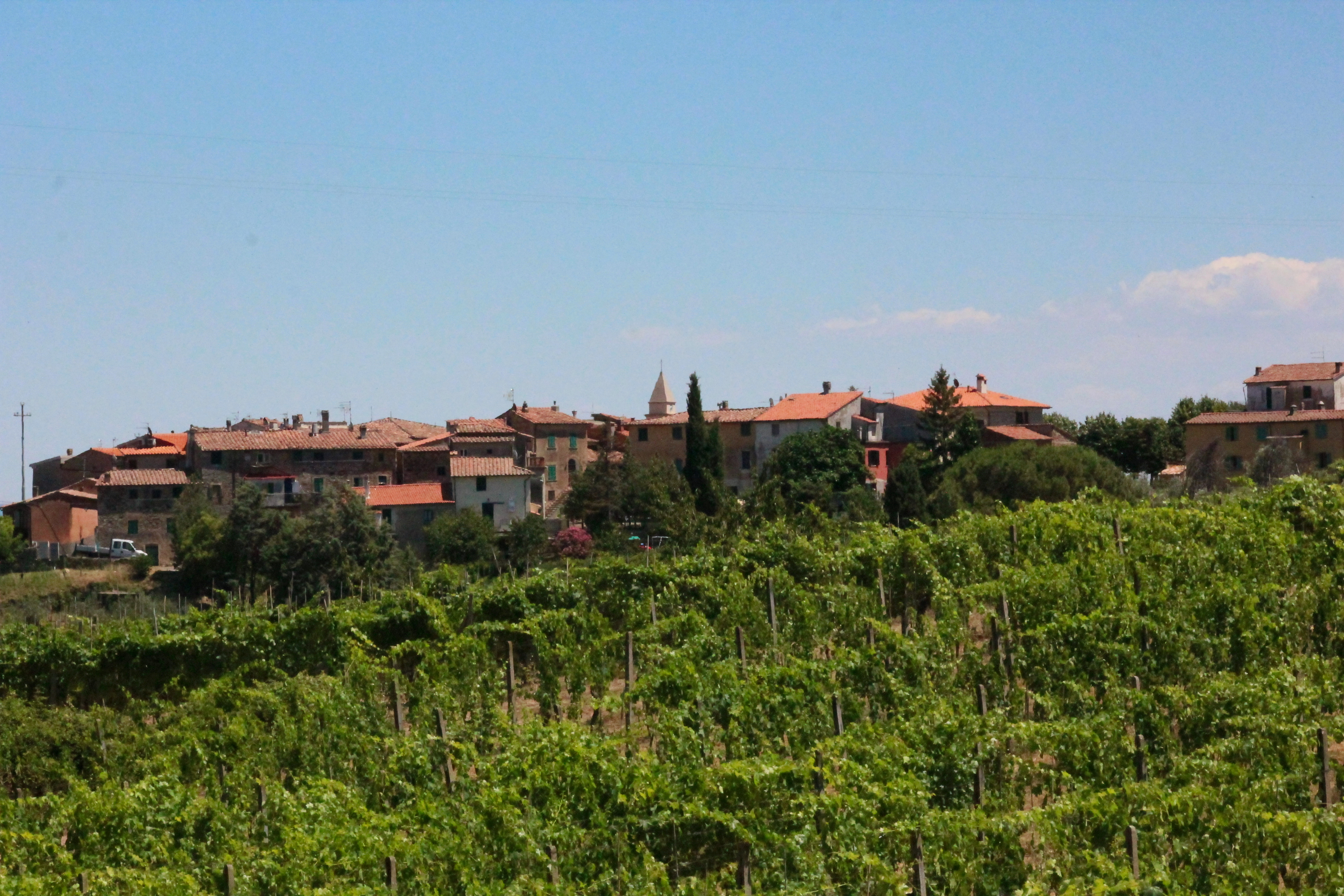

- Location of Collemontanino in Italy
- Coordinates: 43°30′35″N 10°37′3″E
- Country: Italy
- Region: Tuscany
- Province: Pisa (PI)
- Comune: Casciana Terme Lari
- Elevation: 200 m (660 ft)

Population (2011)
  - Total: 311
- Time zone: UTC+1 (CET)
  - Summer (DST): UTC+2 (CEST)
- Postal code: 56035
- Dialing code: (+39) 0587

Collemontanino is a village in Tuscany, central Italy, administratively a frazione of the comune of Casciana Terme Lari, province of Pisa. At the time of the 2001 census its population was 261.

Collemontanino is about 40 km from Pisa and 10 km from Lari.
