= Antonio Niccolini (abbot) =

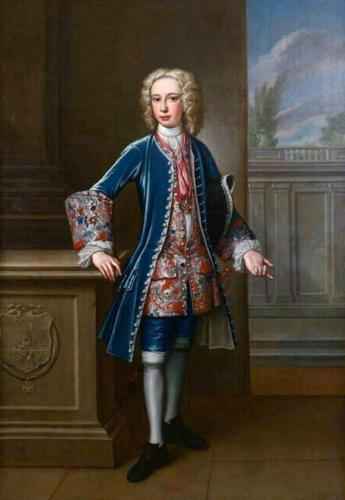
Antonio Niccolini (1701–1769)

Antonio di Filippo di Lorenzo Niccolini (Florence, 1701–1769) was an Italian abbot, jurist and scholar, who was considered one of the leading figures of eighteenth-century Tuscany.

He was born into a noble Florentine family, the youngest child of Filippo, third Marquess of Ponsacco and Camugliano, and was a relative of the Pope. He studied at the University of Pisa and became a member of several Tuscan academies and President of the Botanical Society of Florence.

He was a member of a commission to regulate the carrying of arms which brought him into conflict with the Inquisition who claimed they had the responsibility. After further conflict with representatives of Habsburg-Lorraine, he was exiled from Tuscany in 1748, after which he travelled extensively.

In 1747, then in London, he was elected a Fellow of the Royal Society as "a person of great Merit, universal Learning, and particularly well versed in Philosophical knowledge".

== Biography ==
From a noble Florentine family, the Niccolini, marquises of Ponsacco and Camugliano, he studied law at the University of Pisa where he was a student of Bernardo Tanucci. Protected by the British court, and a nephew of Pope Benedict XIII, he collaborated on the vocabulary of the Accademia della Crusca and was president of the Botanical Society of Florence. He was a member of numerous Tuscan academies.

In 1738, Niccolini was part, along with Senator Giulio Rucellai, fiscal auditor Filippo Luci, and jurist and grand ducal official Pompeo Neri, of the commission created to regulate the legal matter regarding the issuance of the port of arms and limit past abuses. The deputation soon became a cause for conflict with the Florence Inquisition, which until then had had full authority in this matter.

On bad terms with Emmanuel de Nay, Count of Richecourt, one of the House of Habsburg-Lorraine chief advisers, he was sent into exile in 1748.

He was a member of the Royal Society (1747). A Freemasonry, he was a member of the English Florentine lodge of the Earl of Middlesex. He commissioned the construction of the Bandino Grotto in the garden of the Villa del Bandino in Florence.

== Bibliography ==
- Barton, Miles (2013), Period Paintings: Thomas Gibson (1680-1751): Antonio Niccolini (1701-1769), Miles Barton — Includes a portrait of Niccolini as a boy and cites:
- Barton, Miles (2011), "A Man of Sense: Thomas Gibson's Portrait of Antonio Niccolini (1701-1769)", The Georgian Group Journal, XXI: 199–202
- NDP staff (14 May 2007), Niccolini Family, Niccolini Dome Palace
- Romanelli, Rita (Niccolini da Camugliano family archivist) (2013), The Niccolini's history: Between the 18th and the 19th century
