= Cevoli (disambiguation) =

Cevoli is a village in Tuscany, central Italy.

Cevoli may also refer to:

== Surnames ==
- Florida Cevoli (1685–1767), Italian abbess
- Leah Cevoli (born 1974), American film and television actor, host, and producer
- Michele Cevoli (born 1998), Sammarinese footballer
- Richard L. Cevoli (1919–1955), American commander
- Roberto Cevoli (born 1968), Italian football manager and former player
