= Capannoli =

- Comune
- Comune di Capannoli
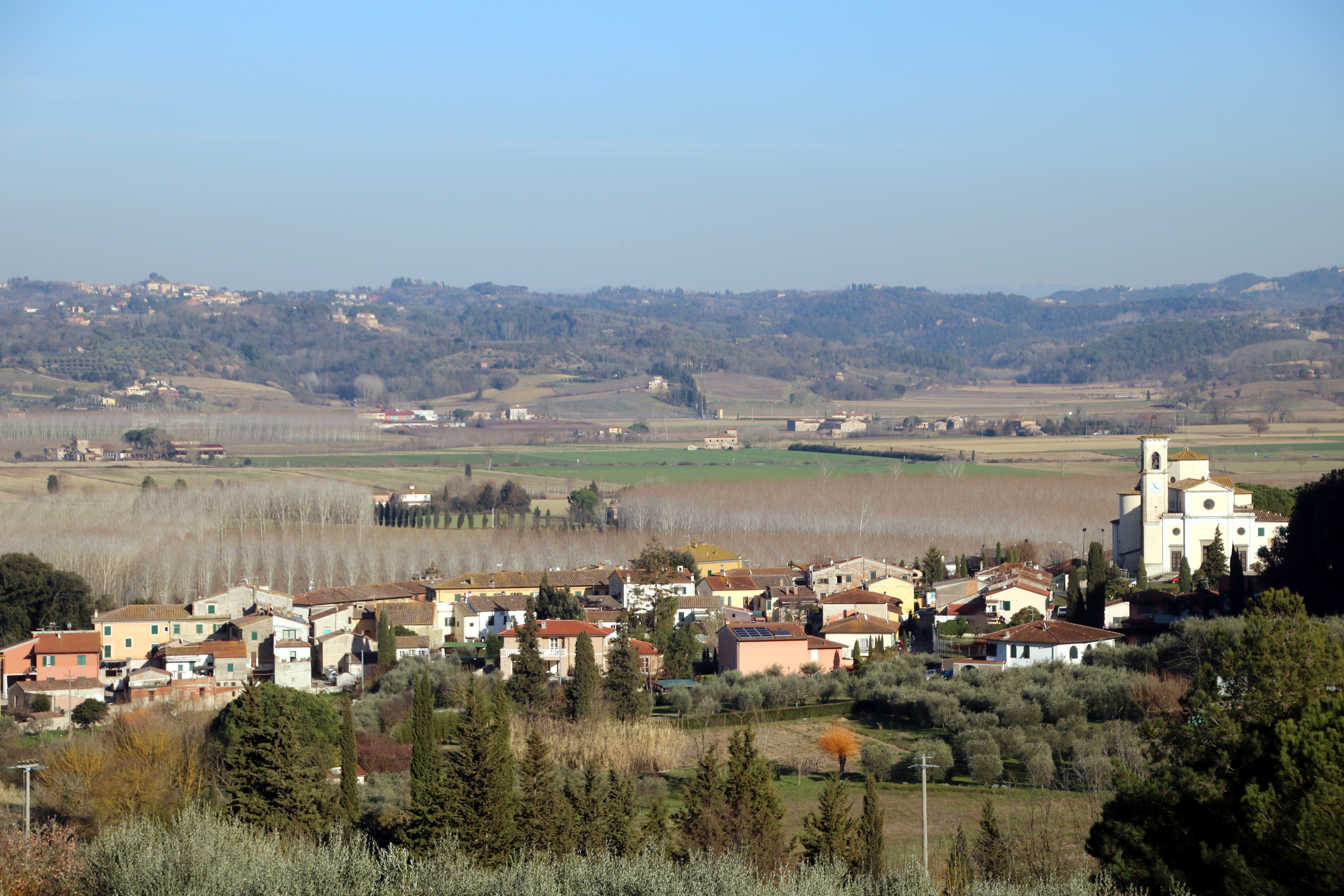
- View of Capannoli

- Location within Italy Location within Tuscany
- Coordinates: 43°35′N 10°40′E
- Country: Italy
- Region: Tuscany
- Province: Pisa (PI)
- Frazioni: Santo Pietro Belvedere

Government
  - Mayor: Arianna Cecchini

Area
  - Total: 22.69 km^{2} (8.76 sq mi)
- Elevation: 51 m (167 ft)

Population (31 May 2017)
  - Total: 6,349
  - Density: 279.8/km^{2} (724.7/sq mi)
- Demonym: Capannolesi
- Time zone: UTC+1 (CET)
  - Summer (DST): UTC+2 (CEST)
- Postal code: 56033
- Dialing code: 0587
- Website: Official website

Capannoli is a comune (municipality) in the Province of Pisa in the Italian region Tuscany, located about 50 kilometres (31 mi) southwest of Florence and about 25 kilometres (16 mi) southeast of Pisa.

Capannoli borders the following municipalities: Casciana Terme Lari, Palaia, Peccioli, Ponsacco, Pontedera, Terricciola. The town of Santo Pietro Belvedere is included in the municipality of Capannoli.
