= Santo Pietro Belvedere =

- Frazione
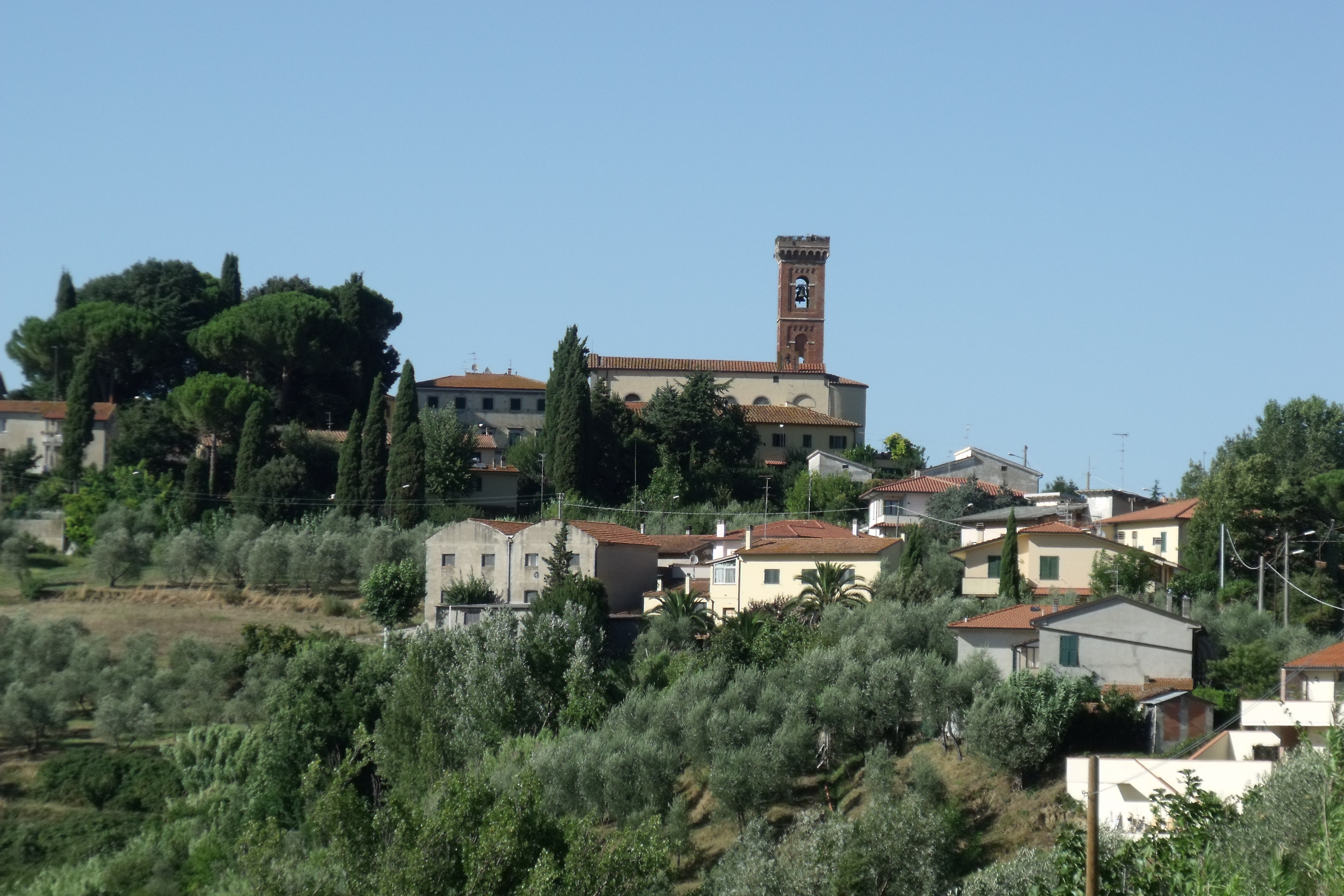

- Location of Santo Pietro Belvedere in Italy
- Coordinates: 43°34′13″N 10°39′59″E
- Country: Italy
- Region: Tuscany
- Province: Pisa (PI)
- Comune: Capannoli
- Elevation: 147 m (482 ft)

Population (2011)
  - Total: 1,504
- Demonym: Santopietrini
- Time zone: UTC+1 (CET)
  - Summer (DST): UTC+2 (CEST)
- Postal code: 56033
- Dialing code: (+39) 0587

Santo Pietro Belvedere is a village in Tuscany, central Italy. It is administratively a frazione of the comune of Capannoli, province of Pisa. At the 2001 census, its population was 1,238.

Santo Pietro Belvedere is about 38 km from Pisa and 2 km from Capannoli.
