= Gianfranco Sanguinetti =

Italian writer (1948–2025)

Gianfranco Sanguinetti (16 July 1948 – 3 October 2025) was a Swiss-born Italian writer who was a member of the Situationist International (SI), a political art movement.

== Life and career ==
Sanguinetti was born in Pully, Switzerland, on 16 July 1948, the son of industrialist Bruno Sanguinetti and Communist politician Teresa Mattei. His parents were secular Jews and active members of the Italian Resistance, who counted the likes of Italo Calvino, Carlo Levi and Louis Aragon among their many acquaintances. Bruno Sanguinetti, a supporter and financier of the Italian Communist Party (PCI), died while his son was still in infancy.

Sanguinetti, having rejected his parents' communism as a schoolboy, first came to public attention when he was arrested in 1965 at the Palazzo Reale in Milan (by Luigi Calabresi, then the city's deputy police commissioner) after unfurling the flag of the Spanish Republic during an official visit by the Francoist government minister Manuel Fraga. He encountered the Situationist International (SI) the following year, and soon afterwards was involved in the protests then engulfing Milan's high schools. At the end of 1968, Sanguinetti arrived in Paris with the intention of meeting Guy Debord, Mustapha Khayati and other leading Situationists. With their help he established the Italian section of the SI, publishing its short-lived magazine and organising the SI's last ever conference in Venice. Having left Milan in the interim, he was deported from France in 1971 and returned to Italy. By 1972, he and Debord were the only two remaining members of the SI. Together they wrote The Veritable Split in the International, a book detailing its rise and fall.

Again working with Debord, in August 1975 Sanguinetti wrote a pamphlet entitled Rapporto veridico sulle ultima opportunita di salvare il capitalismo in Italia (English: The Real Report on the Last Chance to Save Capitalism in Italy), which (inspired by Niccolò Machiavelli and Bruno Bauer) purported to be the cynical writing of "Censor", a powerful industrialist. (Note: Sanguinetti later claimed that he chose the name "Censor" partly in imitation of the banker Guido Carli, who used it as his own pen-name, and also as a nod to Maynard Keynes and his hypothetical supranational currency, the bancor. See Sanguinetti, Gianfranco. "Letter to Mustapha Khayati". 10 December 2012. notbored.org. Retrieved 6 June 2026.) By adopting the voice of a reactionary member of the ruling elite, Sanguinetti aimed to illustrate the support of that elite for the Piazza Fontana bombing and other covert false flag operations as a means of defending the capitalist status quo from the communist threat. The pamphlet was delivered to 520 of Italy's most powerful individuals. It was received as genuine, and numerous politicians, industrialists, and journalists praised its content while attempting to guess who "Censor" really was. After reprinting the tract as a small book, Sanguinetti revealed himself to be the true author. The revelation caused a minor scandal, and under pressure from the authorities Sanguinetti left Italy in February 1976, only to be denied entry to France.

Sanguinetti wrote a later text, On Terrorism and the State, which alleged that Italian secret intelligence had instigated the kidnap and murder of the politician Aldo Moro in 1978. He judged the Red Brigades (Brigate Rosse; BR), the terrorist group held responsible for these crimes, to be little more than "naive fanatics" with neither the revolutionary consciousness nor the operational efficiency required to seize Moro, at least not on their own. Concluding that they must have been manipulated by forces from above, he claimed that "the BR are the state, that is to say one of its many armed appendages." Sanguinetti had earlier rejected the entreaties of Debord to publicly identify the state's role while Moro was still in captivity, causing a permanent rift to develop between the two men.

In the 1980s Sanguinetti developed business interests in the Soviet Union while continuing to maintain his vineyard in the Tuscan countryside, before moving permanently to the Czech Republic at some point during the next decade. Latterly, his main interests were art curation and collecting manuscripts, and he rarely appeared in public. He died in Prague on 3 October 2025, at the age of 77.

== Published works ==
- The Real Report on the Last Chance to Save Capitalism in Italy (1975)
- On Terrorism and the State (1979)
- Remedy to Everything (1980)

== Sources ==
- Éditions Champ Libre, Correspondance, volume 2, éditions Champ Libre, 1981
- Guy Debord, Correspondance, volumes 4 et 5, Fayard
- Christophe Bourseiller, Histoire générale de l'ultra-gauche, Denoël, ISBN 2207251632
