= Le Melorie =

- Frazione
- Location of Le Melorie in Italy
- Coordinates: 43°37′50″N 10°36′35″E
- Country: Italy
- Region: Tuscany
- Province: Pisa (PI)
- Comune: Ponsacco

Population
  - Total: 2,600
- Time zone: UTC+1 (CET)
  - Summer (DST): UTC+2 (CEST)
- Postal code: 56038
- Dialing code: (+39) 0587

Le Melorie is a village in Tuscany, central Italy, administratively a frazione of the comune of Ponsacco, province of Pisa. At the time of the 2006 parish census its population was 2,600.

Le Melorie is about 28 km from Pisa and 1 km from Ponsacco.
