= Cevoli =

- Frazione
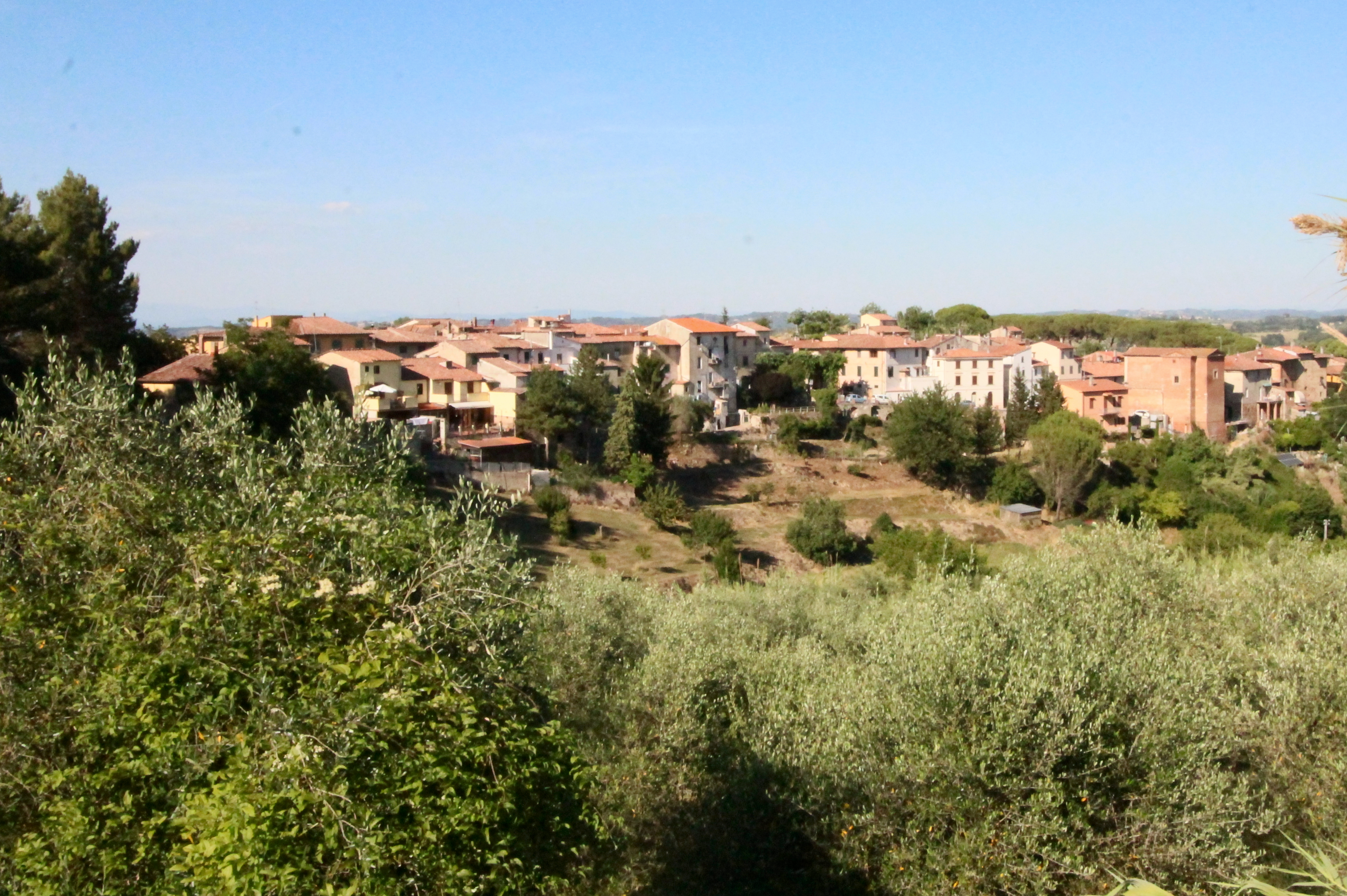

- Location of Cevoli in Italy
- Coordinates: 43°34′23″N 10°36′54″E
- Country: Italy
- Region: Tuscany
- Province: Pisa (PI)
- Comune: Casciana Terme Lari
- Elevation: 85 m (279 ft)

Population (2011)
  - Total: 274
- Demonym: Cevolesi
- Time zone: UTC+1 (CET)
  - Summer (DST): UTC+2 (CEST)
- Postal code: 56035
- Dialing code: (+39) 0587

Cevoli is a village in Tuscany, central Italy, administratively a frazione of the comune of Casciana Terme Lari, province of Pisa. At the time of the 2001 census its population was 289.

Cevoli is about 33 km from Pisa and 4 km from Lari.
