= Lavaiano =

- Frazione
- Location of Lavaiano in Italy
- Coordinates: 43°37′44″N 10°35′5″E
- Country: Italy
- Region: Tuscany
- Province: Pisa (PI)
- Comune: Casciana Terme Lari
- Elevation: 14 m (46 ft)

Population (2011)
  - Total: 590
- Time zone: UTC+1 (CET)
  - Summer (DST): UTC+2 (CEST)
- Postal code: 56035
- Dialing code: (+39) 0587

Lavaiano is a village in Tuscany, central Italy, administratively a frazione of the comune of Casciana Terme Lari, province of Pisa. At the time of the 2001 census its population was 359.

Lavaiano is about 26 km from Pisa and 10 km from Lari.
