= Val di Cava =

- Frazione
- Location of Val di Cava in Italy
- Coordinates: 43°38′17″N 10°38′56″E
- Country: Italy
- Region: Tuscany
- Province: Pisa (PI)
- Comune: Ponsacco
- Elevation: 23 m (75 ft)

Population (2011)
  - Total: 1,146
- Time zone: UTC+1 (CET)
  - Summer (DST): UTC+2 (CEST)
- Postal code: 56038
- Dialing code: (+39) 0587

Val di Cava (formerly Giardino) is a village in Tuscany, central Italy, administratively a frazione of the comune of Ponsacco, province of Pisa. At the time of the 2001 census its population was 675.

Val di Cava is about 30 km from Pisa and 4 km from Ponsacco.
