= Daniele Balli =

Italian footballer (born 1967)

Personal information
- Date of birth: 16 September 1967 (age 59)
- Place of birth: Florence, Italy
- Height: 1.80 m (5 ft 11 in)
- Position: Goalkeeper

Youth career
- 1976–1980: Audace Galluzzo
- 1980–1988: Empoli

Senior career*
Years	Team	Apps	(Gls)
1988–1989	Empoli	90	(0)
1989–1990	→ Trento (loan)	5	(0)
1990–1991	→ Mobilieri Ponsacco (loan)	30	(0)
1991–1997	→ Tempio (loan)	11	(0)
1997–1999	Salernitana	64	(0)
1999–2001	Ternana	63	(0)
2001–2002	Pistoiese	37	(0)
2003	Nocerina	14	(0)
2003–2008	Empoli	117	(0)
2008–2009	Pisa	0	(0)
2009–2010	Cerretese		
2010–2011	Fucecchio		
Total		432	(0)
- * Club domestic league appearances and goals

Daniele Balli (born 16 September 1967) is a former Italian footballer who played as a goalkeeper.

== Career ==
Grown up in the Empoli youth system, Balli spent his early professional years with several Serie C1 and Serie C2 teams (Trento, Mobilieri Ponsacco, Tempio) before to return to Empoli as a reserve keeper in 1992. In 1994, he finally managed to become the first choice for the Tuscan team, being instrumental in two consecutive promotions from Serie C1 to Serie A. In 1997, he joined Salernitana, obtaining a personal third consecutive promotion with the Campanian side, and playing with them also in the following season, the first in the Italian top flight for Balli.

In 1999, following Salernitana's relegation back to Serie B, he joined ambitious Umbrian Serie B club Ternana, playing more than sixty games in two seasons for the rossoverdi. In 2001, he returned to Tuscany, joining Pistoiese, who then were relegated to Serie C1 that season.

Now without a team, 35-year-old Balli returned into active football only in January 2003, joining Serie C2 club Nocerina. In September 2003 he then made a comeback to Empoli, in search for an experienced goalkeeper, thus returning to play into Serie A as second choice behind former Italian international Luca Bucci. In the following 2004–05 season, now in Serie B, Balli then returned to play football regularly and helped his side to win a prompt return to the Italian Serie A. In 2005–06 he played less regularly, also because of the presence of other keepers such as Gianluca Berti and Sebastián Cejas. The following two seasons saw Balli being sided by youngster Davide Bassi for the first choice goalie role. He was released in June 2008, after Empoli went relegated to Serie B.

On 13 February 2009 41-year-old Balli accepted to join Serie B club Pisa until the end of the 2008–09 season, going on the bench for the 14 February local derby against Livorno. However, on 21 February, eight days after his signing, Pisa announced to have parted company with Balli under player's request, citing the veteran goalie's doubts regarding his fitness conditions as being the main reason for this choice.

== Career statistics ==
Appearances and goals by club, season and competition
Club	Season	League			National cup		Europe		Other		Total	
Club	Season	Division	Apps	Goals	Apps	Goals	Apps	Goals	Apps	Goals	Apps	Goals
Empoli	1987–88	Serie A	0	0	—		—		—		0	0
Empoli	1991–92	Serie C1	0	0	0	0	—		—		0	0
Empoli	1992–93	Serie C1	2	0	0	0	—		—		2	0
Empoli	1993–94	Serie C1	1	0	1	0	—		0	0	2	0
Empoli	1994–95	Serie C1	16	0	—		—		—		16	0
Empoli	1995–96	Serie C1	34	0	—		—		3	0	37	0
Empoli	1996–97	Serie B	38	0	3	0	—		—		31	0
Empoli	Total		91	0	4	0	—		3	0	98	0
Trento (loan)	1988–89	Serie C1	5	0	—		—		—		5	0
Mobilieri Ponsacco (loan)	1989–90	Serie C2	30	0	2	0	—		—		30	0
Tempio (loan)	1990–91	Serie C2	11	0	—		—		—		11	0
Salernitana	1997–98	Serie B	33	0	2	0	—		—		35	0
Salernitana	1998–99	Serie B	31	0	2	0	—		—		33	0
Salernitana	Total		64	0	4	0	—		—		68	0
Ternana	1999–2000	Serie B	37	0	4	0	—		—		41	0
Ternana	2000–01	Serie B	26	0	2	0	—		—		28	0
Ternana	Total		63	0	6	0	—		—		69	0
Pistoiese	2001–02	Serie B	37	0	2	0	—		—		39	0
Nocerina	2002–03	Serie C2	14	0	—		—		2	0	16	0
Empoli	2003–04	Serie A	14	0	0	0	—		—		14	0
Empoli	2004–05	Serie B	39	0	1	0	—		—		40	0
Empoli	2005–06	Serie A	13	0	1	0	—		—		14	0
Empoli	2006–07	Serie A	30	0	2	0	—		—		41	0
Empoli	2007–08	Serie A	21	0	1	0	0	0	—		22	0
Empoli	Total		117	0	5	0	0	0	—		122	0
Pisa	2008–09	Serie B	0	0	—		—		—		0	0
Career total			432	0	23	0	0	0	5	0	460	0
