= Ceppato =

- Frazione
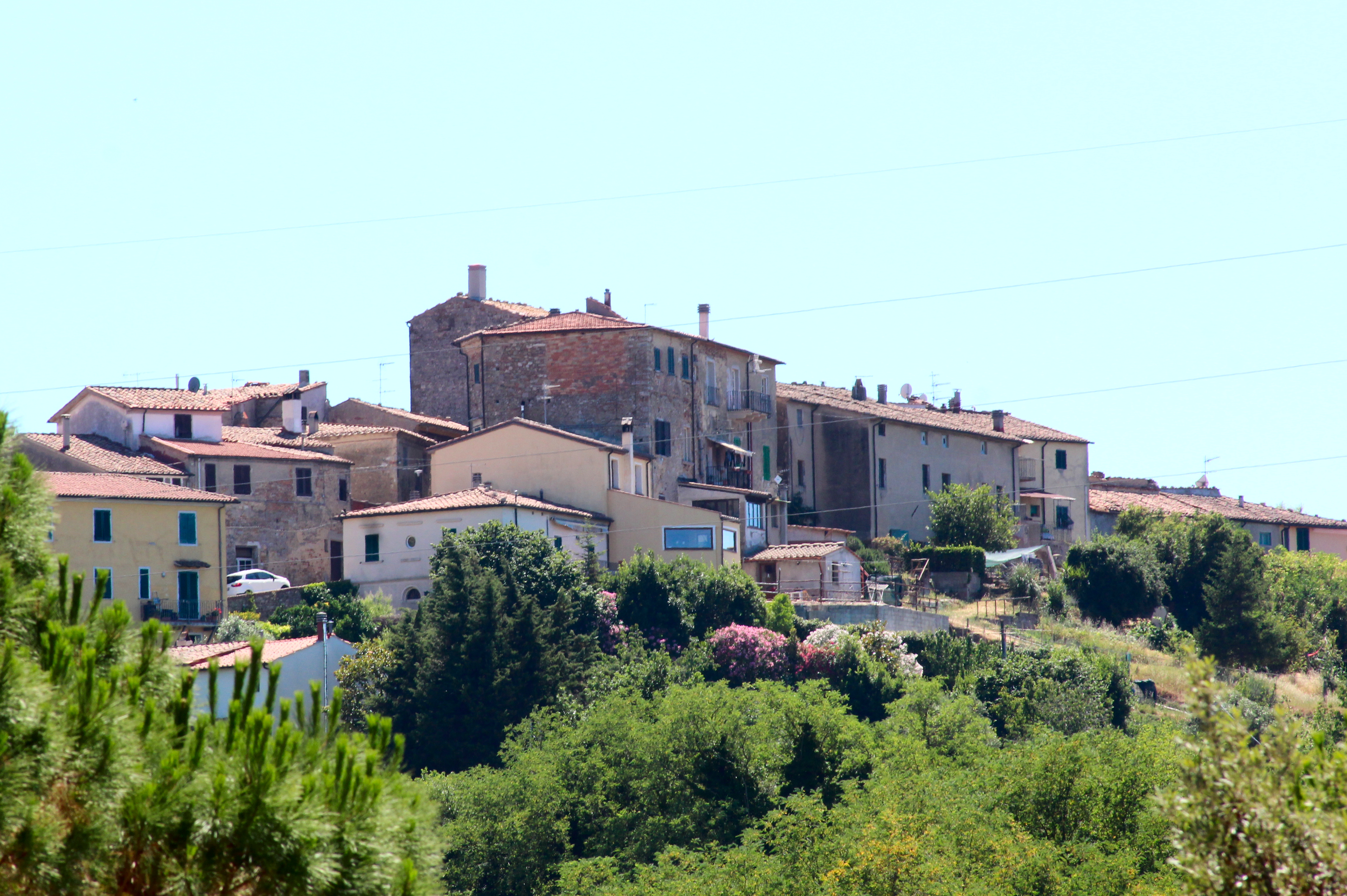

- Location of Ceppato in Italy
- Coordinates: 43°31′54″N 10°35′41″E
- Country: Italy
- Region: Tuscany
- Province: Pisa (PI)
- Comune: Casciana Terme Lari
- Elevation: 230 m (750 ft)

Population (2011)
  - Total: 104
- Time zone: UTC+1 (CET)
  - Summer (DST): UTC+2 (CEST)
- Postal code: 56035
- Dialing code: (+39) 0587

Ceppato is a village in Tuscany, central Italy, administratively a frazione of the comune of Casciana Terme Lari, province of Pisa. At the time of the 2001 census its population was 140.

Ceppato is about 40 km from Pisa and 8 km from Lari.
