= Camugliano =

- Frazione
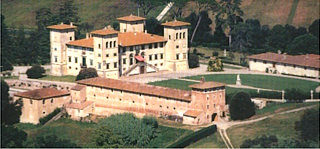
- View of Camugliano

- Location of Camugliano in Italy
- Coordinates: 43°36′5″N 10°39′21″E
- Country: Italy
- Region: Tuscany
- Province: Pisa (PI)
- Comune: Ponsacco

Population
  - Total: 40
- Demonym: Camuglianesi
- Time zone: UTC+1 (CET)
  - Summer (DST): UTC+2 (CEST)
- Postal code: 56038
- Dialing code: (+39) 0587

Camugliano is a village in Tuscany, central Italy, administratively a frazione of the comune of Ponsacco, province of Pisa. At the time of the 2006 parish census its population was 40.

Camugliano is about 32 km from Pisa and 2 km from Ponsacco.
