= Casciana Alta =

- Frazione
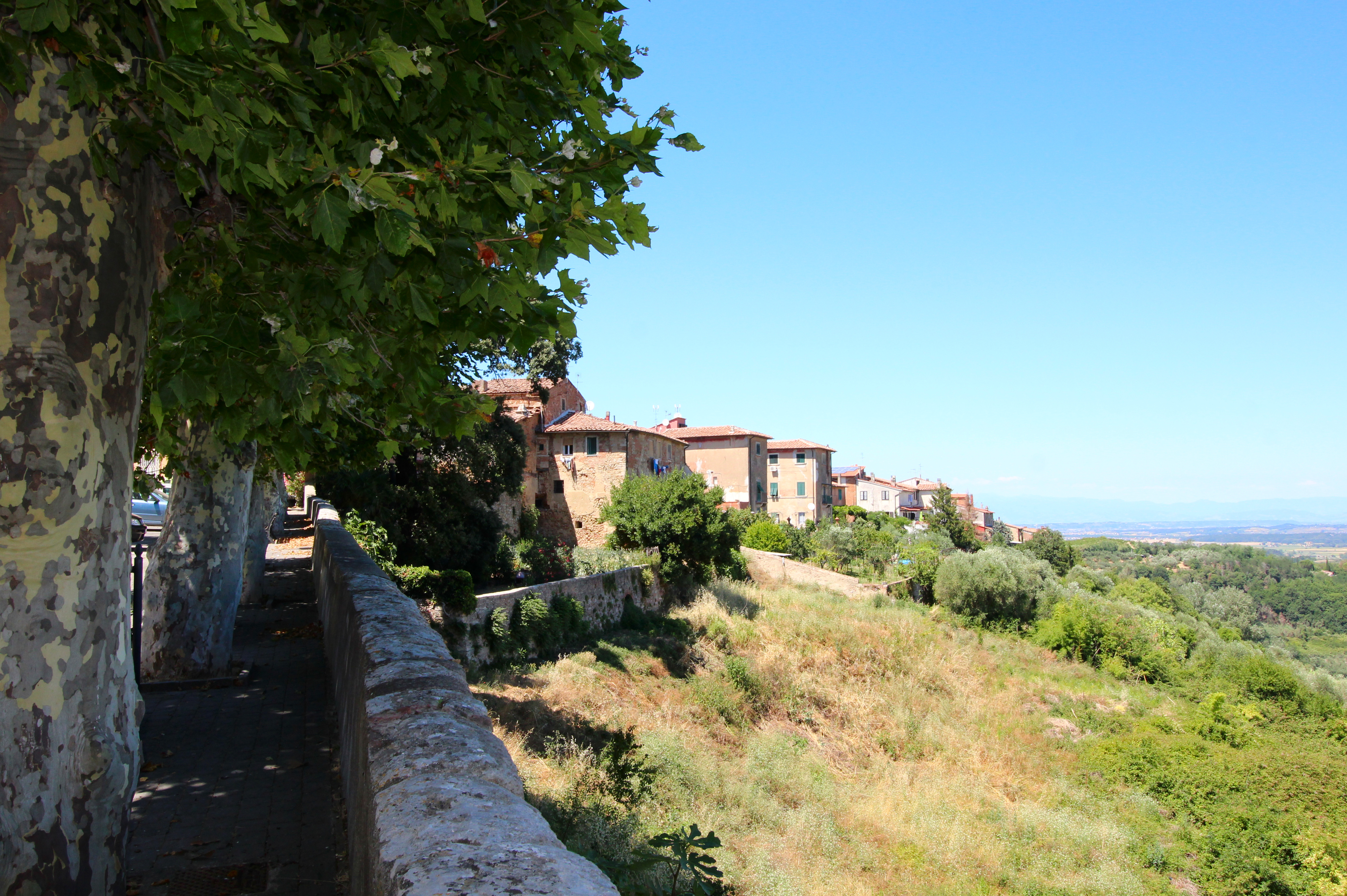

- Location of Casciana Alta in Italy
- Coordinates: 43°32′20″N 10°35′55″E
- Country: Italy
- Region: Tuscany
- Province: Pisa (PI)
- Comune: Casciana Terme Lari
- Elevation: 200 m (660 ft)

Population (2011)
  - Total: 498
- Time zone: UTC+1 (CET)
  - Summer (DST): UTC+2 (CEST)
- Postal code: 56035
- Dialing code: (+39) 0587

Casciana Alta is a village in Tuscany, central Italy, administratively a frazione of the comune of Casciana Terme Lari, province of Pisa. At the time of the 2001 census its population was 459.

Casciana Alta is about 37 km from Pisa and 5 km from Lari.
