= Casciana Terme Lari =

- Comune
- Comune di Casciana Terme Lari
- Location within Italy Location within Tuscany
- Coordinates: 43°34′08″N 10°35′37″E
- Country: Italy
- Region: Tuscany
- Province: Pisa (PI)
- Frazioni: Casciana Alta, Casciana Terme, Ceppato, Cevoli, Collemontanino, Lari, Lavaiano, Parlascio, Perignano, Sant'Ermo, San Ruffino, Usigliano

Government
  - Mayor: Mirko Terreni

Area
  - Total: 81.4 km^{2} (31.4 sq mi)
- Elevation: 127 m (417 ft)

Population (31 August 2017)
  - Total: 12,436
  - Density: 153/km^{2} (396/sq mi)
- Demonym(s): Cascianesi and Larigiani
- Time zone: UTC+1 (CET)
  - Summer (DST): UTC+2 (CEST)
- Postal code: 56034; 56035
- Dialing code: 0587
- Website: Official website

Casciana Terme Lari is a comune (municipality) in the Province of Pisa in the Italian region Tuscany, located about 60 kilometres (37 mi) southwest of Florence and about 30 kilometres (19 mi) southeast of Pisa.

== Geography ==
Casciana Terme Lari borders the following municipalities: Capannoli, Cascina, Chianni, Crespina Lorenzana, Santa Luce, Ponsacco, Pontedera, Terricciola.

=== Subdivisions ===
The municipality is composed by twelve frazioni (towns and villages):

- Casciana Alta
- Casciana Terme
- Ceppato
- Cevoli
- Collemontanino
- Lari (municipal seat)
- Lavaiano
- Parlascio
- Perignano
- Sant'Ermo
- San Ruffino
- Usigliano

== History ==
The municipality of Casciana Terme Lari was created on 1 January 2014 by merging the former municipalities of Casciana Terme and Lari. The municipal seat is in Lari.
