= Ponsacco =

- Comune
- Comune di Ponsacco
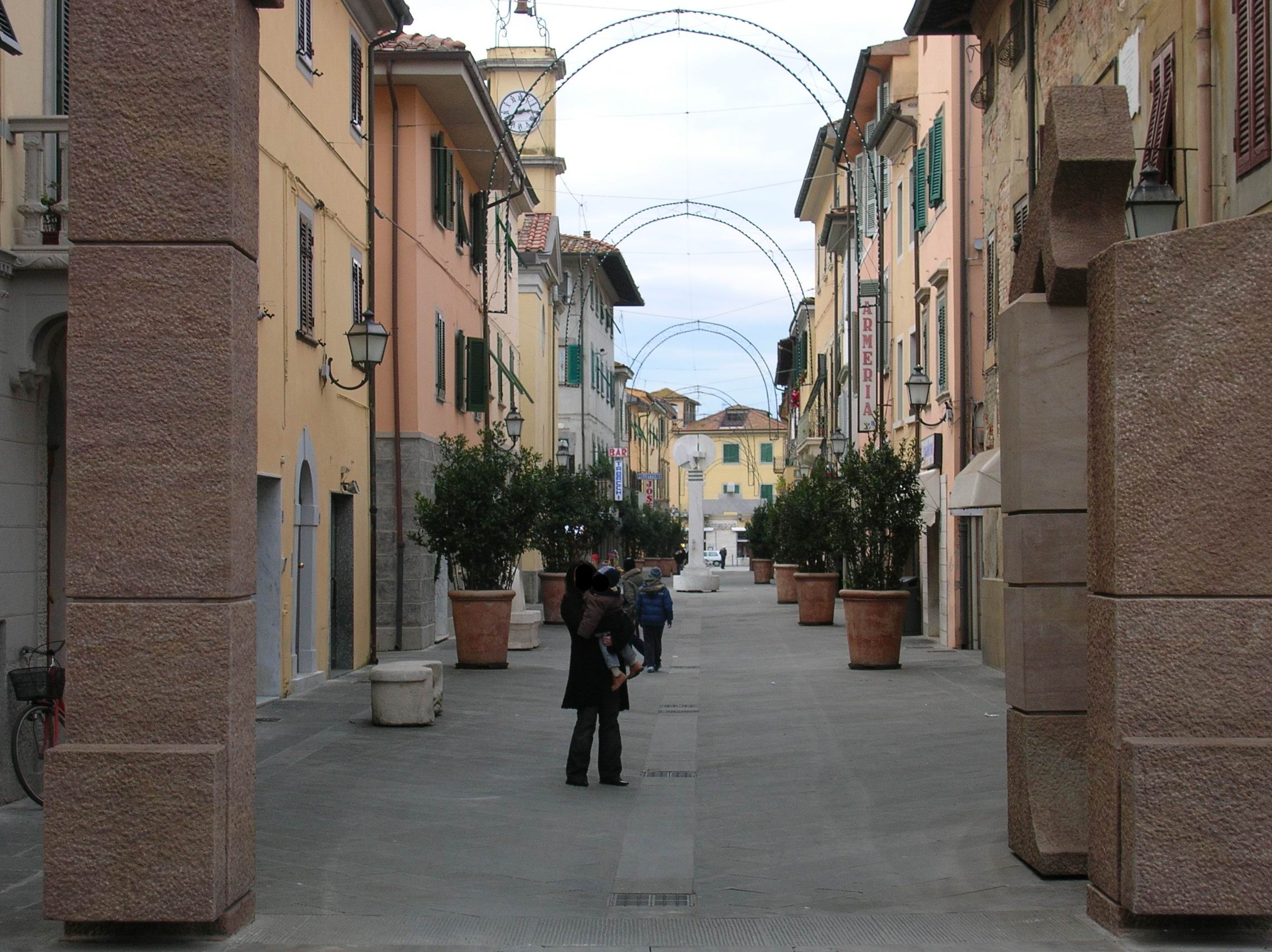
- Center of Ponsacco

- Location within Italy Location within Tuscany
- Coordinates: 43°37′N 10°38′E
- Country: Italy
- Region: Tuscany
- Province: Pisa (PI)
- Frazioni: Camugliano, Le Melorie, Val di Cava

Government
  - Mayor: Francesca Brogi

Area
  - Total: 20.90 km^{2} (8.07 sq mi)
- Elevation: 24 m (79 ft)

Population (31 December 2017)
  - Total: 15,539
  - Density: 743.5/km^{2} (1,926/sq mi)
- Demonym: Ponsacchini
- Time zone: UTC+1 (CET)
  - Summer (DST): UTC+2 (CEST)
- Postal code: 56038
- Dialing code: 0587
- Website: Official website

Ponsacco is a comune (municipality) in the Province of Pisa in the Italian region Tuscany, located about 50 kilometres (31 mi) southwest of Florence and about 20 kilometres (12 mi) southeast of Pisa.

== Geography ==
The municipality of Ponsacco contains the frazioni (subdivisions, mainly villages and hamlets) Camugliano, Le Melorie and Val di Cava.

Ponsacco borders the following municipalities: Capannoli, Casciana Terme Lari, Pontedera.

== Twin towns ==
- Brignais, France
- Nanoro, Burkina Faso
- Treuchtlingen, Germany
- Agounit, Western Sahara
