= Lari, Tuscany =

Lari
- Frazione
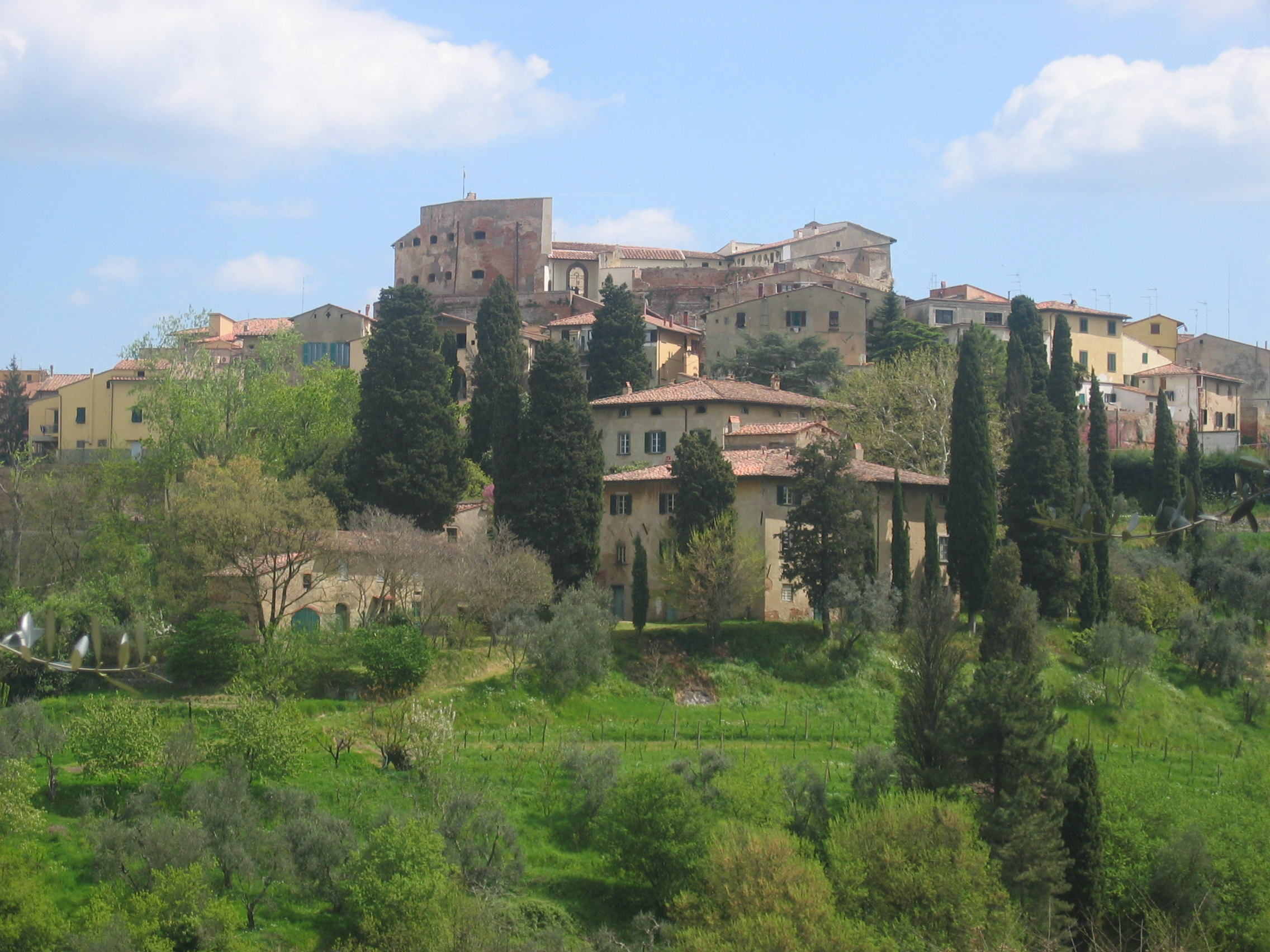

- Location of Lari in Italy
- Coordinates: 43°34′N 10°36′E
- Country: Italy
- Region: Tuscany
- Province: Pisa (PI)
- Comune: Casciana Terme Lari

Area
  - Total: 45.1 km^{2} (17.4 sq mi)
- Elevation: 130 m (430 ft)

Population (31 December 2001)
  - Total: 1,110
  - Density: 24.6/km^{2} (63.7/sq mi)
- Demonym: Larigiani
- Time zone: UTC+1 (CET)
  - Summer (DST): UTC+2 (CEST)
- Postal code: 56035
- Dialing code: 0587
- Website: www.comune.lari.pi.it

Lari is a walled mountaintop frazione, or hamlet, in the comune of Casciana Terme Lari, 60 kilometres (37 mi) southwest of Florence and 25 kilometres (16 mi) southeast of Pisa, in the Tuscany region of Italy. The municipal seat of its comune, Lari dates from at least the 9th century BC, a fact established by its traces of Etruscan architecture. It sits at a high elevation for Tuscany and centers around a castle, with distant views in all directions. Physician Eusebio Valli was born in the hamlet.
