= List of parishes of the Roman Catholic Archdiocese of Lucca =

List of parishes by province and commune for the Roman Catholic Archdiocese of Lucca.

== Tuscany ==
=== Province of Lucca ===
Altopascio
S. Pietro (Badia Pozzeveri)
Bagni di Lucca
S. Pietro
SS. Crocifisso (Bagni di Lucca Ponte)
S. Maria Assunta (Benabbio)
S. Maria Assunta (Brandeglio)
Santi Quirico e Giulitta (Casabasciana)
Santi Donato e Andrea (Casoli)
S. Bartolomeo (Cocciglia)
Santi Iacopo e Frediano (Crasciana)
Santi Pietro e Paolo (Fornoli)
S. Michele (Granaiola)
S. Martino (Limano)
S. Pietro (Lucchio)
S. Iacopo (Lugliano)
S. Frediano (Montefegatesi)
Santi Maria e Donato (Monti di Villa)
S. Maria Assunta (Palleggio)
S. Giovanni Battista (Pieve di Controne)
S. Giovanni Battista (Pieve di Monti di Villa)
S. Cassiano (San Cassiano di Controni)
S. Gemignano (San Gemignano)
S. Paolo (Vico Pancellorum)
Borgo a Mozzano
S. Giovanni Battista(Cerreto)
S. Iacopo (capoluogo)
S. Rocco (capoluogo)
S. Pietro (Anchiano)
S. Frediano (Chifenti)
S. Michele (Corsagna)
S. Bartolomeo (Cune)
S. Elisabetta (Dezza)
S. Maria Assunta (Diecimo)
Santi Lorenzo e Donato (Domazzano)
S. Maria Assunta (Gioviano)
S. Giusto (Motrone)
S. Ilario (Oneta)
Santi Giusto e Clemente (Partigliano)
S. Maria del Soccorso (Piano della Rocca)
S. Prospero (Tempagnano)
S. Pietro (Valdottavo)
Camaiore
Immacolata Concezione e S.Lazzaro
S. Biagio
S. Maria Assunta
Spirito Santo
Nostra Signora del Sacro Cuore (Capezzano Pianore)
S. Pietro (Fibbialla)
S. Francesco d’Assisi (Fibbiano)
S. Michele (Gombitelli)
Natività di Maria SS. e S.Giuseppe (Greppolungo)
S. Rocco (Lido di Camaiore)
Sacro Cuore di Gesù Lido di Camaiore
Maria SS. Ausiliatrice (Marignana)
S. Maria Assunta (Metato)
S. Martino (Migliano)
S. Margherita (Montebello)
S. Stefano (Monteggiori)
S. Michele (Montemagno)
S. Pietro (Nocchi)
S. Giorgio (Orbicciano)
S. Iacopo (Pedona)
S. Giovanni Battista e Stefano (Pieve-Camaiore)
S. Andrea (Pontemazzori)
S. Lucia (Santa Lucia)
S. Maria Assunta (Santa Maria Albiano)
Cristo Re (Secco)
S. Michele (Torcigliano di Camaiore)
Santi Vincenzo Ferreri e Ansano (Vado)
S. Martino (Valpromaro)
Camporgiano
S. Giacomo Apostolo
S. Maria Assunta (Poggio)
S. Tommaso Apostolo (Casciana)
Santi Pellegrino e Felicita (Cascianella)
S. Rocco (Filicaia)
S. Maria Assunta (Puglianella)
S. Stefano Martire (Roccalberti)
S. Nicolao (Sillicano)
S. Maria Assunta (Vitoio)
Capannori
Santi Quirico e Giulietta
S. Bartolomeo (Badia Cantignano)
S. Michele (Camigliano Santa Gemma)
S. Pietro Camigliano Santa Gemma
Santi Donato e Biagio (Carraia)
S. Andrea (Castelvecchio di Compito)
S. Maria Assunta (Colle di Compito)
S. Michele (Colognora di Compito)
S. Lucia (Coselli)
S. Maria Assunta (Gragnano)
S. Michele (Guamo)
S. Iacopo (Lammari)
S. Antonio Da Padova (Lappato)
S. Frediano (Lunata)
Santi Maria Assunta e Giovanni Evangelista (Marlia)
S. Lorenzo (Massa Macinaia)
S. Michele (Matraia)
S. Maria Assunta (Paganico)
S. Giorgio (Parezzana)
S. Pietro (Petrognano)
S. Giovanni Battista (Pieve San Paolo)
S. Giovanni Battista (Pieve di Compito)
S. Bartolomeo (Ruota)
S. Colombano (San Colombano)
S. Gennaro (San Gennaro)
S. Ginese (San Ginese)
S. Giusto (San Giusto di Compito)
S. Leonardo (San Leonardo in Treponzio)
S. Martino (San Martino in Colle)
S. Margherita (Santa Margherita)
S. Andrea (Sant’Andrea di Compito)
S. Andrea (Sant’Andrea in Caprile)
S. Lorenzo (Segromigno in Monte)
SS. Vergine dei Dolori (Segromigno in Piano)
S. Stefano (Tassignano)
S. Maria Assunta (Tofori)
S. Pietro (Toringo)
S. Frediano (Valgiano)
Santi Vincenzo e Stefano (Verciano)
S. Pietro (Vorno)
Careggine
Santi Pietro e Paolo
S. Giacomo Maggiore Apostolo (Capanne-Isola Santa)
S. Antonio Abate (Capricchia)
S. Giacomo Maggiore Apostolo (Isola Santa)
Castelnuovo di Garfagnana
S. Francesco d’Assisi
S. Michele Arcangelo
Santi Pietro e Paolo
SS. Trinità e dei Santi Pietro e Paolo
Santi Pietro Prospero e Caterina (Antisciana)
S. Andrea Apostolo (Cerretoli)
S. Bartolomeo Apostolo (Gragnanella)
Santi Martino Vescovo e Rocco (Palleroso)
S. Donato Vescovo e Martire (Rontano)
Castiglione di Garfagnana
Santi Michele e Pietro Apostolo
S. Martino (Cerageto)
S. Bartolomeo Apostolo (Chiozza)
SS. Salvatore e S.Antonio Da Padova (Mozzanella)
Santi Pellegrino e Bianco (San Pellegrino in Alpe)
Santi Paolino e Barbara (Valbona)
Coreglia Antelminelli
S. Michele
Santi Leonardo e Silvestro (Calavorno)
Santi Pietro e Paolo (Ghivizzano)
S. Cassiano (Gromignana)
S. Stefano (Lucignana)
Santi Lorenzo e Lazzaro (Piano di Coreglia)
S. Maria Assunta (Tereglio)
Fabbriche di Vallico
S. Giacomo Apostolo
Santi Marco e Leonardo (Gragliana)
S. Michele Arcangelo (Vallico Sopra)
S. Giacomo Apostolo (Vallico Sotto)
Fosciandora
S. Giuliano Martire (Campo)
S. Pietro Apostolo (Lupinaia)
S. Michele Arcangelo (Migliano)
S. Silvestro (Riana)
S. Martino Vescovo (Treppignana)
Gallicano
San Jacopo Apostolo
S. Margherita Martire (Bolognana)
S. Genesio Martire (Cardoso)
Santi Pietro e Paolo (Fiattone)
S. Michele Arcangelo (Perpoli)
Santi Pietro e Paolo (Trassilico)
S. Martino Vescovo (Verni)
Giuncugnano
S. Antonino Martire
S. Andrea Apostolo (Magliano)
S. Antonio Abate (Ponteccio)
Lucca
San Lorenzo
Santa Maria Forisportam
San Pietro
SS. Frediano e Tommaso
SS. Michele Paolino e Alessandro
SS. Pietro e Leonardo
San Michele (Antraccoli)
S. Leonardo (Aquileia)
S. Bartolomeo (Arancio)
S. Giovanni Battista (Arliano)
S. Frediano (Arsina)
S. Donato (Balbano)
S. Lorenzo (Cappella)
S. Maria Assunta (Carignano)
S. Tommaso (Castagnori)
S. Martino (Castiglioncello)
S. Pietro (Cerasomma)
Santi Giusto e Barbera (Chiatri)
S. Bartolomeo (Ciciana)
S. Frediano (Deccio di Brancoli)
S. Maria Assunta (Fagnano)
S. Bartolomeo (Formentale)
S. Andrea (Gattaiola)
S. Stefano (Gugliano)
S. Andrea (Maggiano)
S. Ambrogio (Massa Pisana)
S. Andrea (Mastiano)
S. Michele (Meati)
S. Quirico (Monte San Quirico)
S. Giovanni Battista (Montuolo)
S. Michele (Mugnano)
Santi Ippolito e Cassiano (Mutigliano)
S. Matteo (Nave)
S. Giuseppe (Nozzano)
S. Pietro (Nozzano San Pietro)
S. Pietro (Ombreglio)
S. Maria Assunta (Palmata)
S. Maria Assunta (Piazza di Brancoli)
S. Frediano (Piazzano)
S. Lorenzo (Picciorana)
S. Stefano (Pieve Santo Stefano)
S. Giorgio (Pieve di Brancoli)
S. Pietro (Ponte San Pietro)
Natività di Maria SS. (Pontetetto)
S. Stefano (Pozzuolo)
S. Andrea (Saltocchio)
S. Cassiano (San Cassiano a Vico)
S. Cassiano (San Cassiano Moriano)
S. Concordio (San Concordio di Moriano)
S. Concordio (San Concordio in Contrada)
S. Donato (San Donato)
S. Filippo (San Filippo)
S. Gemignano (San Gemignano di Moriano)
Santi Giusto Lorenzo e Andrea (San Giusto di Brancoli)
S. Ilario (San Ilario di Brancoli)
S. Lorenzo (San Lorenzo a Vaccoli)
S. Macario (San Macario in Monte)
S. Iacopo (San Macario in Piano)
S. Marco (San Marco)
S. Martino (San Martino in Vignale)
Santi Michele e Lorenzo (San Michele Moriano)
S. Michele (San Michele in Escheto)
S. Pancrazio (San Pancrazio)
Santi Quirico e Giulitta (San Quirico Moriano)
S. Vito (San Vito)
S. Maria Assunta (Santa Maria a Colle)
S. Maria Assunta (Santa Maria del Giudice)
S. Stefano (Santo Stefano di Moriano)
S. Alessio (Sant’Alessio)
S. Michele (Sant’Angelo in Campo)
S. Anna (Sant’Anna)
SS. Annunziata (Sant’Annunziata)
S. Maria Assunta (Sesto di Moriano)
S. Giorgio (Sorbano del Giudice)
S. Lorenzo (Sorbano del Vescovo)
S. Donato (Stabbiano)
S. Andrea (Tempagnano di Lunata)
S. Nicolao (Torre)
S. Martino (Tramonte)
SS. Annunziata (Vecoli)
S. Giorgio (Vicopelago)
Massarosa
Santi Iacopo e Andrea
Santi Caterina e Prospero (Bozzano)
S. Frediano (Compignano)
S. Michele (Corsanico)
Santi Nicolao e Giusto (Gualdo di Massarosa)
S. Lorenzo (Massaciuccoli)
S. Andrea (Mommio Borgo)
S. Lucia (Montigiano)
Madonna del Buon Consiglio (Piano Dal Quercione)
S. Francesco d’Assisi (Piano di Conca)
Sacro Cuore di Gesù (Piano di Mommio)
S. Pantaleone (Pieve a Elici)
Santi Stefano e Michele (Quiesa)
S. Maria Assunta (Stiava)
Minucciano
Nostra Signora della Guardia
S. Michele Arcangelo
S. Maria Assunta (Agliano)
Santi Simone e Giuda (Castagnola)
Santi Giusto e Clemente (Gorfigliano)
S. Bartolomeo Apostolo e S.Rocco (Gramolazzo)
S. Nicolao (Metra)
S. Lorenzo Martire (Pieve San Lorenzo)
S. Giacomo Maggiore Apostolo (Pugliano)
S. Maria Assunta (Sermezzana)
SS. Annunziata (Verrucolette)
Molazzana
S. Bartolomeo Apostolo
S. Martino
S. Sisto Ii Papa e Martire (Brucciano)
S. Lorenzo Martire (Cascio)
S. Maria e S.Rocco (Eglio)
S. Frediano Vescovo (Sassi)
Pescaglia
Santi Pietro e Paolo
S. Elisabetta (Celle)
Santi Michele e Caterina (Colognora)
Santi Simone e Giuda (Convalle)
Santi Pietro e Paolo (Focchia)
Santi Andrea e Ansano (Foce di Bucino)
S. Michele (Fondagno)
Santi Ippolito e Cassiano (Gello)
S. Maria Assunta (Loppeglia)
S. Pietro (Loppeglia-Fiano)
S. Giovanni Battista (Monsagrati)
S. Maria Assunta (Pascoso)
S. Bartolomeo (Piegaio)
S. Martino (San Martino in Freddana)
S. Rocco (San Rocco in Turrite)
S. Bartolomeo (Torcigliano)
Santi Simone e Giuda (Vetriano)
S. Stefano (Villa a Roggio)
Piazza al Serchio
S. Bartolomeo Apostolo
S. Pietro Apostolo
S. Maria Assunta (Borsigliana)
S. Leonardo (Cogna)
Santi Martiri Margherita e Giorgio (Gragnana)
S. Giovanni Battista (Livignano)
S. Matteo Apostolo ed Evangelista (Nicciano)
Santi Donnino e Biagio (San Donnino)
S. Michele Arcangelo (San Michele)
Santi Anastasio e Vincenzo (Sant’Anastasio)
Pieve Fosciana
S. Giovanni Battista
S. Martino (Bargecchia)
S. Regolo Vescovo e Martire (Bargecchia)
S. Magno (Pontecosi)
S. Lorenzo Martire (Sillico)
Porcari
S. Giusto
Sacro Cuore di Gesù (Padule)
Natività di Maria SS. (Rughi)
San Romano in Garfagnana
S. Romano Martire
S. Giovanni Battista (Caprignana)
S. Giovanni Battista (Orzaglia)
S. Romano (San Romano)
S. Martino Vescovo (Sillicagnana)
S. Lorenzo Martire (Verrucole)
S. Rocco (Vibbiana)
Santi Giuseppe e Pantaleone (Villetta)
Sillano
S. Bartolomeo Apostolo
Beata Maria Vergine del Buon Consiglio (Capanne)
Santi Ippolito e Cassiano (Dalli Sopra)
S. Michele (Dalli Sotto)
S. Martino Vescovo (Villa Soraggio)
Stazzema
S. Agostino Vescovo (Arni)
Santi Anna e Antonio (Palagnana)
Vagli Sotto
S. Regolo Vescovo
S. Bartolomeo Apostolo (Roggio)
S. Lorenzo Martire (Vagli Sopra)
Vergemoli
Santi Quirico e Giulitta
S. Tommaso Apostolo (Calomini)
S. Maria della Neve (Campolemisi)
S. Francesco d’Assisi (Fornovolasco)
S. Pellegrino (San Pellegrinetto)
Viareggio
Natività della Beata Vergine Maria
S. Andrea
S. Antonio
S. Giovanni Bosco
S. Paolino
S. Rita
Sette Santi Fondatori
Maria SS. Assunta (Migliarina)
Madonna del Buon Consiglio (Terminetto)
S. Giuseppe (Torre del Lago Puccini)
Resurrezione di Nostro Signore (Varignano)
Villa Basilica
S. Maria Assunta
Santi Iacopo e Ginese (Boveglio)
S. Michele (Colognora)
S. Lorenzo (Pariana)
Villa Collemandina
Santi Sisto e Margherita
S. Leonardo Abate (Canigiano)
S. Lorenzo Martire (Corfino)
S. Maria Assunta (Magnano)
S. Michele Arcangelo (Massa di Sasso Rosso)
Beata Maria Vergine di Caravaggio (Pianacci)
S. Michele Arcangelo (Sassorosso)

=== Province of Pistoia ===
Pescia
S. Frediano (Aramo)
S. Bartolomeo (Collodi)
S. Michele (Fibbialla)
Santi Martino e Sisto (Medicina)
Santi Andrea e Lucia (Pontito)
S. Quirico (San Quirico Valleriana)
S. Maria Assunta (Stiappa)
Santi Quirico e Giulitta (Veneri)
