= Giuseppe Benvenuti =

Giuseppe Benvenuti (1723 – after 1764) was an Italian physician.

He was born and studied in Lucca. He practiced medicine in Sarzana in 1755, and later in at the thermal baths in the duchy of Lucca (Bagni di Lucca). He was prolific in texts in Latin, proposing various cures for a contemporary contagious fever, using mercury, a method supported by the contemporary Bertini. He wrote about rabies, and other conditions. He wrote about the medical benefits of thermal baths.
