= San Michele a Castiglione =

Parish church in Castiglione di Garfagnana, Tuscany, Italy

Church of Saints Michael and Peter
- Chiesa dei Santi Michele e Pietro
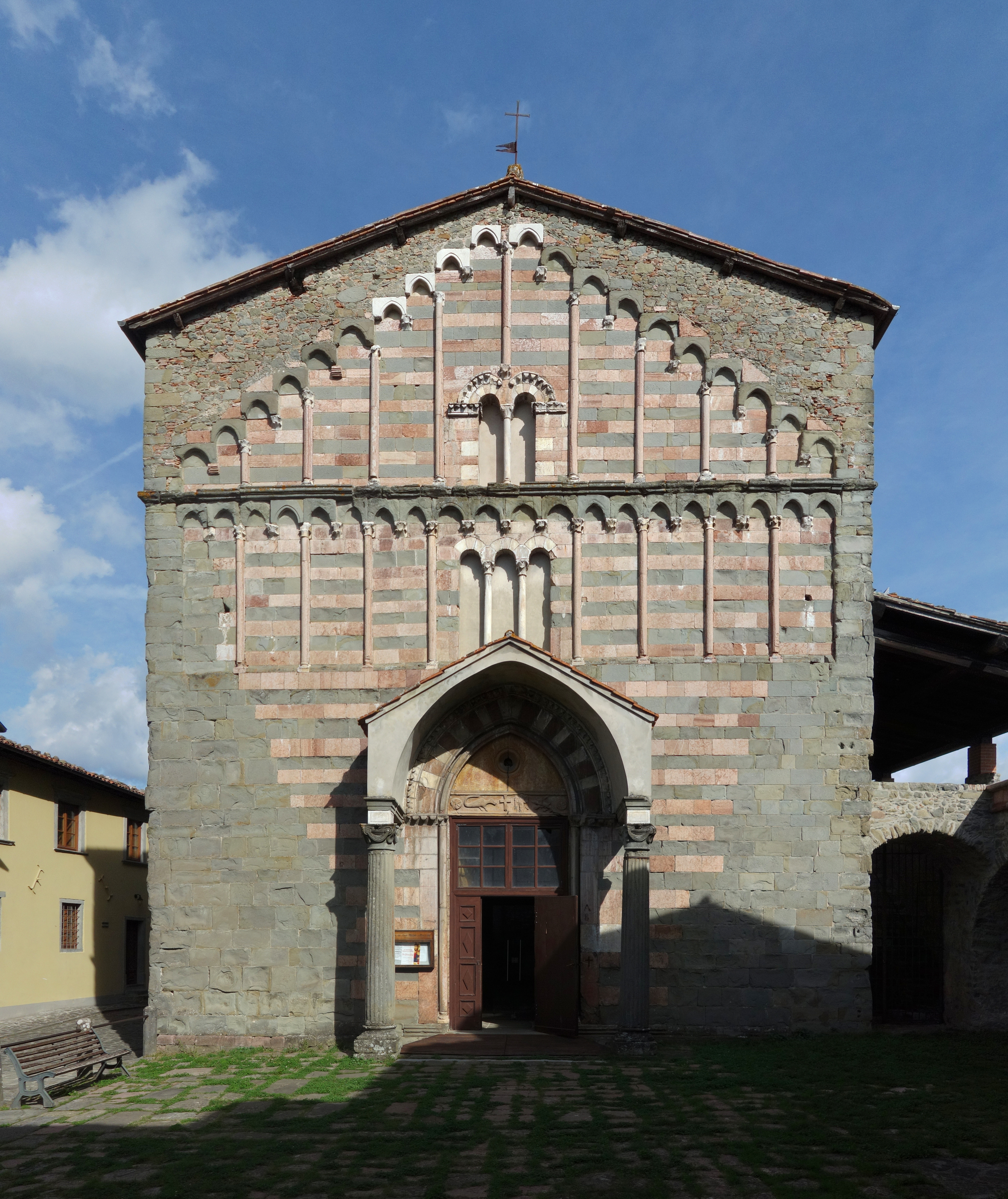
- Church of Saints Michael and Peter
- Location: Castiglione di Garfagnana, Tuscany, Italy
- Denomination: Catholic Church

History
- Dedication: Saint Michael the Archangel and Saint Peter the Apostle

Architecture
- Completed: 18th century

Administration
- Diocese: Archdiocese of Lucca

The Church of Saints Michael and Peter (Italian: Chiesa dei Santi Michele e Pietro), also known simply as the Church of San Michele, is a 12th-century, Roman Catholic church located in the town of Castiglione di Garfagnana. It is the parish church of Castiglione di Garfagnana, in the Province of Lucca and the Archdiocese of Lucca. It belongs to the Garfagnana pastoral area.

== History ==
The first mention of a chapel in Castiglione di Garfagnana dates to 1168 and is contained in a bull of Pope Alexander III, which states that it depended on the Pieve of San Giovanni Battista. An inscription records the consecration of the church in 1197 by Guido III, Bishop of Lucca; it is not known whether this refers to the same building mentioned in the earlier document. Of the original structure, only the sandstone masonry survives, partially preserved in the façade and on the northern side.

The church underwent restoration work during the 13th century and again in the 15th century, when it was granted a baptismal font, making it independent from the mother church.

At the end of the 18th century, the parish church was extensively rebuilt in several phases, including the reconstruction of the apse. In 1771 the roof was reinforced, in 1789 a wall was consolidated, and between 1791 and 1792 the presbytery was remodelled. At the conclusion of the works, the church was blessed in 1810.

In the second half of the 1960s, in accordance with post-Second Vatican Council liturgical norms, a new ambo and an altar facing the congregation were installed. Further restoration work was carried out in 1988.

== Description ==
=== Exterior ===
The church’s gabled façade, in Romanesque style and inspired by Pisan–Lucchese architecture, is traditionally dated to the late 14th century, in keeping with the year 1403 recorded in an inscription preserved inside. The façade is decorated with loggias, originally extending along the sides, composed of pointed blind arcades resting on corbels or on slender vertical columns with water-leaf capitals. Behind them, contrasting masonry alternates stone and red marble. The vertical emphasis once continued in the gable and is still evident in the trifora and a bifora of Gothic form, both now walled up.

The entrance portal is surmounted by a lunette that was once frescoed and by a lintel carved in low relief depicting Saint Michael fighting the dragon and the lion, the heraldic symbol of the town, datable to the second half of the 14th century. The portal is protected by a prothyrum supported by two columns with festooned capitals.

Adjacent to the church is the square-based bell tower, resting on a tower-like structure; the belfry has openings on each side.

=== Interior ===
The interior consists of a single nave, opening onto recesses that house the side altars. The walls are articulated by pilasters supporting a projecting cornice, above which rises the vault. At the end of the nave is the raised presbytery, closed by a polygonal apse.

The church preserves several notable works of art, including an altarpiece depicting the Madonna and Child, painted by Giuliano di Simone in 1389. This is the only panel signed and dated by the artist; although damaged and marked by losses, it shows references to the Lucchese works of Spinello Aretino.

A 15th-century ciborium was probably produced in the workshop of Matteo Civitali and was originally located in the now-suppressed chapel of Saint Christopher in Verrucchia.

The altar of Our Lady of Sorrows is adorned with a valuable scagliola antependium, a late-17th-century work by Carlo Gibertoni, originally from Carpi and active in Lucca from 1686.

The church also houses a Crucifix of the “sorrowful” type, attributable to the Master of the Crucifix of Camaiore, a follower of Giovanni Pisano. Compared to his master, the work lacks an organic conception of the body and shows a more restrained expressiveness. This example is distinguished by the partial preservation of its original polychromy and by a softer modelling than comparable works in the Lucchese area or the Serchio Valley.

In the apse, set within a niche, is a mid-18th-century marble statue of Saint Michael, of modest quality, purchased by the community in Carrara during the Napoleonic suppressions and brought to the church in 1795.

The adjoining Museum Storage of Sacred Art preserves, among other works, a fragmentary panel depicting Saint Pellegrino, possibly part of a lost triptych once recorded in the Church of San Tommaso di Conturbia (also known as the Oratory of San Pellegrino di Marcione), datable to the late 15th century and attributable to a painter influenced by Vincenzo Frediani. The collection also includes three wooden statues depicting the Madonna and Child, Saint Peter, and Saint Paul, executed by Vincenzo di Bartolomeo Civitali between 1511 and 1515 and originally placed in the niches of a wooden altarpiece similar to that of the parish church of Villa Collemandina.

== See also ==
- Castiglione di Garfagnana
- Roman Catholic Archdiocese of Lucca
