= Corsagna =

- Frazione
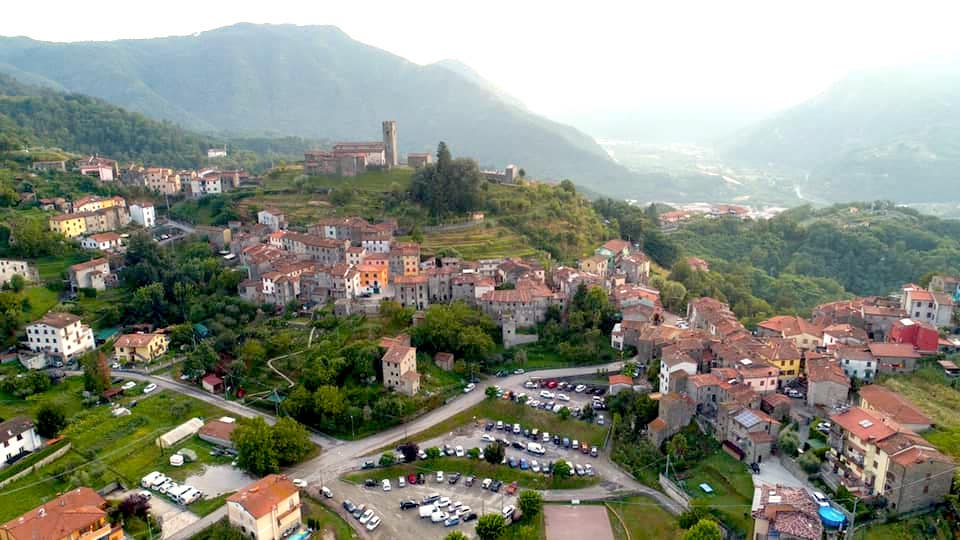
- Aerial view of Corsagna

- Location of Corsagna in Italy
- Coordinates: 43°58′38.9″N 10°33′50″E
- Country: Italy
- Region: Tuscany
- Province: Lucca (LU)
- Comune: Borgo a Mozzano
- Elevation: 341 m (1,119 ft)

Population (2011)
  - Total: 662
- Time zone: UTC+1 (CET)
  - Summer (DST): UTC+2 (CEST)
- Postal code: 55023
- Dialing code: (+39) 0583

Corsagna is a village in Tuscany, central Italy, administratively a frazione of the comune of Borgo a Mozzano, province of Lucca.

Corsagna is about 25 km from Lucca and 5 km from Borgo a Mozzano.

== Bibliography ==
- Emanuele Repetti (1833). "Corsagna". Dizionario geografico fisico storico della Toscana (in Italian). Vol. 1. Florence. p. 806.
