= Charles Isidore Hemans =

English antiquary

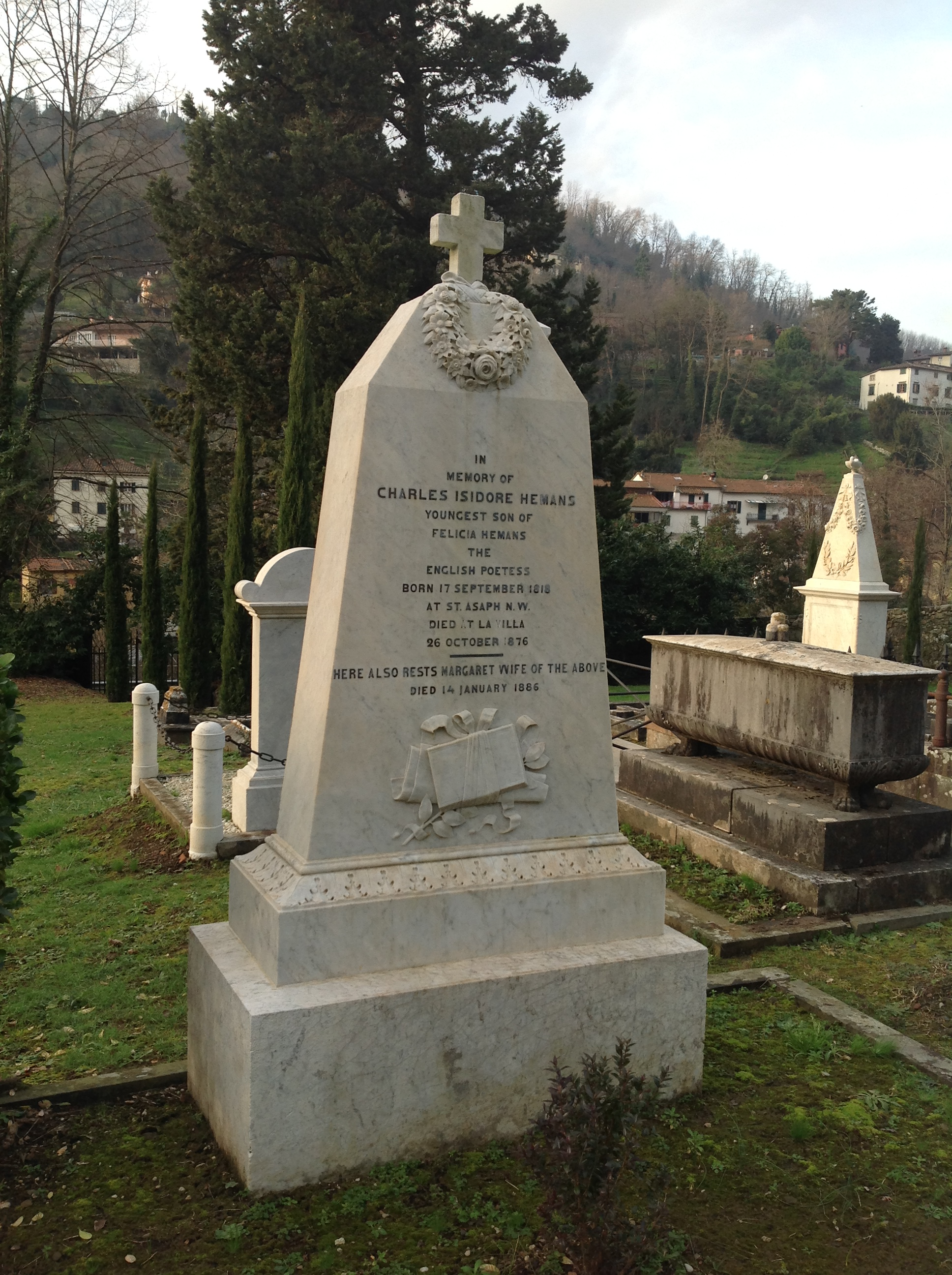
Cimitero Inglese, Bagni di Lucca, Charles Isidore Hemans (1817–1876)

Charles Isidore Hemans (1817–1876) was an English antiquary.

Hemans, youngest son of Felicia Dorothea Hemans, poet, was born in 1817. He was a handsome boy and the special favourite of his mother. He accompanied her on a visit to Abbotsford in 1829, and was with her at the time of her death in 1835.

He left England early in life, and, after residing in various places on the continent, finally settled in Rome and made Roman history and archæology his chief study. He was the originator in 1846 of the Roman Advertiser, the first English paper published in the city. He helped to establish the English Archæological Society there in 1865, and afterwards became its honorary secretary and librarian. To English visitors in Rome and to English residents, he was always a friendly guide, noted for his amiability and modesty, and his writings are invaluable to students of Italian ecclesiastical history and archæology. After a serious illness at Spezia in the summer of 1875 he was removed to Bagni di Lucca, where he died on 26 Oct. 1876. He was buried in the English cemetery there.

== Bibliography ==
- Catholic Italy pt. i. Rome and Papal States, 1860.
- The Story of Monuments in Rome and her Environs Florence, 1864–5, 2 parts.
- A History of Ancient Christianity and Sacred Art in Italy London, 1866.
- A History of Mediæval Christianity and Sacred Art in Italy, A.D. 900–1450. In Rome from 1350 to 1500 1869–72, 2 vols. A sequel to the previous work.
- Historic and Monumental Rome a handbook, London, 1874.
