= Valdottavo =

- Frazione
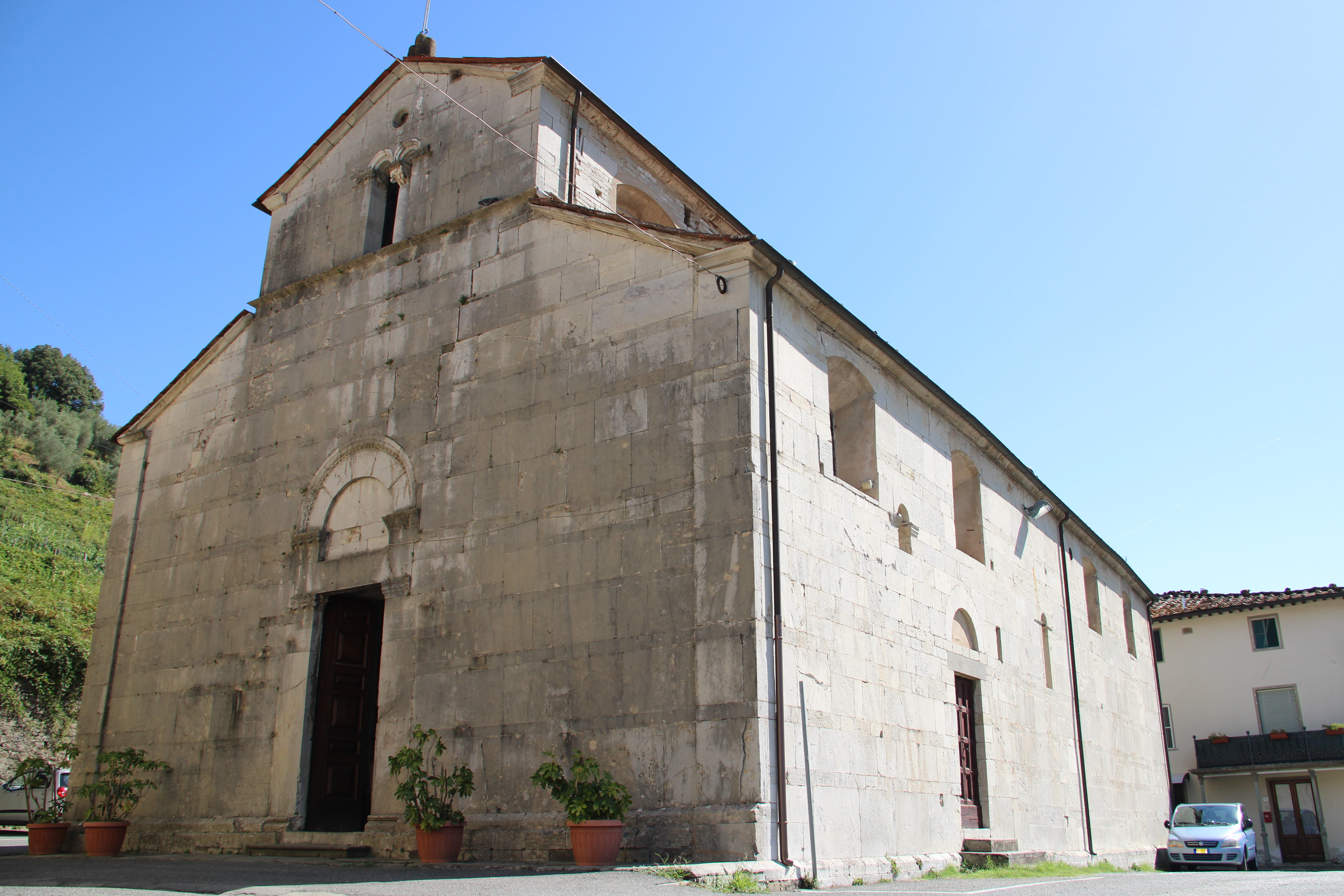
- The church of San Pietro

- Location of Valdottavo in Italy
- Coordinates: 43°56′31.1″N 10°28′41.8″E
- Country: Italy
- Region: Tuscany
- Province: Lucca (LU)
- Comune: Borgo a Mozzano
- Elevation: 100 m (330 ft)
- Time zone: UTC+1 (CET)
  - Summer (DST): UTC+2 (CEST)
- Postal code: 55023
- Dialing code: (+39) 0583

Valdottavo is a village in Tuscany, central Italy, administratively a frazione of the comune of Borgo a Mozzano, province of Lucca.

Rocca is about 16 km from Lucca and 7 km from Borgo a Mozzano.

== Monuments ==
- Church of San Pietro
- Church of San Rocco
