= Orto Botanico "Pania di Corfino" =

Botanical garden in tuscany

Giardino Botanico "Maria Ansaldi" Pania di Corfino
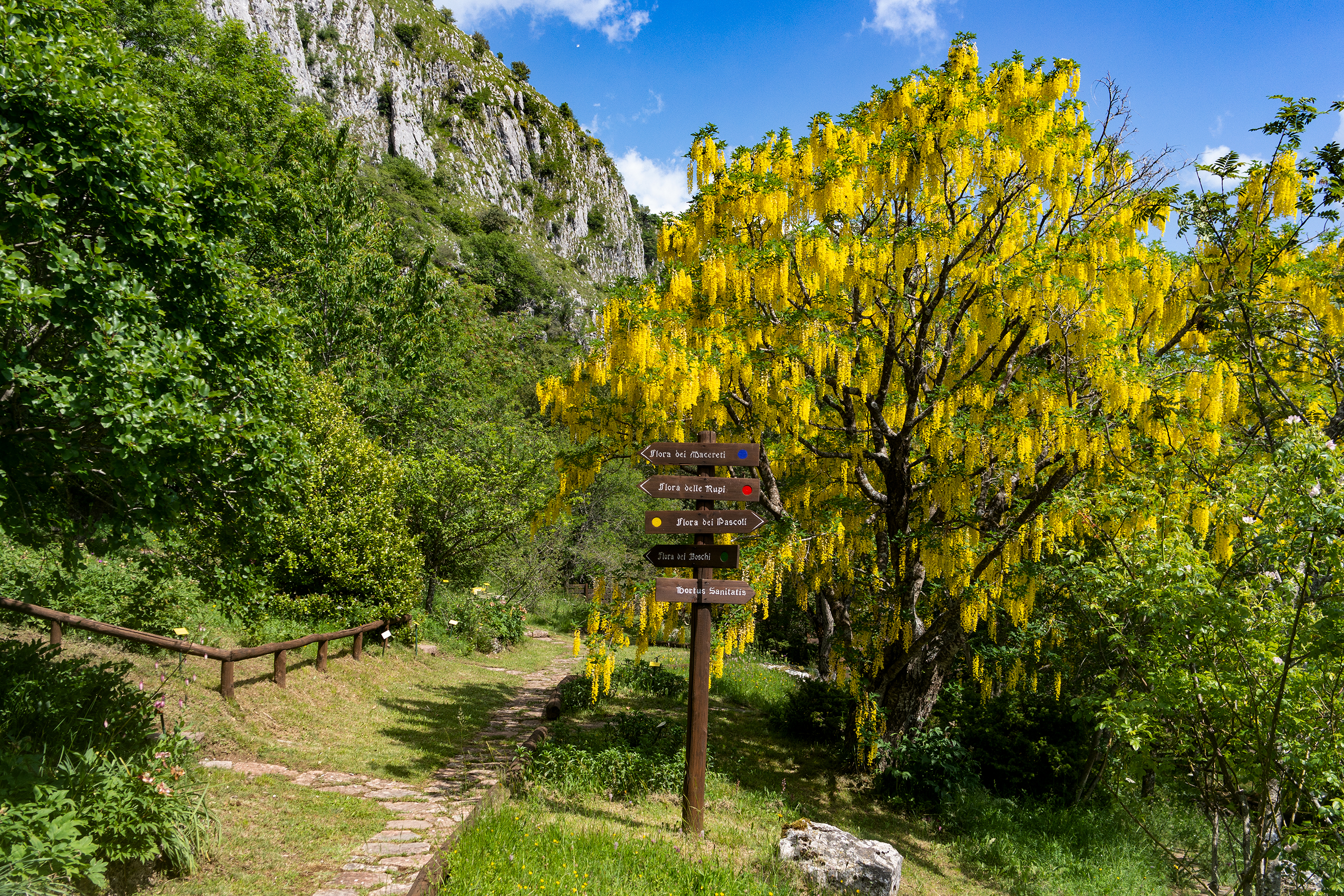
- View of the main path of the Botanical Garden
- Interactive map of Giardino Botanico "Maria Ansaldi" Pania di Corfino
- Type: Botanical Garden
- Location: Isera, Villa Collemandina
- Coordinates: 44.202478°N 10.374800°E
- Elevation: 1370
- Opened: 1984
- Owner: Unione Comuni Garfagnana
- Plants: 400
- Website: http://www.ortobotanicoitalia.it/toscana/paniadicorfino/

The Giardino Botanico "Maria Ansaldi" Pania di Corfino (about 7500m^{2}) is a botanical garden located an altitude of 1370 m in the Appennino Tosco-Emiliano National Park, near the visitor center of Orecchiella Natural Park in Isera, Corfino, Villa Collemandina, Province of Lucca, Tuscany, Italy. It is open daily in the warmer months; an admission fee is charged.

The garden was established in 1984 to collect and preserve indigenous flora of the Apennine Mountains, Garfagnana valley and Apuan Alps . As such it reproduces environments typical of the region, including heath, hills, moor, pasture, and scree; it also contains an arboretum.

== Specimens ==
Today the garden contains about 400 varieties of plants as well as botanical specimens and fossils.

Species of interest include:

- Alyssoides utriculata
- Caltha palustris
- Eriophorum sp.
- Erysimum pseudorhaeticum
- Gentiana purpurea
- Geum rivale
- Globularia incanescens
- Hesperis laciniata
- Lilium bulbiferum subsp. croceum
- Lilium martagon
- Linaria purpurea
- Orchis mascula
- Paeonia officinalis
- Primula apennina
- Saxifraga callosa subsp. callosa
- Sempervivum tectorum
- Swertia perennis
- Trollius europaeus.

Trees and woody plants include:

- Abies alba
- Carpinus betulus
- Castanea sativa
- Fagus sylvatica
- Juniperus nana
- Lonicera alpigena
- Ostrya carpinifolia
- Picea excelsa
- Prunus mahaleb
- Rhododendron ferrugineum
- Sambucus racemosa

== See also ==
- List of botanical gardens in Italy
