= Bagni Caldi =

Hamlet in Tuscany, Italy

- Frazione
- Location of Bagni Caldi in Italy
- Coordinates: 44°00′44.6″N 10°34′54.2″E
- Country: Italy
- Region: Tuscany
- Province: Lucca (LU)
- Comune: Bagni di Lucca
- Elevation: 214 m (702 ft)
- Time zone: UTC+1 (CET)
  - Summer (DST): UTC+2 (CEST)
- Postal code: 55022
- Dialing code: (+39) 0583

Bagni Caldi is a village (frazione) of the municipality of Bagni di Lucca, in the province of Lucca, Tuscany, central Italy. The village is known for its historic thermal springs, which have been used since Roman times.

== Geography ==
Bagni Caldi owes its reputation to its thermal springs, which were already used during the Roman period and became a popular spa destination in the modern era. It occupies a hillside overlooking the valley of the Lima River. The village extends along the slope above Ponte a Serraglio, where the river is crossed by a historic bridge that has traditionally served as the main access to the thermal district.

The village contains two natural steam caves, the Grotta Grande and the smaller Grotta Paolina, named after Pauline Bonaparte. The sulphate–bicarbonate–calcium mineral waters are traditionally used for the treatment of rheumatic conditions and stress-related disorders.

== History ==
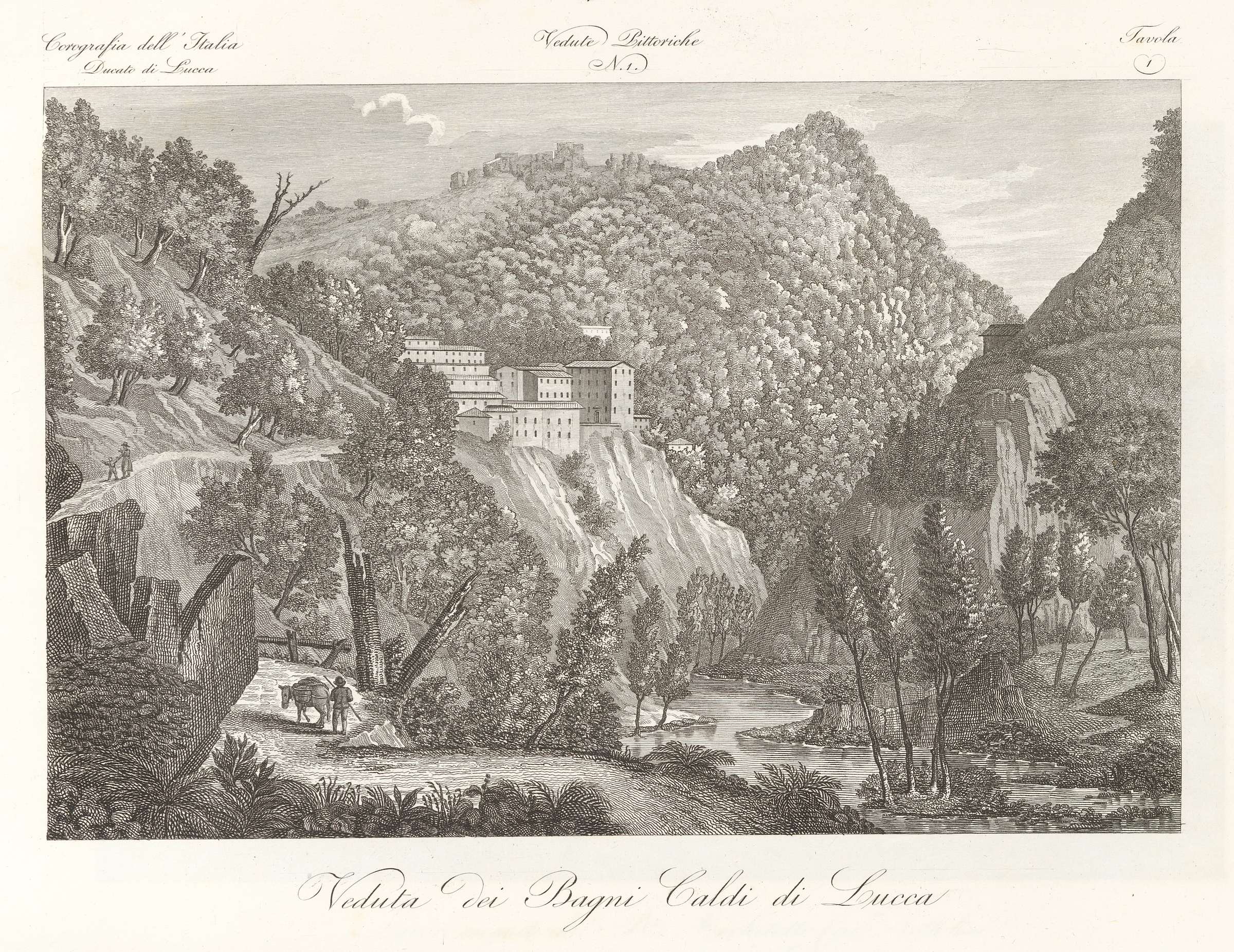
View of Bagni Caldi in Lucca (1845)

The settlement was already frequented during the Roman period because of its thermal springs. It was fortified in the 12th century and later became a possession of the Della Lena family. During the Grand Duchy of Tuscany, it served as a summer residence for the grand dukes.

Among its notable visitors were Lord Byron, Eugenio Montale, and Henry James. In his travel book Pictures of Travel (1829–1830), the German poet Heinrich Heine, who stayed at Bagni Caldi, described the place as follows:

"I have never seen a lovelier valley, particularly when one looks from the terrace of the upper bath, where the solemn green cypresses stand down into the village. [...] The great charm of the valley is owning to the circumstance that it is neither too great nor too small―that the soul of the beholder is not forcibly elevated, but rather calmly and gradually inspired with the glorious view."

— Heinrich Heine, Pictures of Travel

== Landmarks ==
- Church of San Martino, built in 1292 by Jacopo di Puccio and extensively remodelled during the 19th century under the Grand Duchy of Tuscany.
- Oratory of the Santissima Annunziata, located in the locality of Colle, was founded in 1469 by Matteo Della Lena. Destroyed in the 1920 earthquake, it was rebuilt and restored in 1962.
- Chapel of the Alpini, a small chapel erected in 1951 on the hillside above the village.
- Palazzo Granducale, later known as the Grande Albergo delle Regie Terme, served as the summer residence of Leopold II, Grand Duke of Tuscany, from 1850. The adjoining park contains a historic specimen of Ginkgo biloba.
- Palazzo Della Lena, the historic residence of the Della Lena family, whose coat of arms survives near the former entrance to the estate.
- Hotel Savoy, a historic hotel incorporating structures dating from the 14th to the 18th century. Traces of a 16th-century fresco depicting the Madonna and Child survive beside its entrance arch.
- Rotonda del Colle, a circular belvedere reached by a woodland path above the village, frequented by distinguished visitors during the 19th century, including Alexandre Dumas, Muhammad Ali of Egypt, and Sándor Teleki.
