= Borgo a Mozzano =

- Comune
- Comune di Borgo a Mozzano
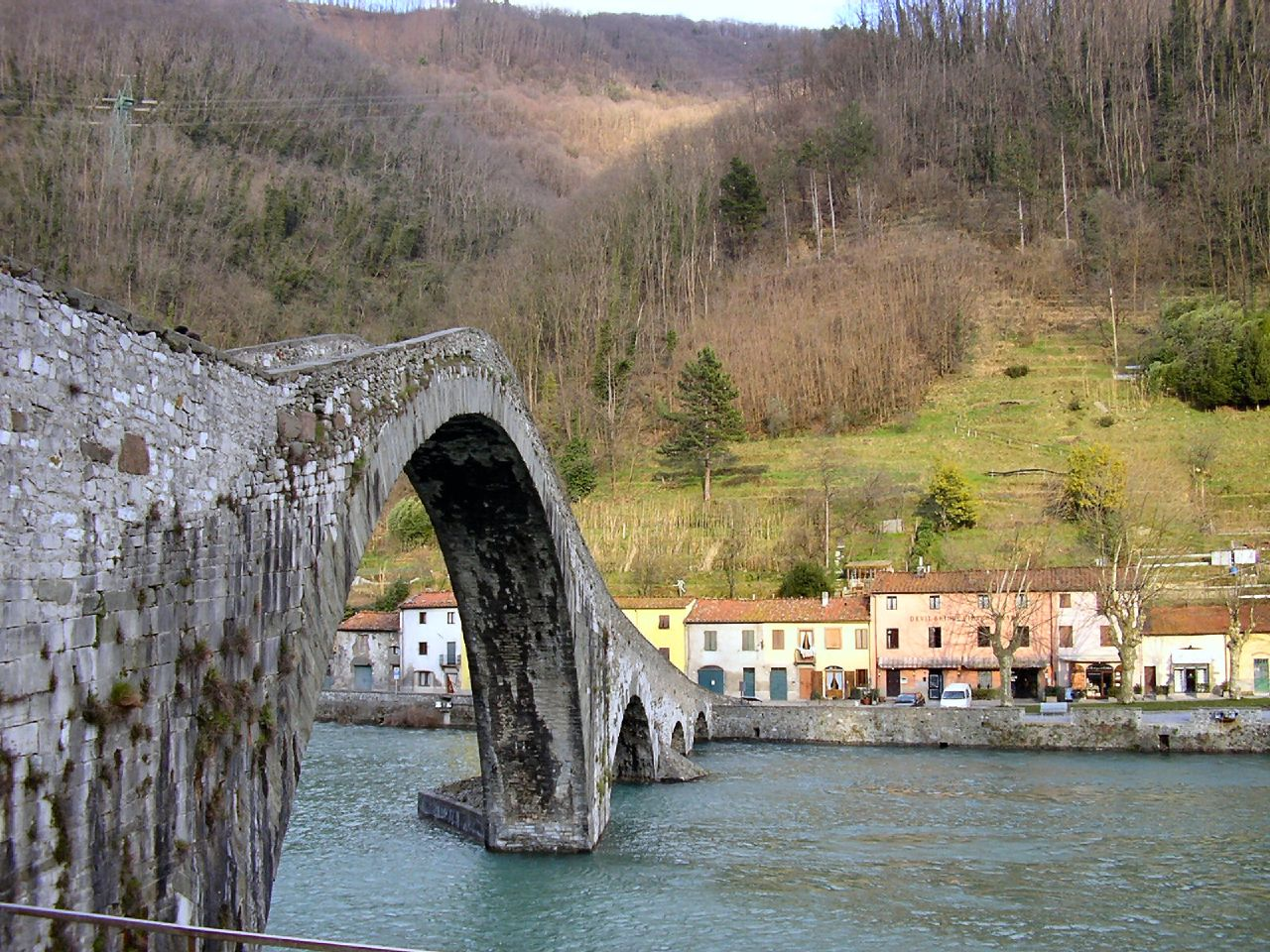
- Ponte della Maddalena.

- Coat of arms

- Location within Italy Location within Tuscany
- Coordinates: 43°58′43″N 10°32′45″E
- Country: Italy
- Region: Tuscany
- Province: Lucca (LU)
- Frazioni: Anchiano, Cerreto, Diecimo, Dezza, Gioviano, Valdottavo, Cune, Corsagna, Tempagnano, Oneta, San Romano, Domazzano, Chifenti, Rocca, Piano Della Rocca, Montrone, Partigliano

Government
  - Mayor: Patrizio Andreuccetti

Area
  - Total: 72.2 km^{2} (27.9 sq mi)
- Elevation: 97 m (318 ft)

Population (31 March 2017)
  - Total: 6,978
  - Density: 96.6/km^{2} (250/sq mi)
- Demonym: Borghigiani
- Time zone: UTC+1 (CET)
  - Summer (DST): UTC+2 (CEST)
- Postal code: 55023
- Dialing code: 0583
- Patron saint: Madonna delle Grazie (Our Lady of Grace)
- Website: Official website

Borgo a Mozzano is a town and comune in the province of Lucca, in northern Tuscany (Italy), located on the Serchio River.

== History ==
The town is mentioned for the first time in 879, when a document mentioned one place In loco Mozzano prope Decimo. Later it was held by the Soffredinghi family, and then by the Republic of Lucca.

After the end of the Lucchese independence, it was part of the Grand Duchy of Tuscany and, from 1860, of Unified Italy.

== Main sights ==
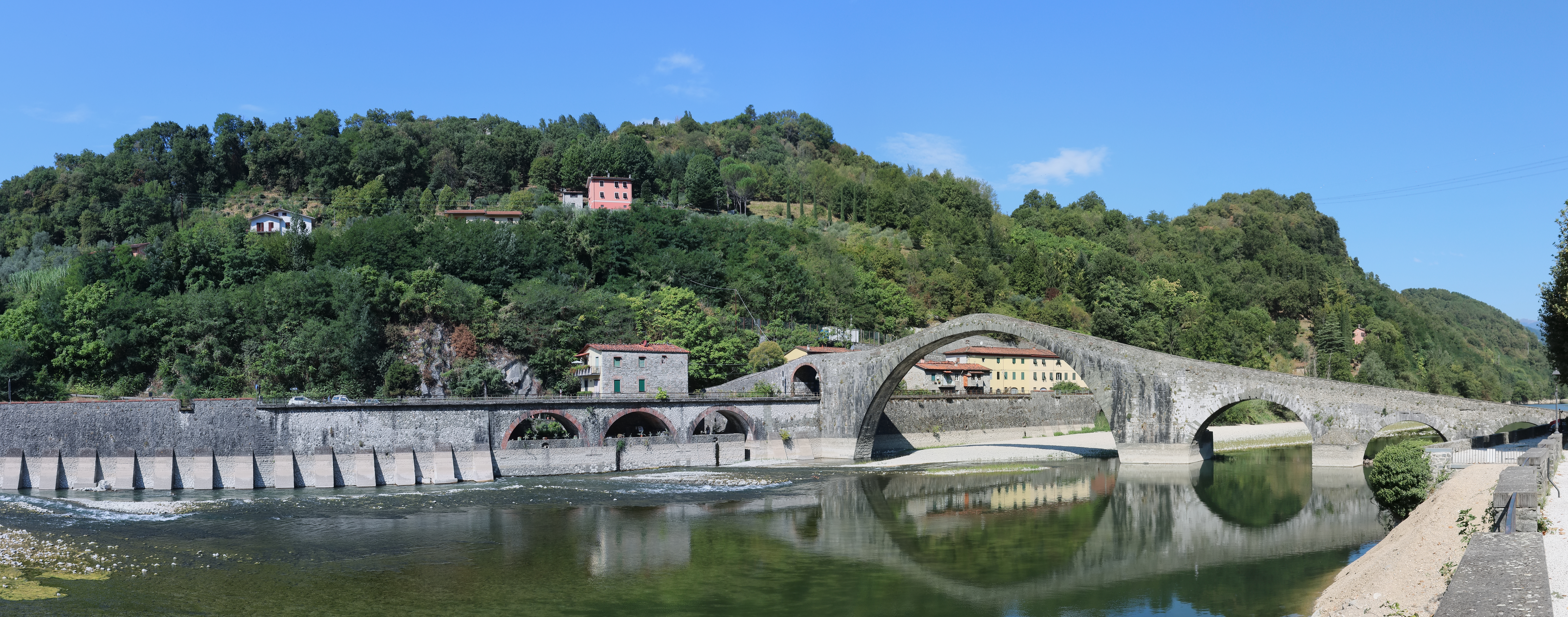
Ponte della Maddalena / Ponte del Diavolo / Devil's Bridge.

Borgo a Mozzano is dominated by the presence of Ponte della Maddalena also called "del Diavolo" (Devil's Bridge). Matilda of Tuscany is believed to have commissioned the bridge which was later renovated by Castruccio Castracani. The Devil's Bridge is located on the SP2 one kilometer north of downtown. The bridge's majestic structure is a popular tourist attraction of the area.

The Gothic Line, a German Second World War military defence line, passed through the comune. Sections of this fortification are well preserved and guided tours of the interior can be arranged.

The church and convent of San Francesco in Borgo a Mozzano was a monastery but now houses a home for the elderly. The 12th-century church of San Martino in Greppo, Borgo a Mozzano is located in the Diecimo district of the comune.

The 19th-century suspension bridge, Ponte delle Catene, Bagni di Lucca or Bridge of Chains, links Chifenti in Borgo a Mozzano to Fornoli in the neighbouring comune of Bagni di Lucca.

== Transportation ==
The town of Borgo a Mozzano is centrally located between the Garfagnana and the Lucchesia, and can be easily reached by car with the SS12 "Brennero" or the SP2 "Lodovica". The nearest major airport (50 min drive) is the Galileo Galilei International Airport of Pisa.

The comune has two train stations, Borgo a Mozzano and Diecimo-Pescaglia, which are served by the Lucca–Aulla railway.

== Notable people ==
- St. John Leonardi, founder of the Clerks Regular of the Mother of God of Lucca
- Giuseppe Antonio Luchi, painter
- Nicolò Fazzi, footballer
- Federico Mattiello, footballer
- Sir Alex Younger, former Chief of MI6, married his wife in Borgo a Mozzano in 1993

== Asteroid ==
Asteroid 44717 Borgoamozzano, discovered by Italian amateur astronomer Sauro Donati in 1999, was named in honor of the town. The official naming citation was published by the Minor Planet Center on 27 August 2019 (M.P.C. 115894).

== Sister cities ==
- Martorell, Spain
- Ålesund, Norway
