= Teatrino di Vetriano, Pescaglia =

Performance stage in Vetriano, Tuscany, Italy

The Teatrino di Vetriano or Small Theater of Vetriano is a small, 19th-century performance stage built in the village of Vetriano, in the commune of Pescaglia, province of Lucca, region of Tuscany, Italy.

The tiny theater was constructed in 1889–1890 at the site of a barn donated for this purpose by the engineer Virgilio Biagini. The rural inhabitants of this area, hungry for access to cultural activities set up a tax fund to pay for the costs of construction. In 1890, the theater, framed by neoclassical decorations was used for musical and dramatic performances, some written and acted by the townsfolk themselves. In the twentieth century, the theater shuttered.

In 1997, the descendants of engineer Biagini donated the theatre to the Fondo Ambiente Italia, who restored the building and now administers the site. The small theater still puts on events, with a maximum audience of 85, and a stage measuring some 71 meters square. Underneath the theatre, there are two dressing rooms and a small costume store.

It won the title of the "smallest historical theater of the world" in the Guinness Book of Records.
