= San Martino in Greppo, Borgo a Mozzano =

Church in Lucca, Italy

San Martino in Greppo is a small Romanesque-style, Roman Catholic church, located in the Diecimo district outside of the town of Borgo a Mozzano in the province of Lucca, Tuscany, Italy.

== History ==
The church was located along the ancient road that linked the Lunigiana valley near Lucca with the Po valley; this church was documented by 979, under the pieve of Diecimo. It operated an adjacent hostel for pilgrims. The present church, visible from the banks of the Serchio, was built in the 12th century. The simple stone structure with a single nave and a semicircular apse was restored in 2009. The interiors lack decoration.
