= San Giorgio a Brancoli, Lucca =

Church building in Lucca, Italy

Coordinates: 43.93585°N 10.52724°E

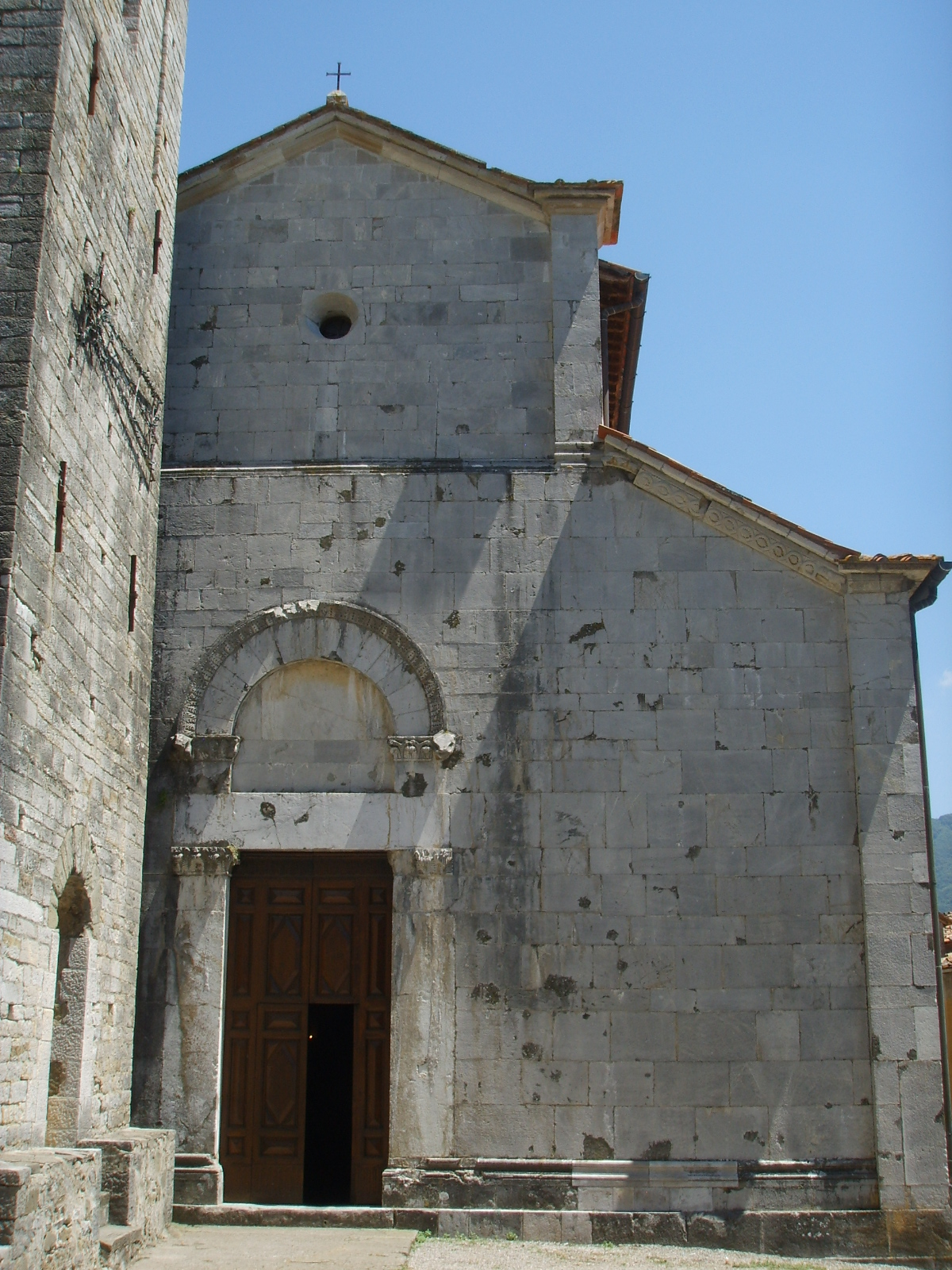
Pieve di brancoli, 00 esterno.

The Pieve di San Giorgio is a Romanesque-style, Roman Catholic rural parish church, located in the Pieve di Brancoli sector outside of the city of Lucca in Tuscany, Italy.

== History ==
A church at the site hosted a baptistry in 1097 under the name of San Giorgio a Brancoli, although that document alludes to its dependence on the pieve of Sesto from 772 to the mid-11th century. The interior still retains an altar and a font with Romanesque sculpture. In the apse is a 13th-century painted crucifix, and in the left nave is a fresco depicting an Annunciation attributed to Giuliano di Simone. A terracotta relief depicting St George is attributed to the studio of Della Robbia.
