= Rocca, Borgo a Mozzano =

Rocca
- Frazione
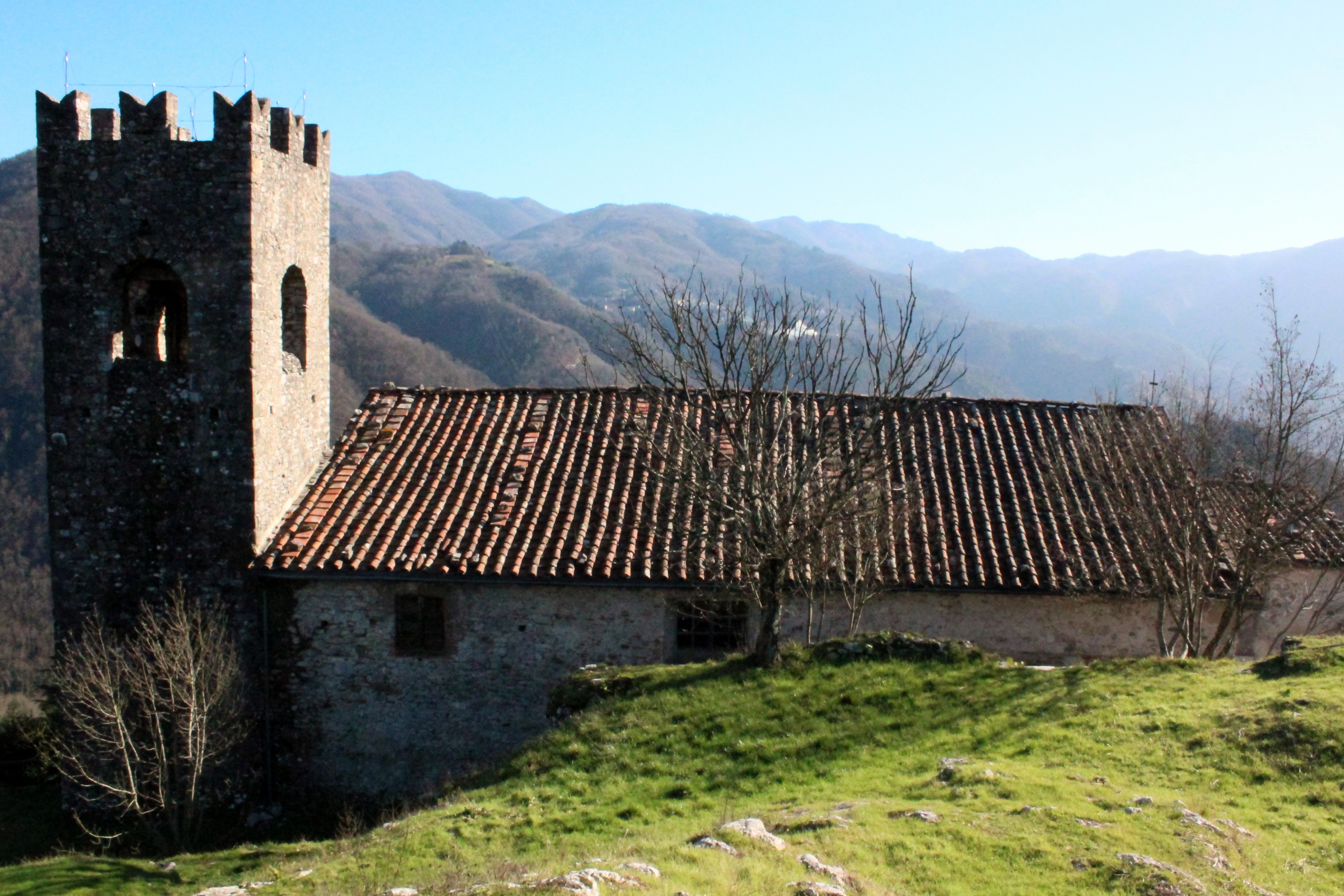
- Santa Maria Assunta in Rocca

- Location of Rocca in Italy
- Coordinates: 43°59′46″N 10°32′47.6″E
- Country: Italy
- Region: Tuscany
- Province: Lucca (LU)
- Comune: Borgo a Mozzano
- Elevation: 314 m (1,030 ft)

Population (2011)
  - Total: 32
- Time zone: UTC+1 (CET)
  - Summer (DST): UTC+2 (CEST)
- Postal code: 55023
- Dialing code: (+39) 0583

Rocca is a village in Tuscany, central Italy, administratively a frazione of the comune of Borgo a Mozzano, province of Lucca.

Rocca is about 25 km from Lucca and 3 km from Borgo a Mozzano.

== Bibliography ==
- Emanuele Repetti (1841). "Rocca sopra Mozzano". Dizionario geografico fisico storico della Toscana (in Italian). Vol. 4. Florence. p. 787.
