= Benabbio =

Village in Tuscany, Italy

- Frazione
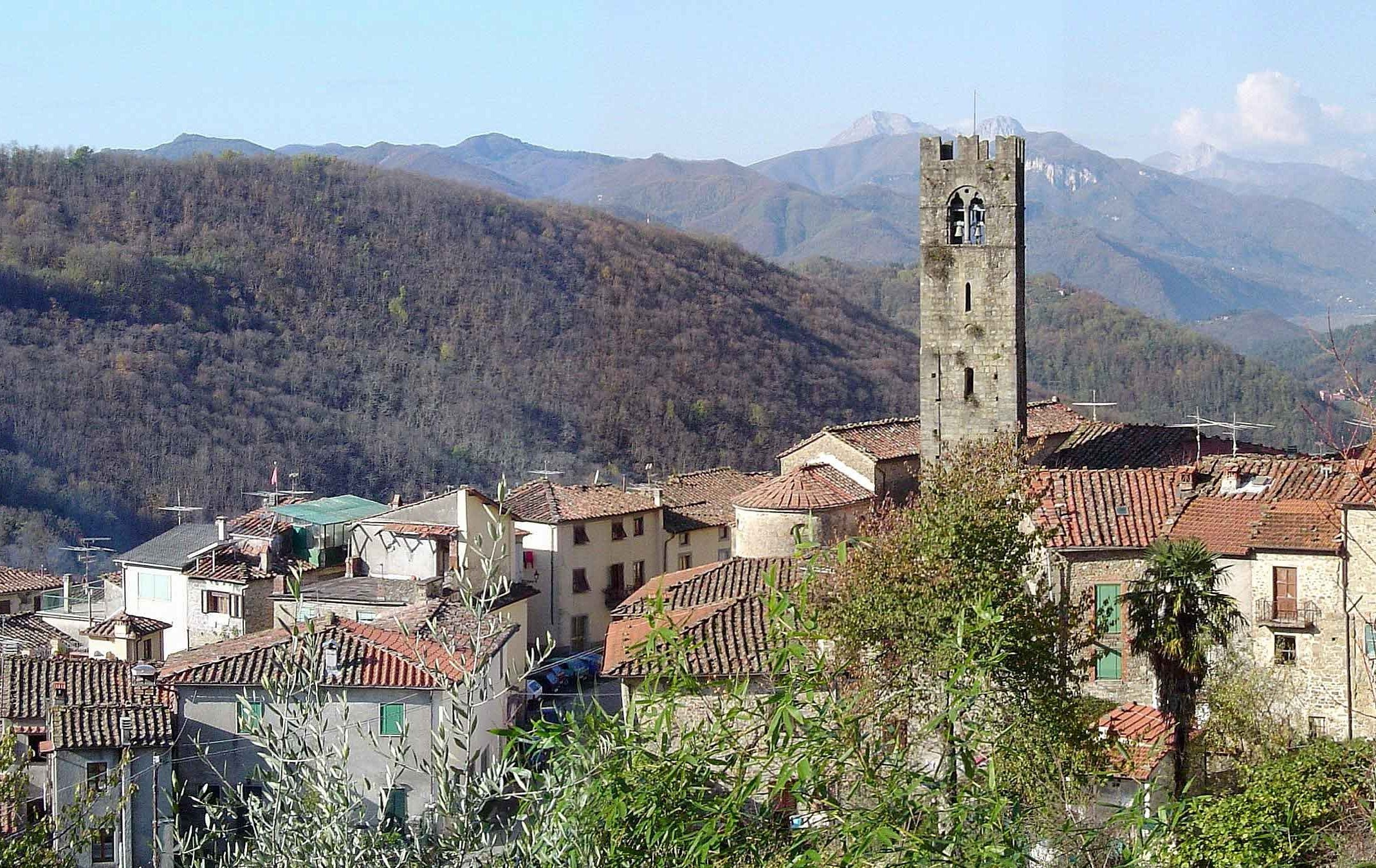

- Location of Benabbio in Italy
- Coordinates: 43°59′56″N 10°36′14″E
- Country: Italy
- Region: Tuscany
- Province: Lucca (LU)
- Comune: Bagni di Lucca
- Elevation: 417 m (1,368 ft)

Population (2011)
  - Total: 295
- Time zone: UTC+1 (CET)
  - Summer (DST): UTC+2 (CEST)
- Postal code: 55022
- Dialing code: (+39) 0583

Benabbio is a frazione (hamlet) of the comune of Bagni di Lucca, in the province of Lucca, Tuscany, central Italy. The village lies on the southwestern slope of the hill known as Bastia (or Castello), at an elevation of around 420 metres above sea level. The ruins of the medieval castle of Benabbio stand on the summit overlooking the settlement.

The place is first documented in 983 under the name Menabla. Archaeological investigations have shown that the castle developed between the 12th and 14th centuries before its dismantling in the mid-14th century.

Within the village are three churches: the parish church of Santa Maria Assunta, the oratory of the Most Holy Sacrament, and the oratory of the Holy Trinity, which houses the Museum of Sacred Art.

== Sources ==
- Fornaciari, Antonio; Coschino, Francesco (2012). "Il castello di Benabbio in Val di Lima (LU): le trasformazioni insediative tra XII e XIV secolo". Atti del VI Congresso Nazionale di Archeologia Medievale, Firenze 2012. All'Insegna del Giglio. pp. 257–264.
- Repetti, Emanuele. Dizionario geografico fisico storico della Toscana. Vol. 1. Florence. p. 295.
