= Corfino =

Village in Tuscany, Italy

Coordinates: 44°10′58″N 10°22′46″E

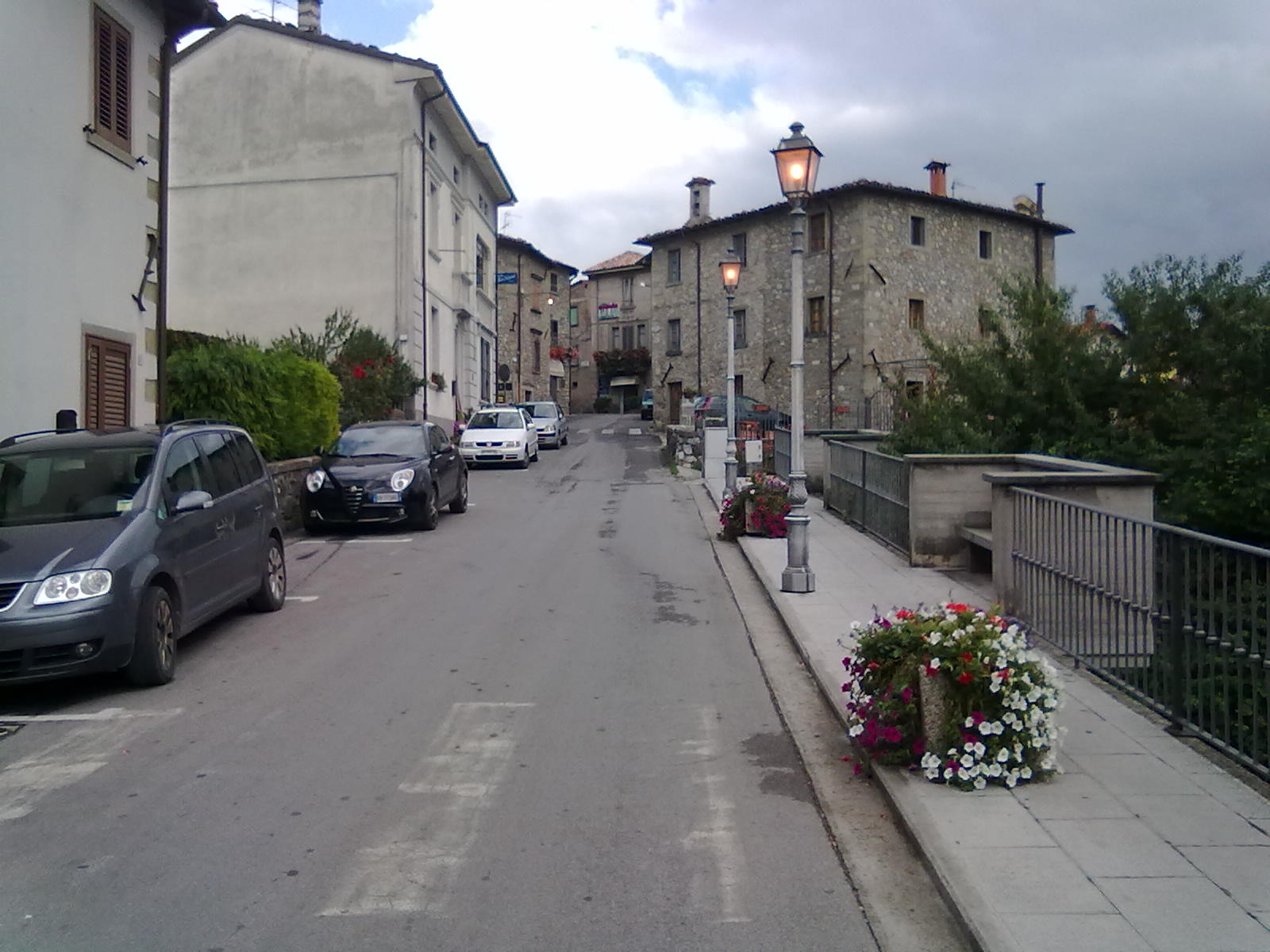

Corfino is a village (frazione) of Villa Collemandina in the Garfagnana, Tuscany, Italy.

== See also ==
- Church of San Lorenzo Martire, Corfino
- Orto Botanico "Pania di Corfino"
