= Anchiano, Borgo a Mozzano =

Anchiano
- Frazione
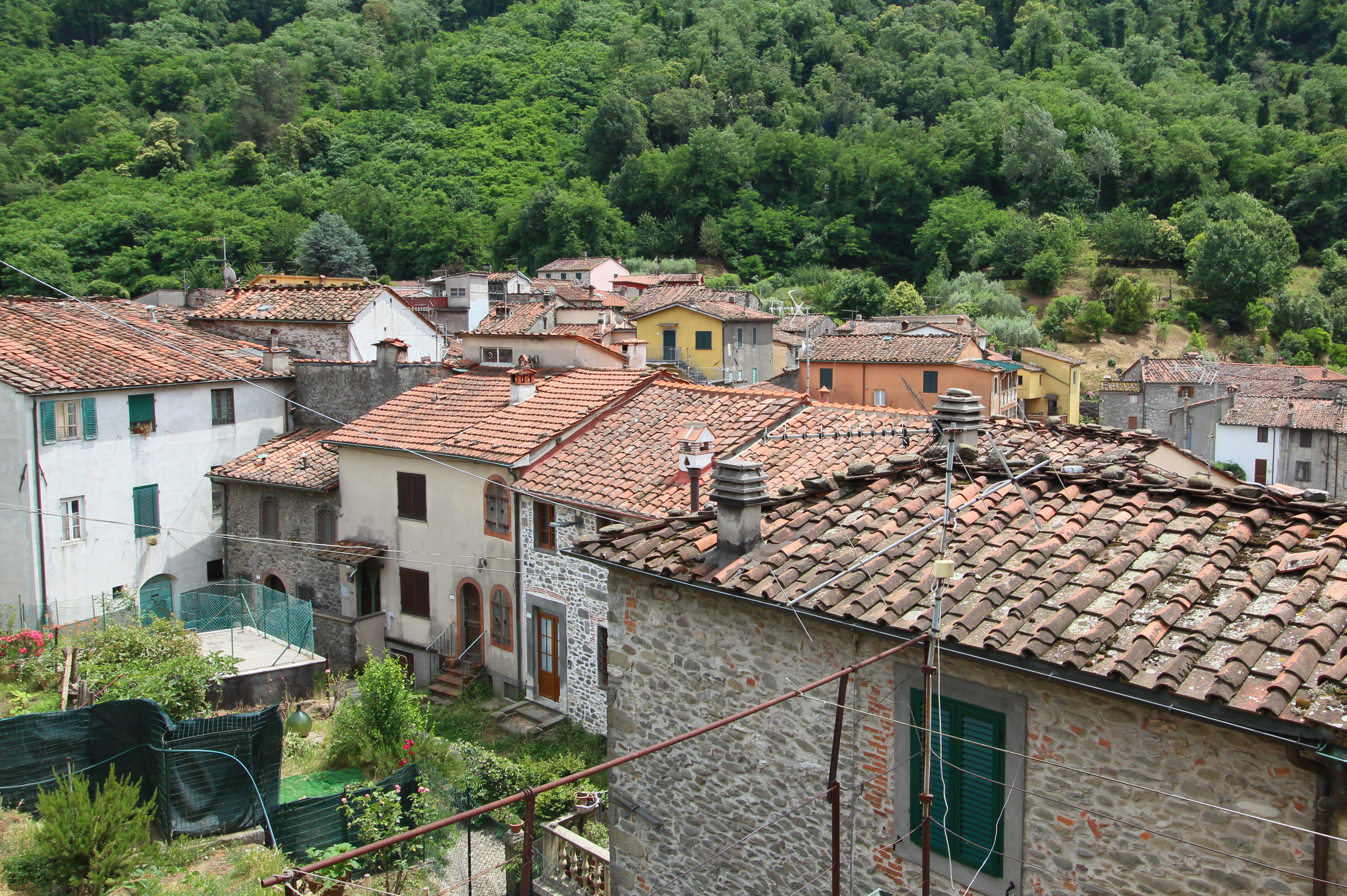
- View of Anchiano

- Location of Anchiano in Italy
- Coordinates: 43°58′9″N 10°31′56″E
- Country: Italy
- Region: Tuscany
- Province: Lucca (LU)
- Comune: Borgo a Mozzano
- Elevation: 86 m (282 ft)

Population (2011)
  - Total: 293
- Demonym: Anchianini
- Time zone: UTC+1 (CET)
  - Summer (DST): UTC+2 (CEST)
- Postal code: 55023
- Dialing code: (+39) 0583

Anchiano is a village in Tuscany, central Italy, administratively a frazione of the comune of Borgo a Mozzano, province of Lucca.

Rocca is about 18 km from Lucca and 3 km from Borgo a Mozzano.

== Monuments ==
- Church of San Pietro Apostolo
- Church of Santi Giusto e Clemente in Puticiano

== Bibliography ==
- Guastucci, Luigi (1987). Guida di Anchiano. Borgo a Mozzano: Il Ponte del Diavolo.
