= Lugliano =

- Frazione
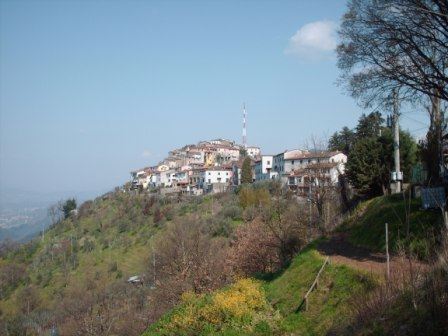

- Location of Lugliano in Italy
- Coordinates: 44°02′0″N 10°34′27″E
- Country: Italy
- Region: Tuscany
- Province: Lucca (LU)
- Comune: Bagni di Lucca
- Elevation: 417 m (1,368 ft)

Population (2007)
  - Total: 253
- Demonym: Luglianini
- Time zone: UTC+1 (CET)
  - Summer (DST): UTC+2 (CEST)
- Postal code: 55022
- Dialing code: 0583
- Patron saint: St. James
- Saint day: July 25

Lugliano is a small frazione (village) located in the municipality of Bagni di Lucca, in the Province of Lucca, Tuscany.

Located at about 400 meters above sea level, the village dominates the Serchio valley, the valley of the Lima stream, and the two valleys of the streams Buliesima and Pizzorne. Once a medieval fief of the Suffredinghi family, it was part of the Duchy of Lucca, then Tuscany.

== Monuments ==
- Church of San Jacopo
- Villa Politi
