= Giuliano di Simone =

Italian painter

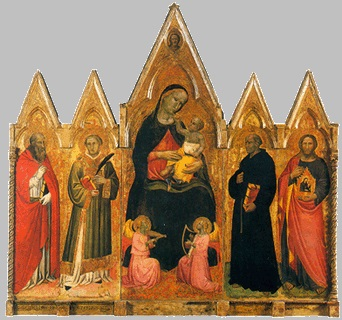
Enthroned Madonna and Child (c. 1389) Madonna and Child with Angels and Saints Augustine, Luke, Steven and Nicolas of Tolentino

Giuliano di Simone (late 14th century - early 15th century) was an Italian painter, active near Lucca and Pisa in a late Gothic-style. He worked in a style reminiscent of Spinello Aretino. Giuliano is known for only one signed work, an Enthroned Madonna and Child (1389) located in the church of San Michele in Castiglione di Garfagnana.
