= Vico Pancellorum =

- Frazione
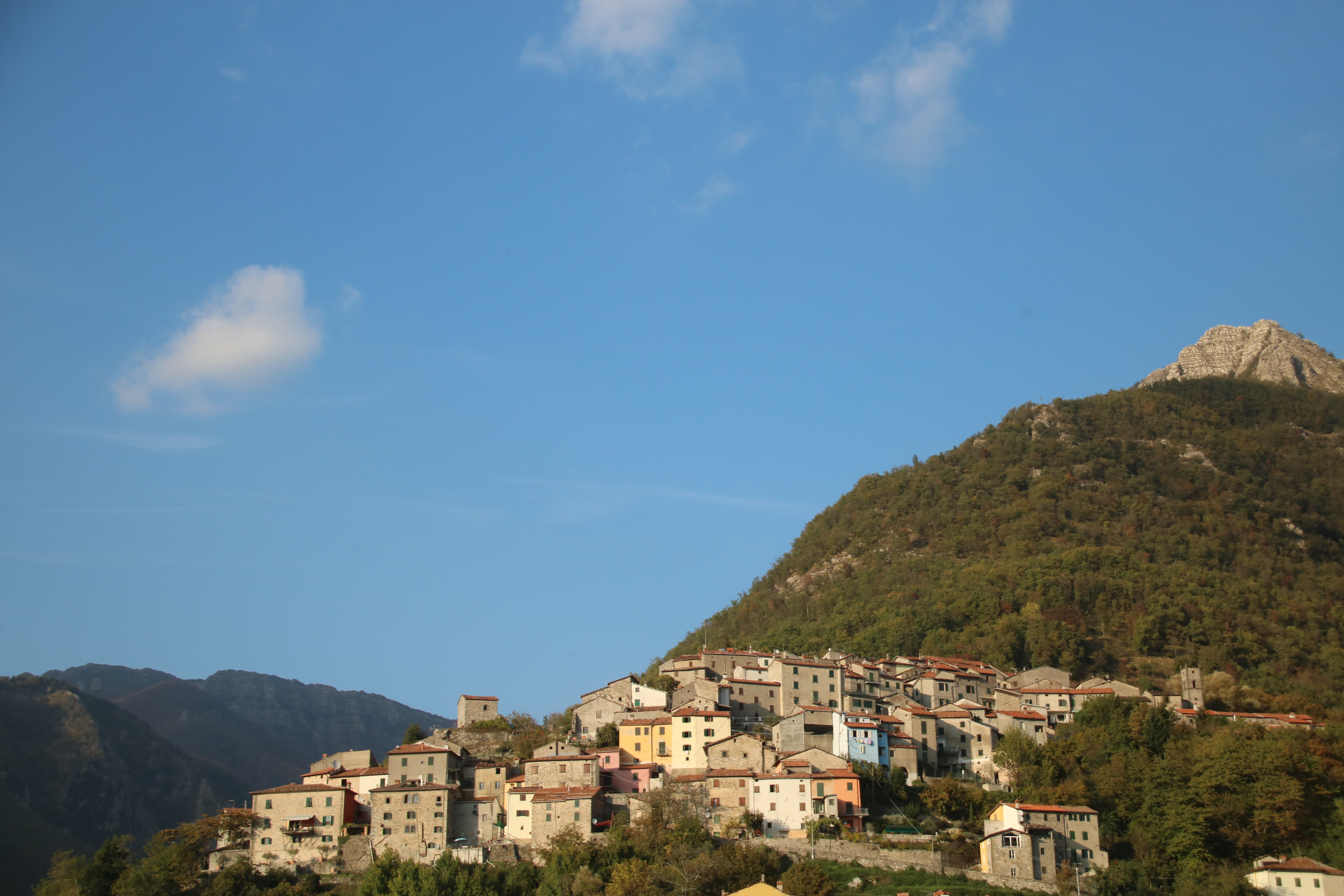
- View of Vico Pancellorum

- Location of Vico Pancellorum in Italy
- Coordinates: 44°3′17.49″N 10°41′55.56″E
- Country: Italy
- Region: Tuscany
- Province: Lucca
- Comune: Bagni di Lucca
- Elevation: 630 m (2,070 ft)

Population (2011)
  - Total: 108
- Time zone: UTC+1 (CET)
  - Summer (DST): UTC+2 (CEST)
- Dialing code: 0583

Vico Pancellorum is a village in Tuscany, administratively a frazione of the comune of Bagni di Lucca, in the Province of Lucca.

It lies at 630 meters above sea level at the foot of Balzo Nero (1300 meters above sea level).

Vico Pancellorum has two catholic churches from the medieval ages.
