= Pescaglia =

- Comune
- Comune di Pescaglia
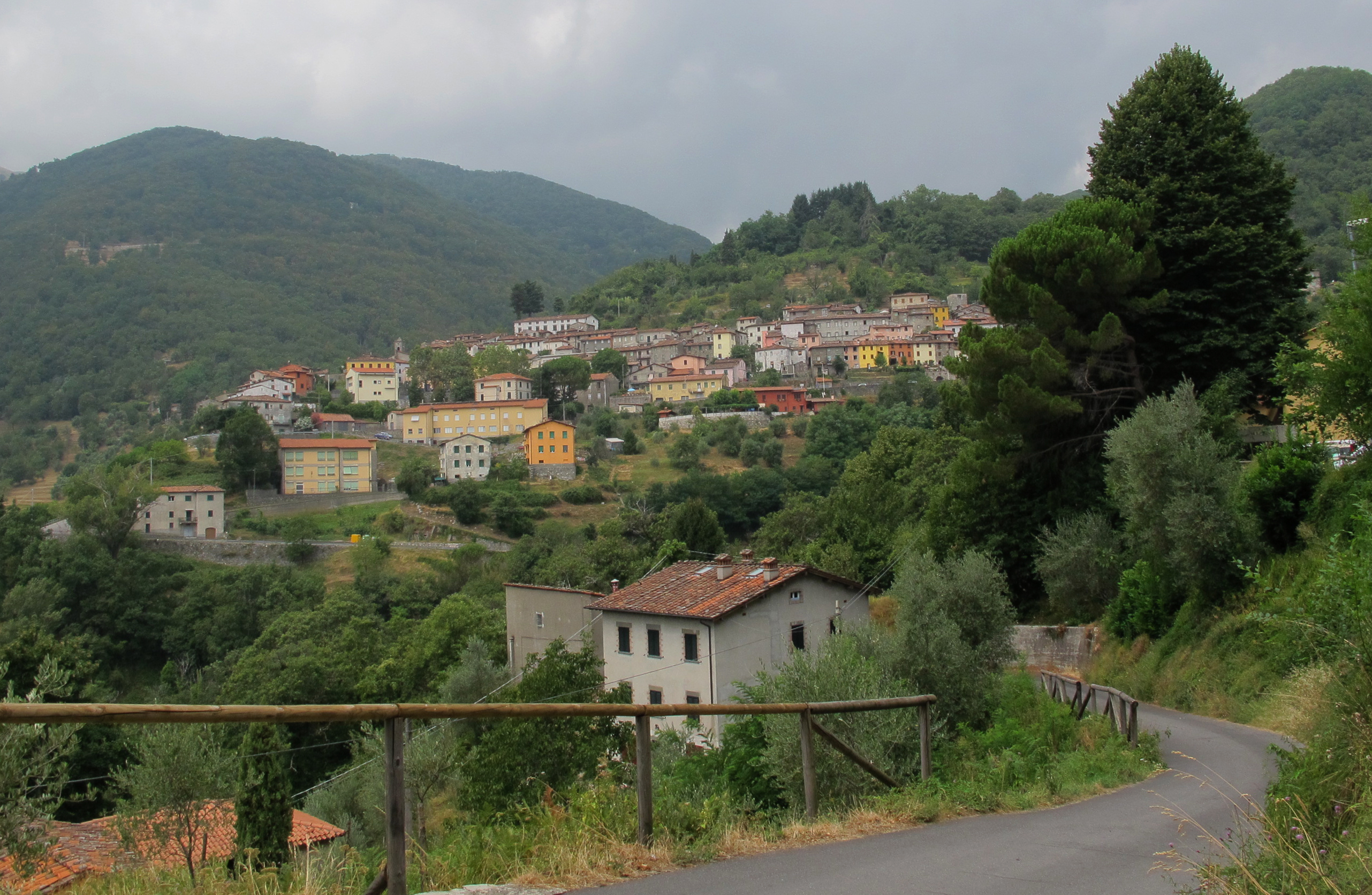
- Panorama of Pescaglia

- Coat of arms

- Location within Italy Location within Tuscany
- Coordinates: 43°58′N 10°25′E
- Country: Italy
- Region: Tuscany
- Province: Lucca (LU)
- Frazioni: Vetriano, Piegaio, San Rocco in Turrite, Pascoso, Convalle, Gello, Celle dei Puccini, Villa A Roggio, Colognora, Fiano, San Martino in Freddana, Monsagrati, Cerreto

Government
  - Mayor: Andrea Bonfanti

Area
  - Total: 70.4 km^{2} (27.2 sq mi)
- Elevation: 504 m (1,654 ft)

Population (31 March 2017)
  - Total: 3,486
  - Density: 49.5/km^{2} (128/sq mi)
- Demonym: Pescaglini
- Time zone: UTC+1 (CET)
  - Summer (DST): UTC+2 (CEST)
- Postal code: 55064
- Dialing code: 0583
- Website: Official website

Pescaglia (Italian pronunciation: [peˈskaʎʎa]) is a comune (municipality) in the Province of Lucca in the Italian region of Tuscany, located about 70 kilometres (43 mi) northwest of Florence and about 15 kilometres (9 mi) northwest of Lucca.

Pescaglia borders the following municipalities: Borgo a Mozzano, Camaiore, Fabbriche di Vallico, Lucca, Stazzema, Fabbriche di Vergemoli.

== History ==
The name Pescaglia is thought by some to derive from the Latin Pascualia, meaning pastureland, and by others from the verb pescare, meaning "to fish". Both relate to the abundant natural resources of the territory.

While mention of Piscalia or Pascualia exist from Roman times the first specific record of the town is thought to be in documents relative to the ownership of property by the church of San Pietro in Rome dated around the 9th century.

After this documents reveal that large parts of the comune were owned by the Rolandinghi of Lombard origin. These were succeeded by the Antelminellis during the period when Pisa dominated Lucca.

Recorded control of the town and territory was achieved by Lucca in 1272. Instruction to razeoriginal castle was recorded in the Statute of 1308 in order to weaken the local lords. It is questionable if this order was carried out, but in 1584, architect Vincenzo Civitali was instructed to rebuild the castle. Pescaglia remained within control of Lucca from that period to today growing in size and importance.

== Geography ==
Pescaglia, the town, is found in the geographical centre of the comune and valley of the Pedogna. It is broken into three distinct urban units, Castello del Poggio or simply il Poggio, Piazzanello and Villabuona. Batoni is a hamlet within the comune.

== Main sights ==
- Church of San Giovanni Battista
- Teatrino di Vetriano, Pescaglia

== Transport ==
Travel within the territory is by road. Each of the three valleys, the Pedogna, the Freddana and the Turrite are served by main roads along the bottom the valley that link to the SS12 which runs from Lucca to Modena. In recent years the improvements to key roads joining the valleys has greatly improved communication across the valleys.

== Sources ==
- Magi, Giovanni (1987). La Toscana paese per paese. Bonechi.
