= Canigiano, Lucca =

Coordinates: 44°10′37″N 10°23′00″E

Canigiano is a village within the Villa Collemandina commune in the Garfagnana area of Tuscany, Italy.

It is linked to the road network by the Ponte Attilio Vergai, which when it was built in 1933 was the highest bridge in Europe and an early use of reinforced concrete. It was named after the fascist era podesta of the area who built the bridge but later died helping the resistance.

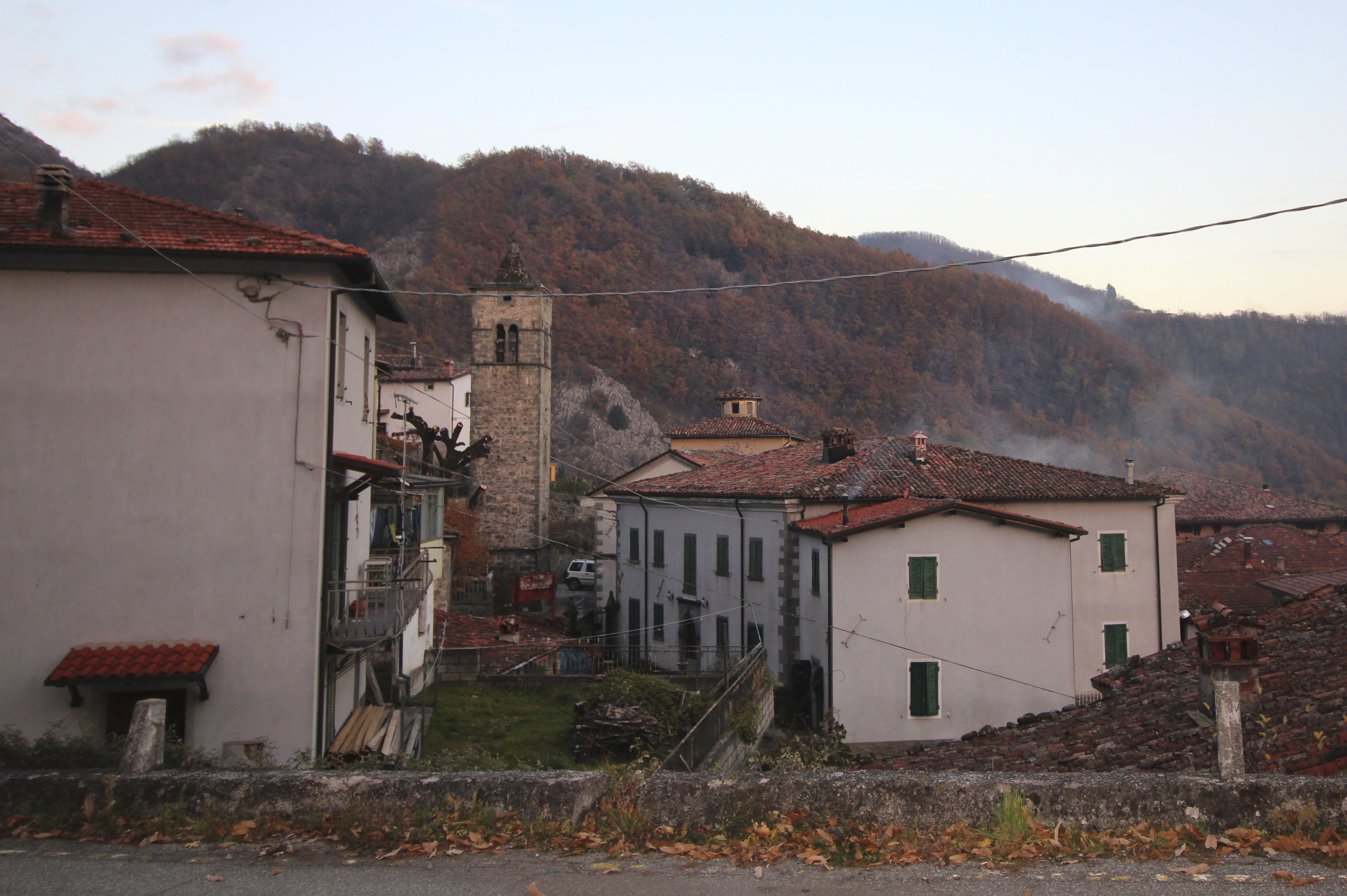
