= San Giovanni Battista, Pescaglia =

Church building in Pescaglia, Italy

Coordinates: 43.91822°N 10.41821°E

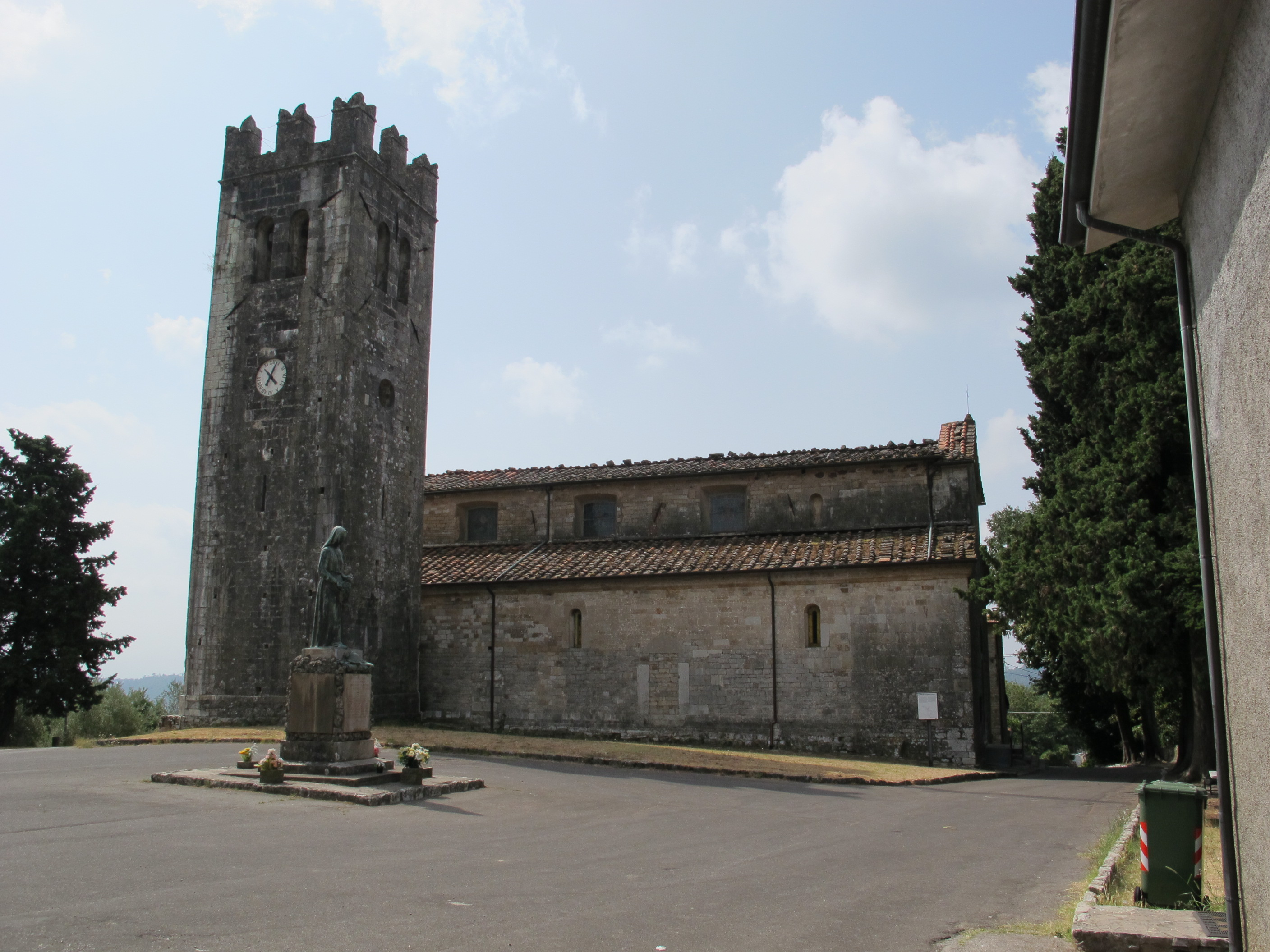
Pieve di san giovanni battista a monsagrati 01.JPG

The San Giovanni Battista is a Romanesque-style, Roman Catholic parish church, located in the Monsagrati neighborhood of the town of Pescaglia in the province of Lucca, Tuscany, Italy.

== History ==
The pieve, or rural parish church with baptismal font, arose outside of the town of Pescaglia, atop a hill overlooking Val Freddana. Originally a church in this neighborhood, dedicated to Santa Reparata, was known here by the Lombard era. In 989, it was dedicated also to St John the Baptist. Documents cite construction of the present church and bell-tower in 1102, with the abandonment of the prior church. The church has an undecorated stone exterior.

The tabernacle of the apse was built in the 15th century, when the church underwent restoration and decoration by Benedetto Nobili. Later refurbishments occurred in the 17th and 18th centuries, with windows opened in the nave. A clock was added to the belltower in the 19th century, and some of the roofline merlons were added.
