= Villa Collemandina =

- Comune
- Comune di Villa Collemandina
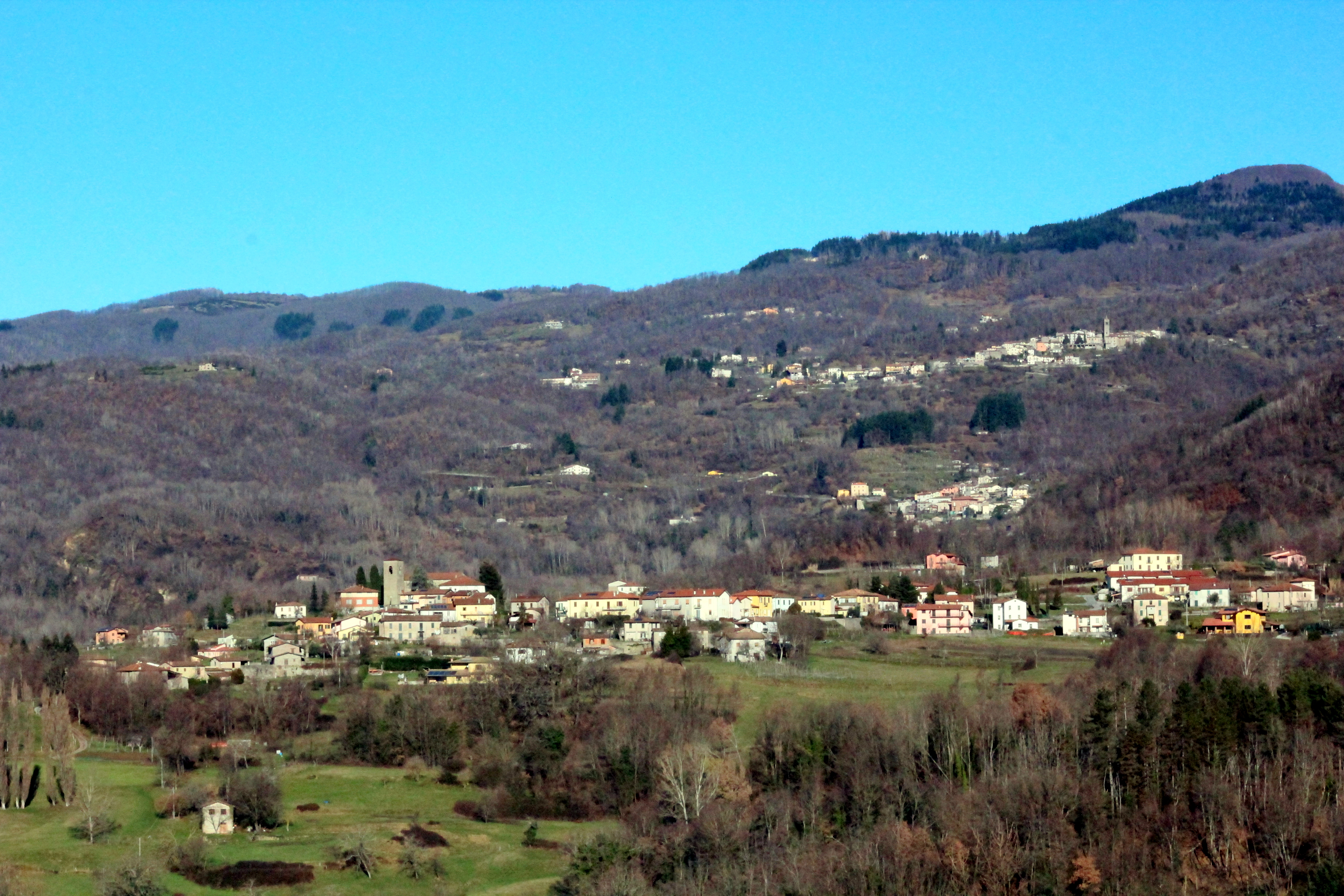
- Villa Collemandina

- Coat of arms

- Location within Italy Location within Tuscany
- Coordinates: 44°10′N 10°24′E
- Country: Italy
- Region: Tuscany
- Province: Lucca (LU)
- Frazioni: Canigiano, Corfino, Magnano, Massa Sassorosso, Pianacci, Sassorosso

Government
  - Mayor: Dorino Tamagnini

Area
  - Total: 34.79 km^{2} (13.43 sq mi)
- Elevation: 549 m (1,801 ft)

Population (31 March 2017)
  - Total: 1,318
  - Density: 37.88/km^{2} (98.12/sq mi)
- Demonym: Villesi
- Time zone: UTC+1 (CET)
  - Summer (DST): UTC+2 (CEST)
- Postal code: 55030
- Dialing code: 0583
- Website: Official website

Villa Collemandina is a comune (municipality) in the Province of Lucca in the Italian region Tuscany, located about 80 kilometres (50 mi) northwest of Florence and about 35 kilometres (22 mi) north of Lucca.

Villa Collemandina borders the following municipalities: Castiglione di Garfagnana, Pieve Fosciana, San Romano in Garfagnana, Sillano Giuncugnano, Villa Minozzo.

== Main sights ==
- Sanctuary of Santa Maria del Soccorso
- Orto Botanico "Pania di Corfino", a botanical garden
