= Garfagnana =

- historical and geographical region
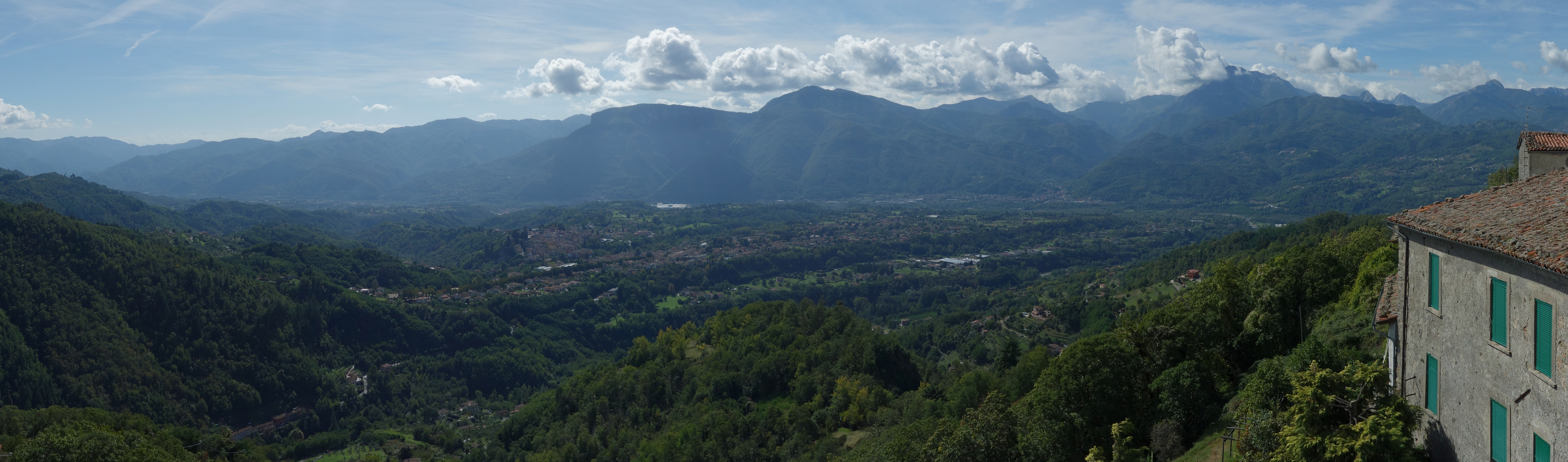
- Barga in the Serchio valley, with the Apuan Alps in the background

- Location within Tuscany
- Coordinates: 44.09°N 10.43°E
- Country: Italy
- Region: Tuscany
- Province: Lucca
- Comuni: Careggine; Camporgiano; Castiglione di Garfagnana; Fosciandora; Gallicano; Minucciano; Molazzana; Piazza al Serchio; Pieve Fosciana; San Romano in Garfagnana; Sillano Giuncugnano; Vagli Sotto; Vergemoli; Villa Collemandina

Area
  - Area: 620 km^{2} (240 sq mi)

The Garfagnana (Italian: [ɡarfaɲˈɲaːna]) is a historical and geographical region of central Italy, today part of the province of Lucca, in Tuscany. It is the upper valley or basin of the river Serchio, and thus lies between the main ridge of the Northern Apennines to the north-east and the Alpi Apuane to the west. The principal towns are Castelnuovo di Garfagnana and Barga.

== History ==
Garfagnana was historically inhabited by Ligurian (Apuani and Friniati) and Etruscan populations. The area was conquered by the Romans in 180 BC. After the fall of the Carolingian Empire in 888 it came under the control of various feudal lords, and was later caught up in the rivalry between the Guelphs and the Ghibellines. In 1248 the Holy Roman Emperor Frederick II ceded it to the Republic of Lucca. In the fifteenth century much of the territory came under the control of the d'Este family of Ferrara, being absorbed into the Duchy of Modena. With the unification of Italy, the Garfagnana became part of the province of Massa e Carrara, and in 1923 passed to that of Lucca.

== Geography ==
The Garfagnana is almost entirely mountainous. It has heavy rainfall, and much of it is densely wooded, often with sweet chestnut, Castanea sativa. Chestnuts were until recently an important food source; the Farina di Neccio della Garfagnana, a chestnut flour, has DOP status. The farro of the region, Farro della Garfagnana, has Indicazione Geografica Protetta status; the area is also known for its lentils and for its porcini mushrooms. It is the area of origin of the Garfagnina breed of cattle, of the Garfagnina breed of goat, and of the Garfagnina Bianca sheep breed.

The capital of the region is Castelnuovo di Garfagnana.

The Garfagnana and Lunigiana were struck by a powerful earthquake on 7 September 1920. The worst damage and largest number of deaths were at Villa Collemandina; the greatest intensity was recorded there and at Fivizzano.

== Bibliography ==
- Giulio Ciampoltrini, Ricerche sugli insediamenti liguri dell’alta valle del Serchio, in “Bollettino di Archeologia”, 19-20-21, 1993, pp. 39–70. (Italian)
- Giulio Ciampoltrini, L’insediamento etrusco nella valle del Serchio fra IV e III sec. a.C. Considerazioni sull’abitato di Ponte Gini di Orentano, in “Studi Etruschi”, LXII, 1996, pp. 173–210.
- Giulio Ciampoltrini, Gli Etruschi della Garfagnana. Ricerche nell'insediamento della Murella a Castelnuovo di Garfagnana, Polistampa Firenze 2005 (Italian)
- Giulio Ciampoltrini, Paolo Notini, Silvio Fioravanti, Consuelo Spataro, Gli Etruschi e il Serchio, I Segni dell'Auser, Bientina 2012, pp. 80 (Italian)
