= Garfagnina goat =

Italian breed of goat

Garfagnina
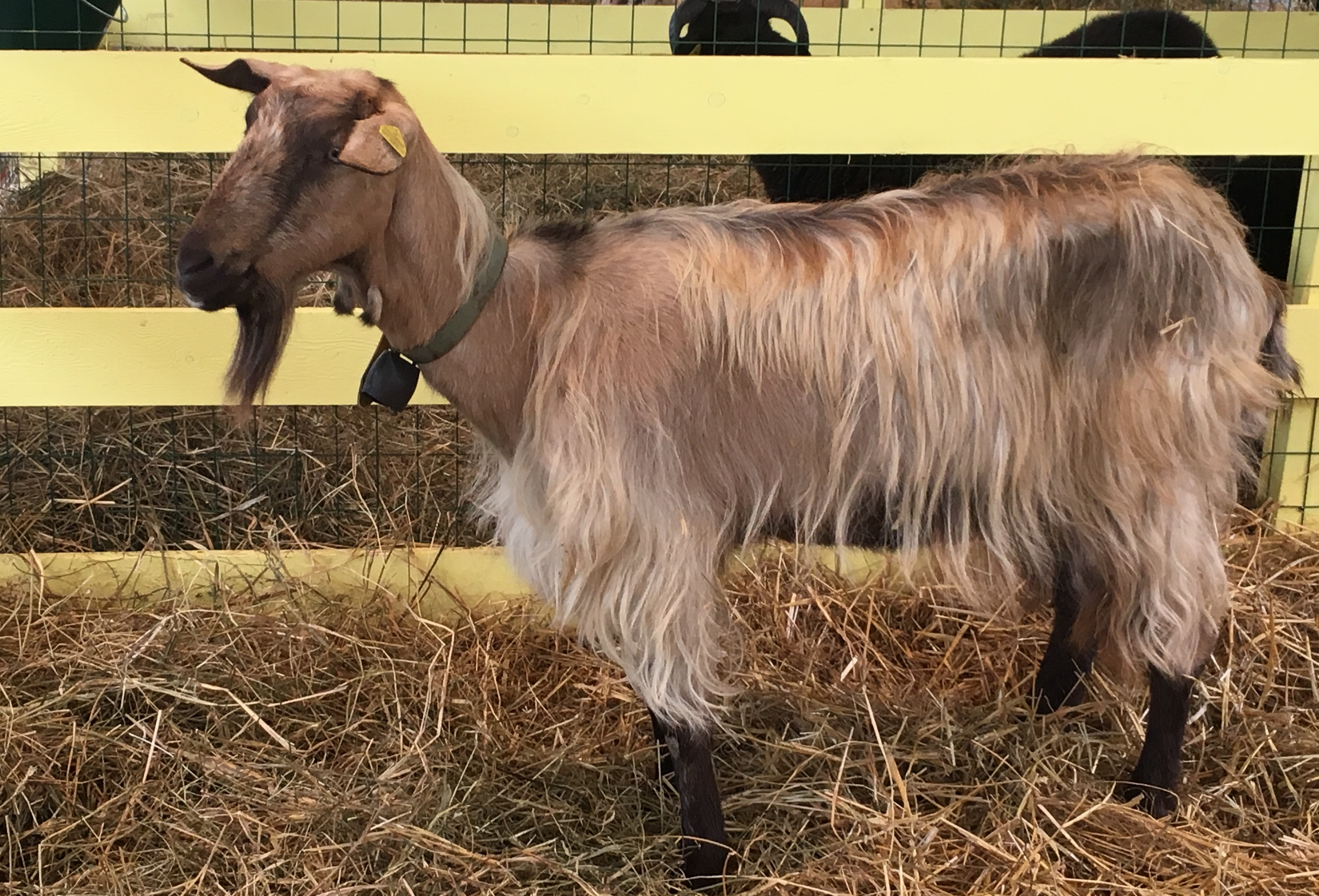
- Conservation status: FAO (2007): not listed; DAD-IS (2025): at risk/endangered
- Other names: Garfagnana; Garfagnina Bianca; Capra della Media Valle del Serchio; Capra della Controneria; Controneria
- Country of origin: Italy
- Distribution: province of Lucca
- Standard: MIPAAF
- Use: milk and meat

Traits
- Weight: Male: 70 kg; Female: 47 kg
- Height: Male: 83 cm; Female: 75 cm
- Coat: variable
- Horn status: sometimes horned
- Beard: bearded
- Goat; Capra aegagrus hircus

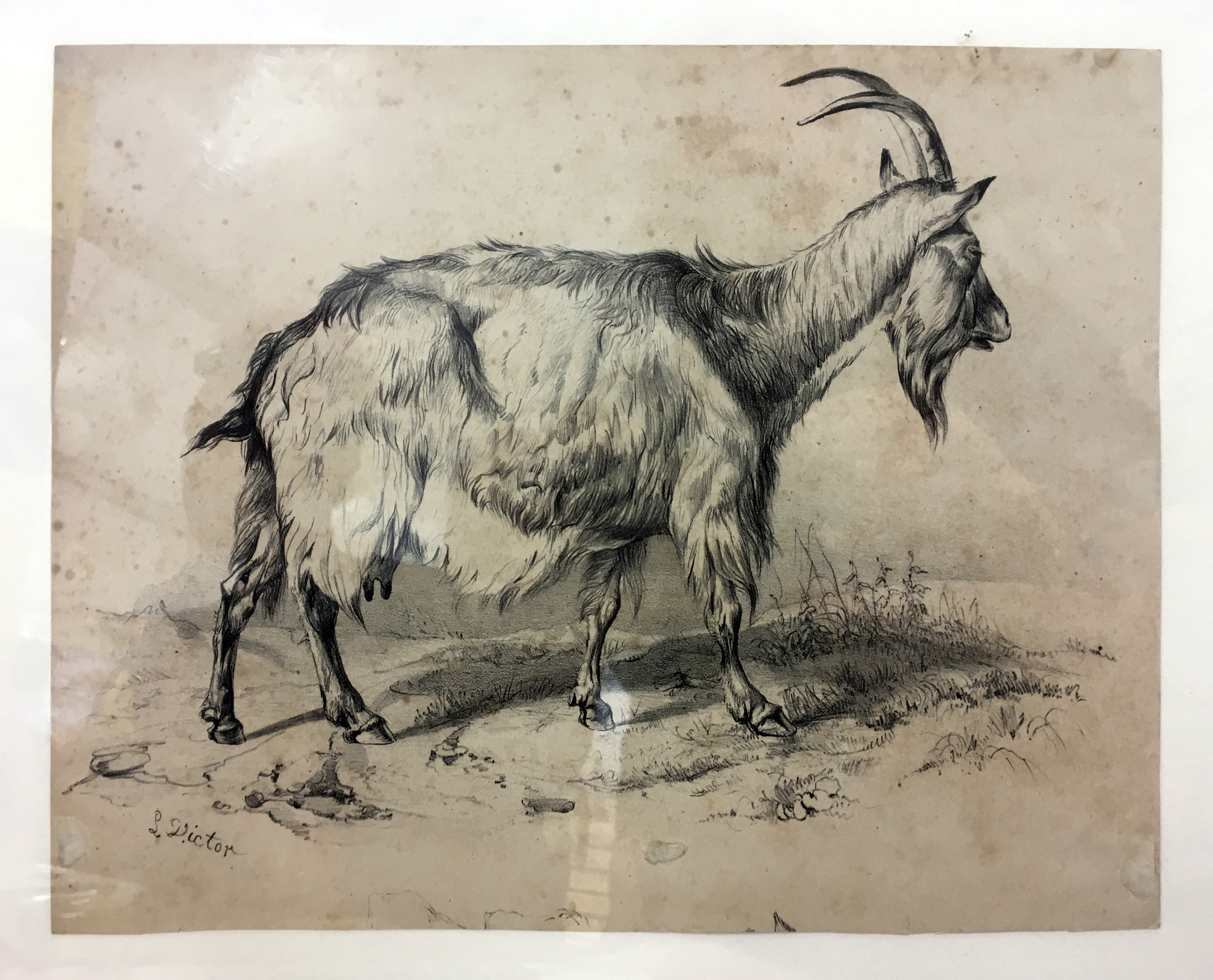
Nineteenth-century engraving by L. Victor

The Garfagnina or Garfagnana is an Italian breed of domestic goat from the mountainous Garfagnana area north of Lucca, in Tuscany in central Italy, from which it takes its name. It is raised in that area, in the comuni of Camporgiano, Careggine, Castelnuovo di Garfagnana, Fosciandora, Minucciano, Pieve Fosciana, Vergemoli and Villa Collemandina; in the comuni of Bagni di Lucca, Barga, Coreglia Antelminelli and Fabbriche di Vallico in the Media Valle del Serchio; and the historic area of the Controneria, to the north-east of Bagni di Lucca. It may also be known as the Capra della Media Valle del Serchio or as the Capra della Controneria. It is probably the last remnant of the Apennine type of goat of Emilia, Liguria and Tuscany.

The Garfagnina is one of the forty-three autochthonous Italian goat breeds of limited distribution for which a herd-book is kept by the Associazione Nazionale della Pastorizia, the Italian national association of sheep- and goat-breeders. The breed was in the past much more numerous; the estimated total population fell from about 5000 to 2500 between 1989 and 2006. At the end of 2013 the number registered was 354; for 2023 a total pollution of 441 head was reported, including 365 breeding nannies and 33 active billies.

== Use ==
The average milk yield of the Garfagnina is 215 litres in 195 days. The milk averages 3.97% milk-fat and 3.32% milk protein.

Kids are slaughtered at about 40 days, when they weigh some 11 kg.
