= Garfagnina (disambiguation) =

Garfagnina may refer to:

- The Garfagnina breed of cattle, from the Garfagnana, in Tuscany, Italy
- The Garfagnina Bianca breed of sheep, from the Garfagnana, in Tuscany, Italy
- The Garfagnina (goat) breed of goat, from the Garfagnana, in Tuscany, Italy
