= Ermete Pierotti =

Italian Biblical scholar and architect (1820-1888)

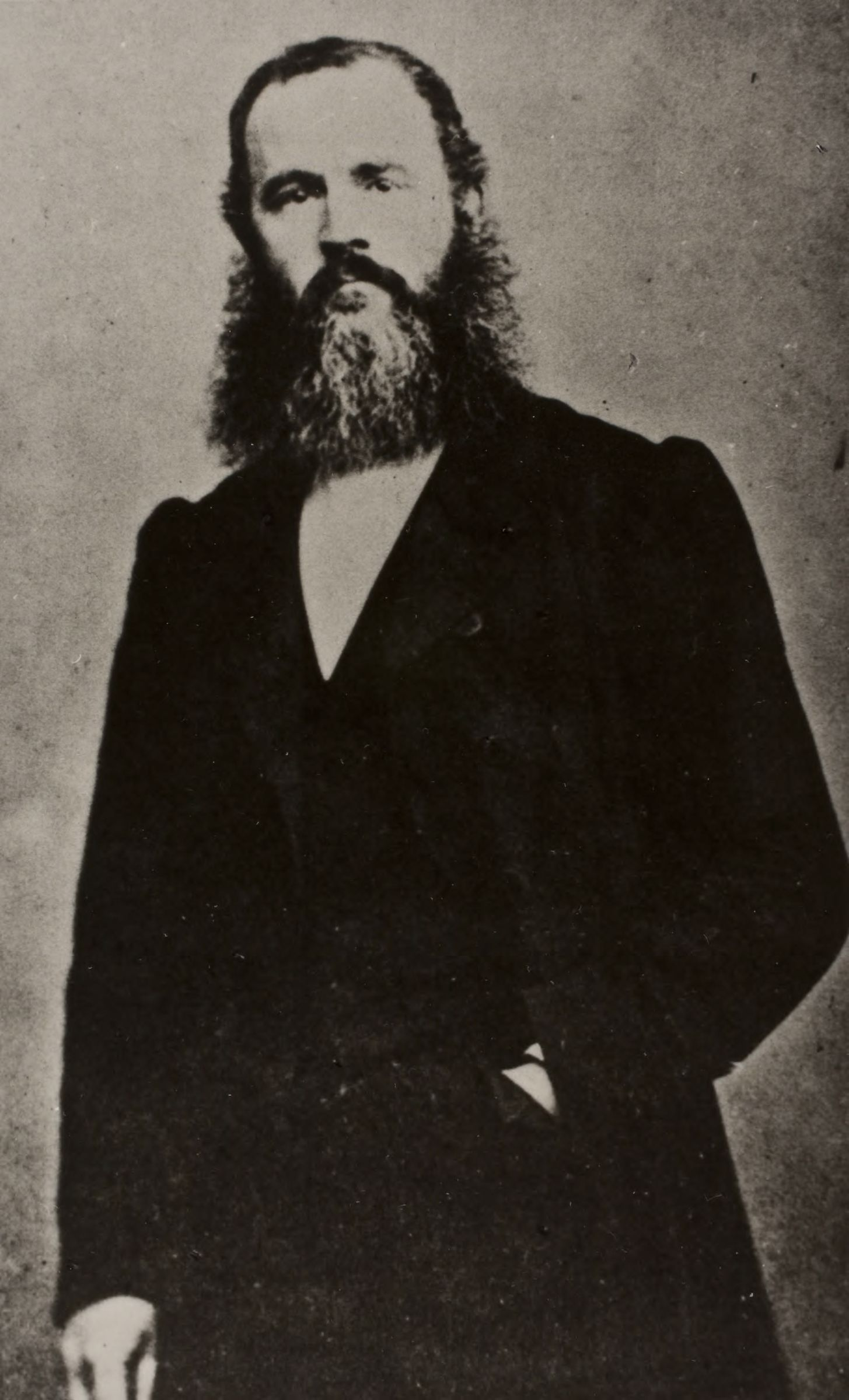
- Born: 1820; Pieve Fosciana, Italy
- Died: 1888 (aged 67–68)

Ermete Pierotti (born July 10, 1820, in Pieve Fosciana, † 1888) was an Italian engineer and archaeologist from Modena in Italy who lived in the mid-19th century. He served as a captain in the Corps of Royal Piedmontese army engineers, in the army of the Kingdom of Sardinia, and was chosen by Surraya Pasha in Jerusalem to serve as an architectural consultant, surveyor and archaeologist. He served in this capacity in the city of Jerusalem between 1854 and 1861. He is the author of several works, most notably his monumental book which describes the topographical and historical features of Jerusalem, entitled, Jerusalem Explored (published in 1864), as well as of another work describing the customs of its people.

== Background ==
Pierotti was the eldest of nine children. His family records date back to the 16th century. They owned a house and a chapel in the Pontardeto district of the municipality of Pieve Fosciana, where the family members were buried. In the 19th century, the family built the Palazzo Pierotti in the center of Pieve Fosciana on Piazza Roma. As of 2022, it still served as the town hall of the municipality.

Pierotti worked as a military engineer in Genoa and served as captain of the 4th Company in the Engineering Corps of the Sardinian Kingdom (Italian: Capitano nelle quarta Compagnie del Corpo reale del Genio Militare).

After being discharged from the army, Pierotti went to the Levant, Jerusalem and Egypt for 15 years. He earned his living as an engineer.

From late 1849 to early 1850, Pierotti was in Constantinople and Troy, where he studied ancient monuments. During this time, he visited Athens, Sparta, Corinth, Acrocorinth, Mantineia, Eleusis, Megara, Mycenae, Messina, Argos, Marathon, Chaeronea, Paros and Aegina. At the end of 1850 and the beginning of 1851 he visited the Ionian Islands. From 1851 to 1854 Pierotti worked on various buildings in Egypt. While laying foundations for a Greek church in Alexandria, he discovered the foundations of the Library of Alexandria.

== Life and career ==
In 1854, Pierotti arrived in Jerusalem after being selected by the Pasha to serve as a consultant for the renovation work on the Temple Mount, and was put in charge of repairing the city's water system. In addition, he took part, as an engineer, in various construction projects that were being carried out in the city at that time, such as the Austrian Pilgrim Hospice near Via Dolorosa; the inspection of the house that was being carried out at the Church of Santa Anna; the construction of the Convent of the Sisters of Zion; and the construction of buildings to serve Russian pilgrims. Surraya Pasha, the Ottoman governor of Jerusalem, appointed him as the engineer of the city of Jerusalem. In his role of handling the city's water system, it opened up places to him that were closed to Western researchers, especially those of the Temple Mount and its mosques, where he was also able to take photographs for the first time, with the help of the photographer Mendel Diness.

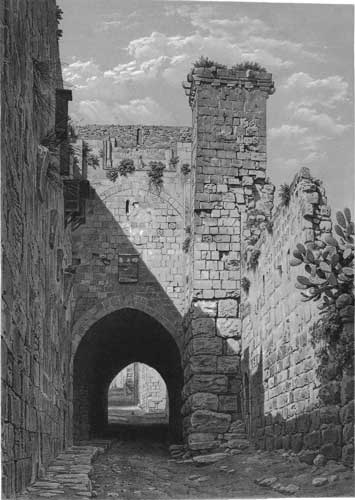
Stone masonry of Jerusalem

In 1856, he helped the Turkish engineer Assad Effendi to restore the city's main aqueduct, the Qanat es-Sabil. During this work, he reached the Temple Mount, where there were canals and cisterns that belonged to the Qanat es-Sabil. One of the buildings Pierotti was involved in building, and therefore also in the excavations of the site for construction purposes, is the Convent of the Sisters of Zion. At this site was the arch known by its newly applied name, Ecce Homo. Excavation of the area revealed additional parts of the structure, and it turned out that it was a gate with three arches, which was quite well preserved. Despite the Christian religious tradition associated with this place, Pierotti correctly determined that the gate is from the Roman period, much later than the event in the history of Christianity to which it is attributed. Pierotti also carried out archaeological excavations at the 'Rock Scarp of Mt. Zion'. He is one of the first to make known the remnants of Second Temple period walls beneath the foundations of newly built structures in the Christian Quarter of Jerusalem. In 1859, Pierotti was in charge of repairing the road from Jaffa to Jerusalem. During Pierotti's eight-year tenure in the country, he visited the Cave of the Patriarchs in Hebron and made a detailed layout and map of the place.

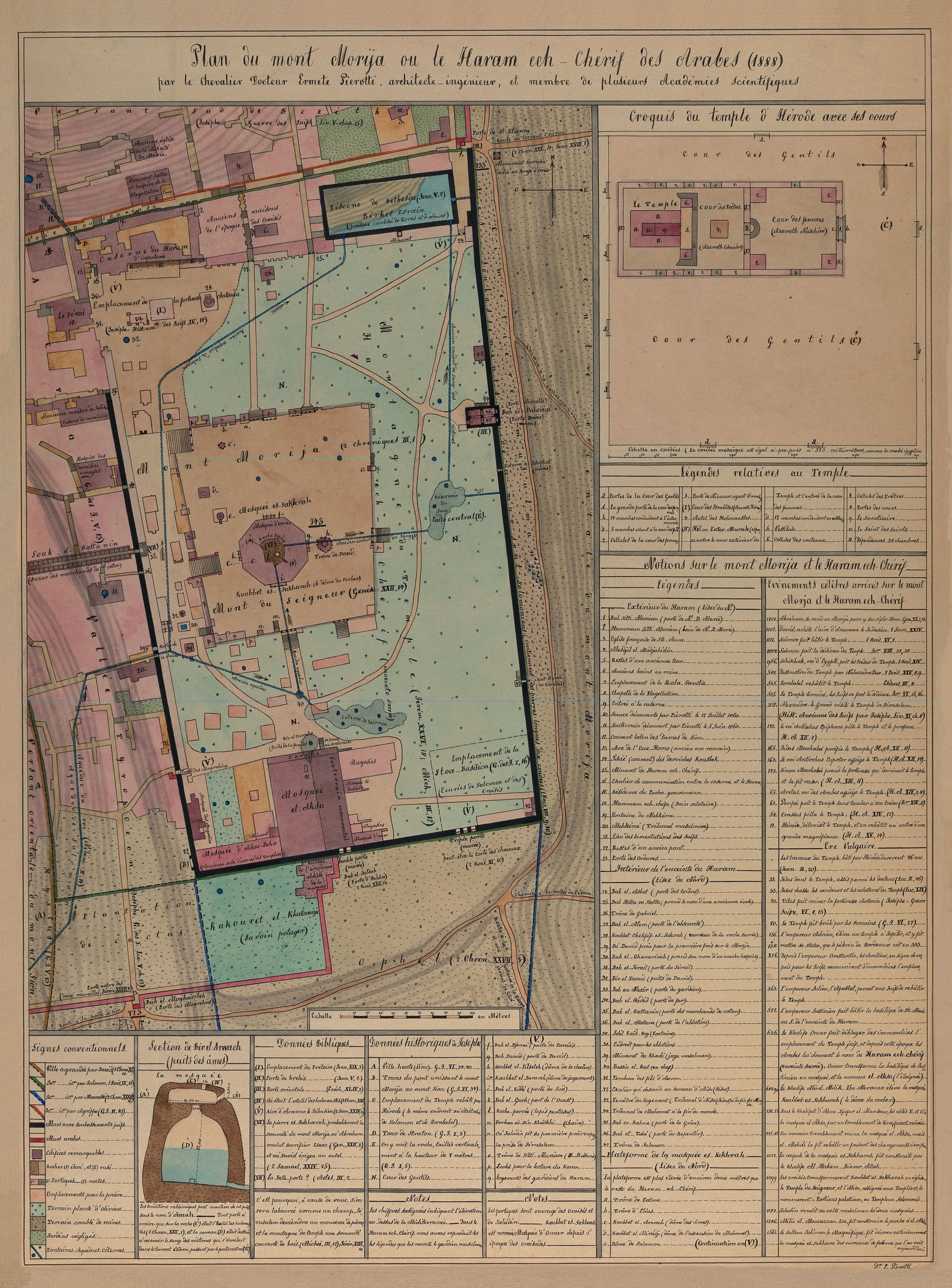
Plan of Mount Moriah, or what is called the Temple Mount (click to enlarge)

The task of repairing the water system of the Haram ash-Sharif enabled him to conduct a thorough examination of its ancient remains, and he was even allowed by the pasha to bring a local photographer with him into the sacred enclosure to take the first detailed photographs ever made of the Dome of the Rock and the al-Aqsa mosque.

Pierotti attempted to identify Second Temple period sites described by Josephus, and built upon Ernst Gustav Schultz's and Barclay's research and expanded it. After several years of intense research in Jerusalem, Pierotti became involved in a dispute between George Williams and James Ferguson, the latter of whom supported by George Grove (of the Palestine Exploration Fund), regarding the correct location of the Church of the Holy Sepulchre.

In his book, Customs and Traditions of Palestine, Pierotti compares the customs of the "ancient Hebrews" and the Jews of the Land of Israel during the Second Temple and Talmud periods, with the customs of the Arab residents of the land during his time, while trying to find many similarities between them.

After Pierotti left the Holy Land, he went to Paris, and from there to London in 1863. Between 1868 and 1880 he was seen in Switzerland. He died in 1888.

== Selected published works ==
- Pierotti, Ermete (1864), Jerusalem explored: being a description of the ancient and modern city, with numerous illustrations consisting of views, ground plans, and sections, translated by T.G. Bonney, London: Bell and Daldy; Cambridge: Deighton, Bell and Co., OCLC 1472902357 (Note: Originally published in French, it was dedicated to the then French Emperor, Napoleon III. It was translated into English in London and began to circulate showing, in volume 2, many splendid lithographic photos of the sites and detailed maps of places like the Temple Mount.)
- Pierotti, Ermete (1864b), Customs and traditions of Palestine: illustrating the manners of the ancient Hebrew, Translated by T.G. Bonney, Cambridge, OCLC 1253816803
- Pierotti, Ermete (1865), La Palestine actuelle, dans ses rapports avec la Palestine ancienne, Paris, J. Rothschild (ed), OCLC 717884
- Pierotti, Ermete (1869), Macpéla, ou, Tombeau des patriarches à Hébron, Lausanne: Impr. Howard et Delisle, OCLC 1402890876 (in French)
- Pierotti, Ermete (1869b), Topographie ancienne et moderne de Jérusalem, Lausanne: Howard et Delisle, OCLC 77392725 (in French)
- Pierotti, Ermete (1870), Le Mont Morija depuis Abraham jusqu'à nos jours, Lausanne: Howard et Delisle, OCLC 715626863 (in French)

== Bibliography ==
- Halabi, Awad (2018). "The Transformation of the Prophet Moses Festival in Late Ottoman Jerusalem (1850-1917): From Traditional Pilgrimage to Civil Ritual". Journal of Ritual Studies. 32 (2): 1–15. JSTOR 45217795.
- Lurie, Benzion (1971). "The Walls of Jerusalem at the End of the Second Temple Period (חומות ירושלים)". Eretz-Israel: Archaeological, Historical and Geographical Studies (in Hebrew). 10: 160–168. JSTOR 23619392.
- Lurie, Benzion (1988). "Notes on research methods (הערות על דרכי המחקר)". Beit Mikra: Journal for the Study of the Bible and Its World (in Hebrew). 33 (3): 383–391. JSTOR 23505031.
- Pierotti, Ermete (1864). Jerusalem explored: being a description of the ancient and modern city, with numerous illustrations consisting of views, ground plans, and sections. Vol. 1. Translated by T.G. Bonney. London: Bell and Daldy. OCLC 1472902357.
- Pierotti, Ermete (1864b). Customs and traditions of Palestine: illustrating the manners of the ancient Hebrew. Translated by T.G. Bonney. Cambridge: Deighton, Bell, & Co. OCLC 1253816803.
- Pierotti, Ermete (1869). Macpéla, ou, Tombeau des patriarches à Hébron (in French). Lausanne: Impr. Howard et Delisle. OCLC 1402890876.
- Re’em, Amit (2022). "A Herodian-Period Staircase on Mount Zion, Jerusalem, and a Reevaluation of the Remains from Bishop Gobat School". 'Atiqot. 106: 89–128. JSTOR 27113757.
- Silberman, Neil Asher (1982). Digging for God and Country: exploration, archeology, and the secret struggle for the Holy Land, 1799–1917. New York: Doubleday. OCLC 1244598445.
- Vakh, Kirill A. (2014). "Ermete Pierotti in the Russian Service: New Biographical Discoveries". Zeitschrift des Deutschen Palästina-Vereins. 130 (2): 194–204. JSTOR 43664933.
