= Santa Maria Assunta, Borsigliana =

Church in Borsigliana, Italy

Coordinates: 44°12′43.03″N 10°18′32.44″E

Santa Maria Assunta is a 12th-century Roman Catholic church building in the frazione of Borsigliana in the town limits of Piazza al Serchio, province of Lucca, region of Tuscany, Italy.

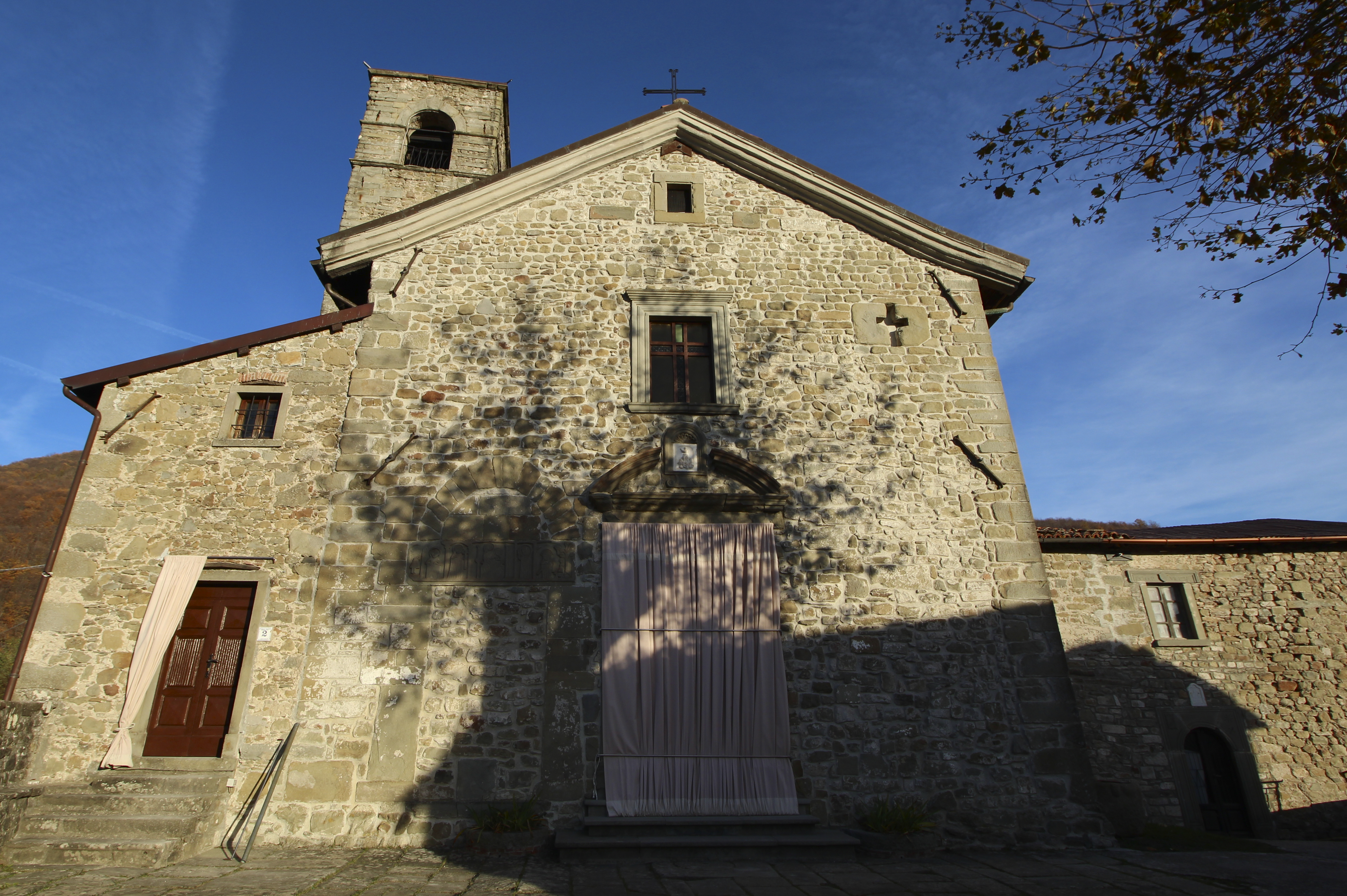

== History ==
The church was initially documented by 1020, but refurbished along the centuries, including a major reconstruction in the 18th century. Some of the walls are from the original church. The bas relief, depicting a Madonna and Child with saints and a donor, on the lunette of façade portal dates from the 15th century. Inside the church has a late 15th-century triptych depicting the Madonna and Child with Saints, set into an elaborate Gothic or Byzantine frame, attributed to the Maestro di Borsigliana, now known as Pietro da Talada.
