= St. Catherine Band Club =

Band in Zurrieq, Malta

The St. Catherine Band Club, or Socjeta Muzikali Santa Katarina, is one of the two bands in Zurrieq, Malta. In 1864 the band was created from an orchestra known in Italian as La Filarmonica del Zurrico. In 1944 the bandmaster was Espedito Deguara, a well known musician in Malta.

The band has played concerts abroad in the following places:

- Noto, Sicily, Italy (1954)
- Acireale, Sicily (1955)
- Catania, Sicily (1959)
- Bari, Apulia, Italy (1997)
- Lucca, Tuscany, Italy (2004) - Band twinning with "La Filarmonica P Mascagni" of Camporgiano
- Budapest, Hungary (2009)
- Black Forest, Germany (2014) - Band twinning with "The Upper Rhine Youth Symphonic Wind Band (VERBANDSJUGENDORCHESTER HOCHRHEIN)" of Black Forest
- Schlamding, Austria (2018)

In 1986 the band came under the direction of Francis Falzon, who was the bandmaster until his death on 26 October 2009. In the same year the St. Catherine Fireworks Factory was established.

In the first week of September 2005, the band celebrated the 1,700th anniversary of the martyrdom of St Catherine, the patron saint of Zurrieq. For this occasion a new store and pedestal were inaugurated.

The Feast of St Catherine is celebrated every year in the first week of September and lasts the whole week. It is considered one of the best festivals in the Maltese Islands, especially when it comes to outdoor celebrations such as the traditional marches and the decorations which dominate Zurrieq throughout the whole week.

The band Socjeta Muzikali Santa Katarina is popular both in Malta and overseas, especially in Italy. It was invited five times to different regions of Italy. This band club is at present the 3rd largest (feast) band in Malta, with more than 80 residential musicians. In 2006 the band had 33 students learning to become band musicians known as "allevi".

== Feast Program for 2007 ==
Sunday 26 August- Start of Titular Feast. St. Catherine Band makes a short march to mark the beginning of the feast.

Monday 27 August- St. Mary Band Club of Qrendi makes a march through the streets of the village, which finishes with a "Grand Final" in Republic Square.

Tuesday 28 August- Citizen Band of Sliema makes a march through the streets of the village, which finishes with a "Grand Final" in Republic Square. The "Sezzjoni Zghazagh Palmisti" inaugurate their 15-year service to the society with a mechanized surprise which add's to the village decorations.

Wednesday 29 August- "L-ewwel Jum tat-Tridu" Beland band of Zejtun makes a march through the streets of Zurrieq, finishing with another yet larger "Grand Final" in Republic Square.

Thursday 30 August- "It-Tieni Jum tat-Tridu" St Catherine Band Club of Zurrieq makes a musical concert on the magnificent "plancier", which by far is a unique spectacle. This concert is accompanied by a synchronized fireworks display which has become known throughout Malta. The fireworks are made by Saint Catherine Fireworks Factory which falls under the musical society.

Friday 31 August- "L-ahhar Jum tat-Tridu" St Catherine Band Club makes a march through the streets of Zurrieq accompanied by a statue of St Catherine. This is considered as the largest march of the feast, followed by many enthusiasts. The statue is later put on a pedestal in the village square accompanied by the march, fireworks and the traditional Hymn.

Saturday 1 August- Eve of feast Day. St Catherine Band Club starts a march at 10am which end with the traditional "Te Deum" march at around 3pm in republic square. It's worth nothing that this feast is one of the few in Malta which celebrate the "Te Deum" march on Saturday. Many Feast have it on Sunday. St Catherine Band Club do this to give Sunday a more liturgical aspect. In the evening a notable aerial and ground fireworks display is conducted. Bands from other villages are also invited.

Sunday 2 August- Feast Day. In the morning St Catherine Band Club makes a short march to the Parish Church. In the evening the procession with the magnificent statue of Saint Catherine is done. Fireworks also accompany the procession. At the end a worth watching traditional pyrotechnic display is performed by the Fireworks Factory known as "Kaxxa Nfernali Spanjola". Zurrieq is known by many for this long display which can take up to half an hour of constant fireworks lighting the skies. This marks the end of the feast, for that year.
