= Giuncugnano =

- Frazione
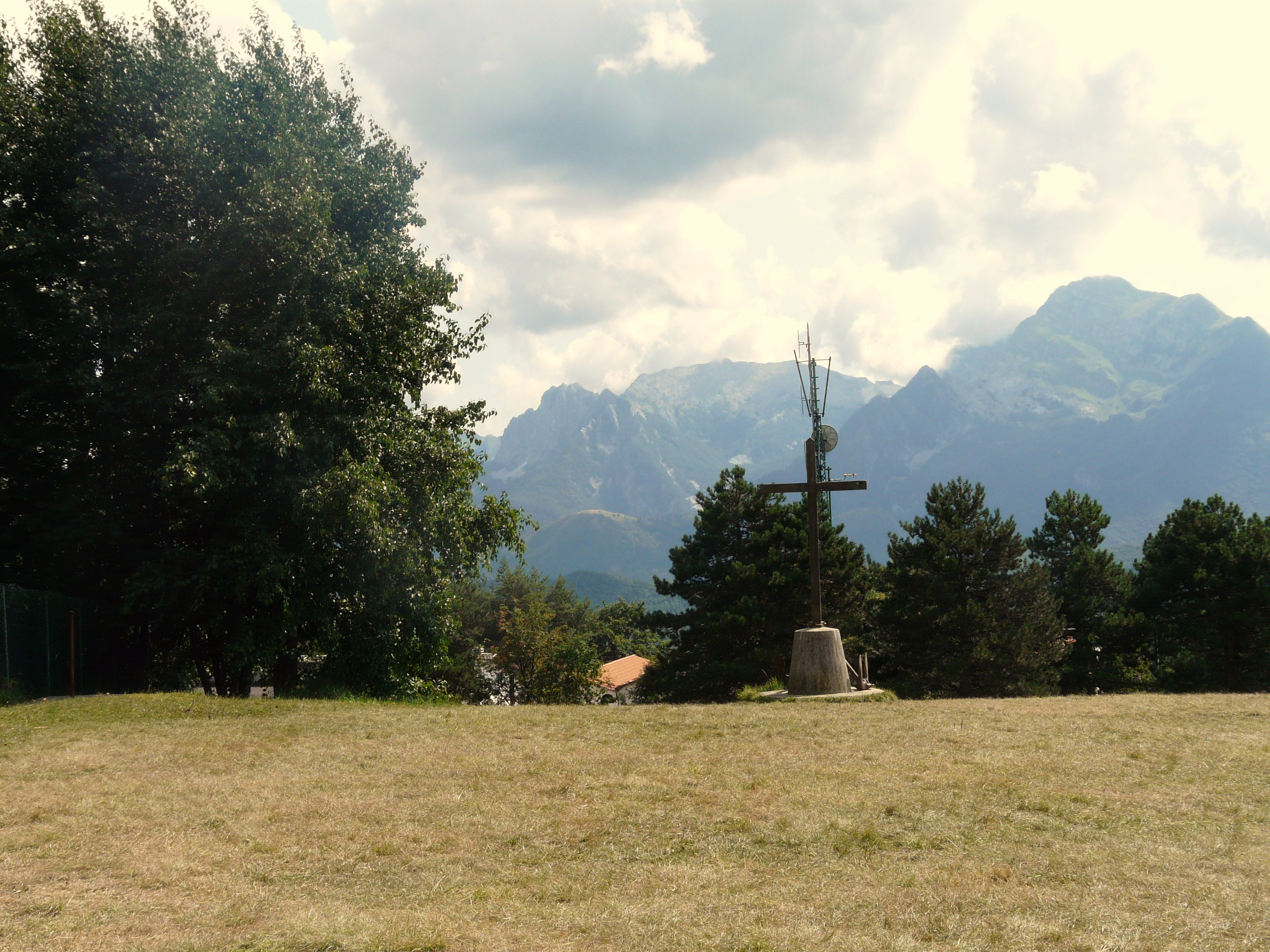
- Argegna Mount, Giuncugnano

- Location of Giuncugnano in Italy
- Coordinates: 44°13′N 10°15′E
- Country: Italy
- Region: Tuscany
- Province: Lucca (LU)
- Comune: Sillano Giuncugnano

Area
  - Total: 18.9 km^{2} (7.3 sq mi)
- Elevation: 834 m (2,736 ft)

Population (2007)
  - Total: 538
  - Density: 28.5/km^{2} (73.7/sq mi)
- Time zone: UTC+1 (CET)
  - Summer (DST): UTC+2 (CEST)
- Postal code: 55030
- Dialing code: 0583
- Patron saint: St. Antoninus
- Saint day: September 2 and November 30

Giuncugnano is a frazione of the comune (municipality) of Sillano Giuncugnano in the Province of Lucca in the Italian region Tuscany, located about 90 kilometres (56 mi) northwest of Florence and about 45 kilometres (28 mi) northwest of Lucca. It was a separate comune until 1 January 2015.
