= Tardelli =

Tardelli is a surname that may refer to:

- Adriano Tardelli (1896–1945), Italian resistance activist during World War II
- Diego Tardelli (born 1985), Brazilian footballer
- Juninho Tardelli (born 1983), Brazilian footballer
- Marco Tardelli (born 1954), Italian footballer and coach
