= Sillano =

- Frazione
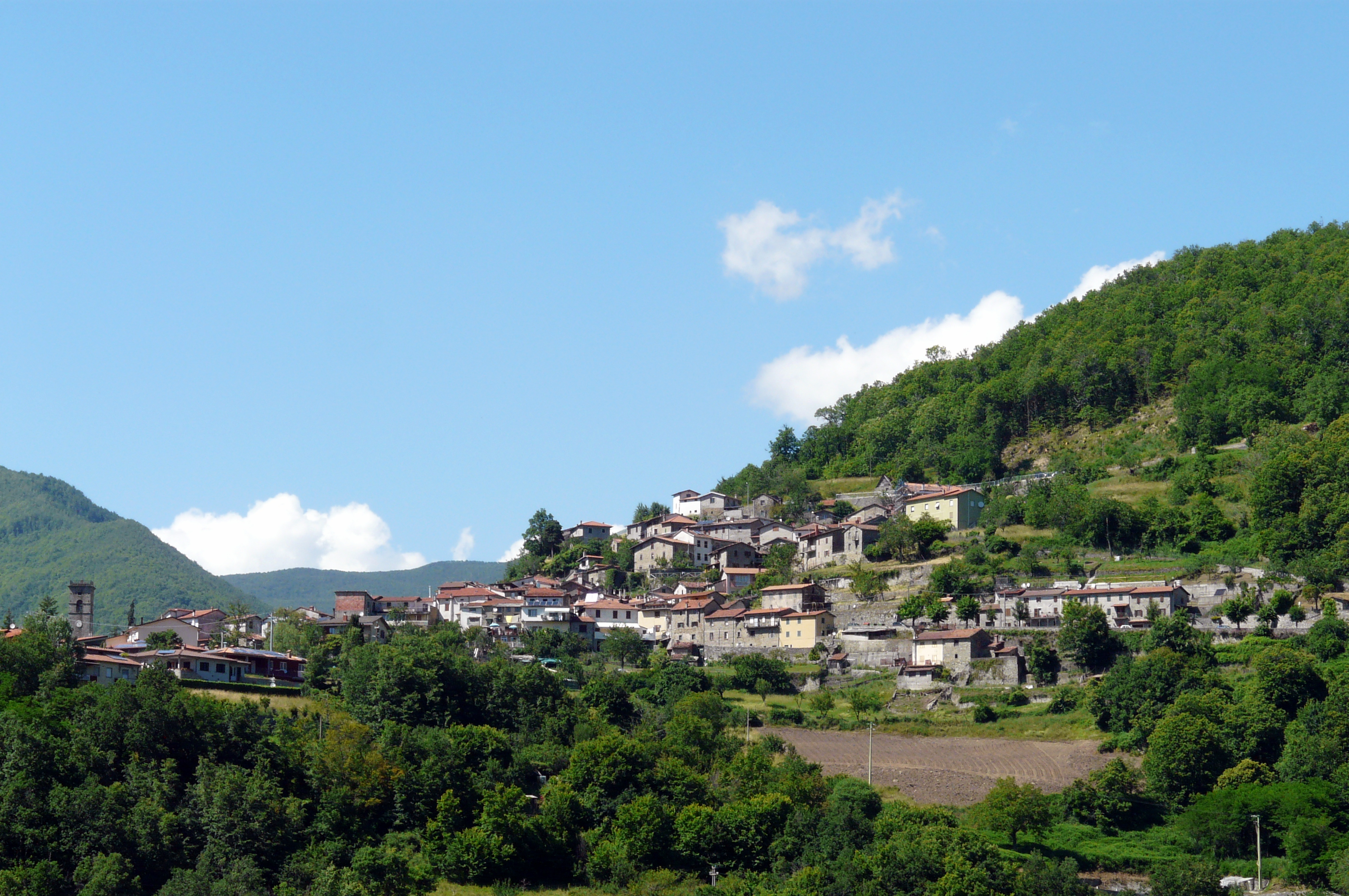
- Panorama of Sillano

- Location of Sillano in Italy
- Coordinates: 44°13′22″N 10°18′07″E
- Country: Italy
- Region: Tuscany
- Province: Lucca (LU)
- Comune: Sillano Giuncugnano

Area
  - Total: 62.2 km^{2} (24.0 sq mi)
- Elevation: 735 m (2,411 ft)

Population (Dec. 2004)
  - Total: 767
  - Density: 12.3/km^{2} (31.9/sq mi)
- Time zone: UTC+1 (CET)
  - Summer (DST): UTC+2 (CEST)
- Postal code: 55030
- Dialing code: 0583

Sillano is a frazione of the comune (municipality) of Sillano Giuncugnano in the Province of Lucca in the Italian region Tuscany, located about 90 kilometres (56 mi) northwest of Florence and about 45 kilometres (28 mi) northwest of Lucca. It was a separate comune until 1 January 2015
