= Master of Borsigliana =

Italian painter

The Master of Borsigliana, also known as Pietro da Talada (active 1463–1499) was an Italian painter active in the Garfagnana, the mountainous corner of modern Tuscany, located north-east of Lucca.

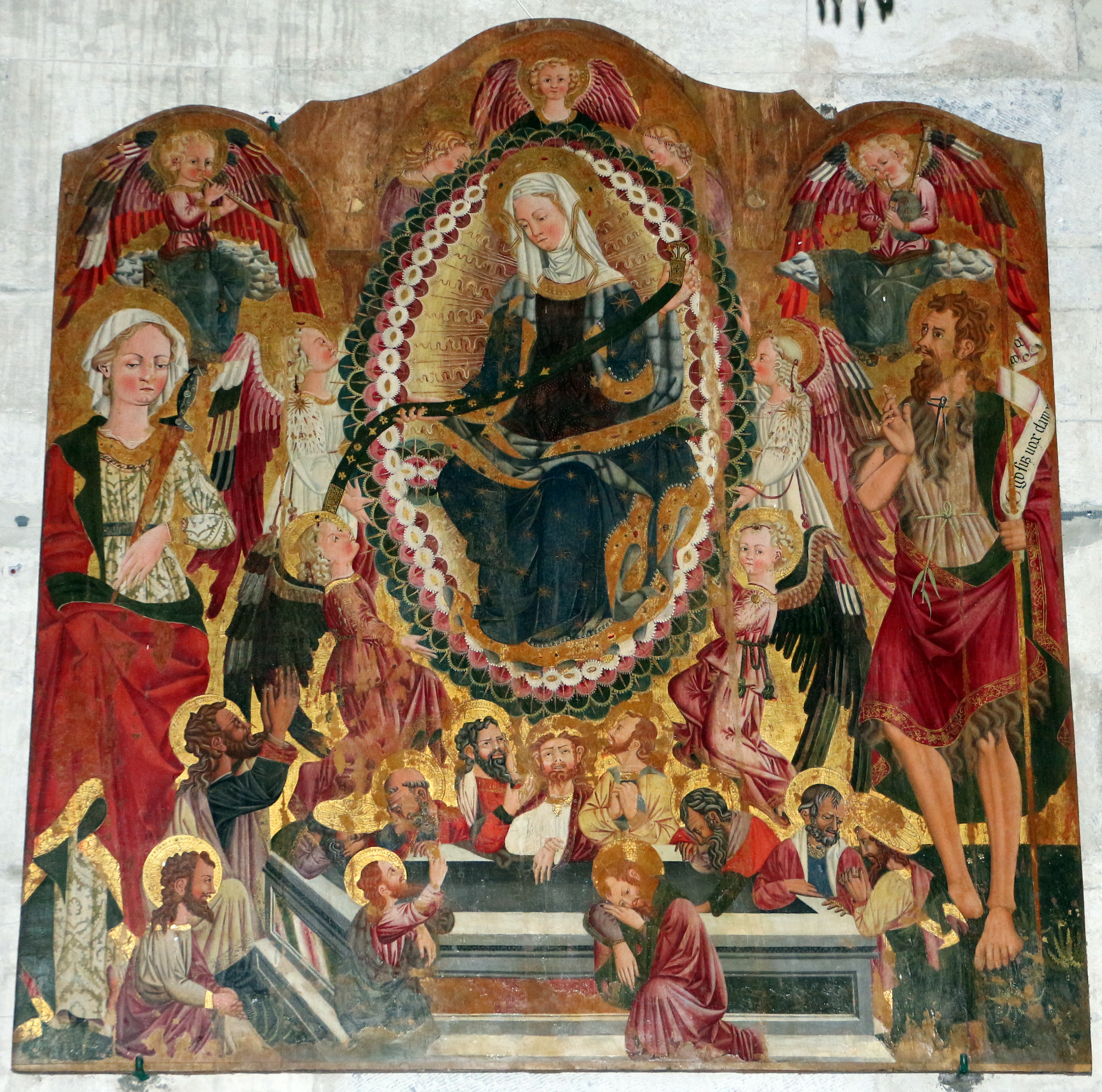
Assumption of the Madonna della Cintola, circa 1470.

== Biography ==
Almost no details are known about his life. He is a provincial painter who mixes influences from both the Tuscan Quattrocento and late Gothic period. He is known from pieces derived from a few religious paintings and predellas, including a triptych at the church of Santa Maria Assunta, Borsigliana and a painting at Santa Maria Assunta at Stazzema. There is a painting of an enthroned Madonna at the Museo Nazionale of Villa Guinigi in Lucca.
