= Adriano Tardelli =

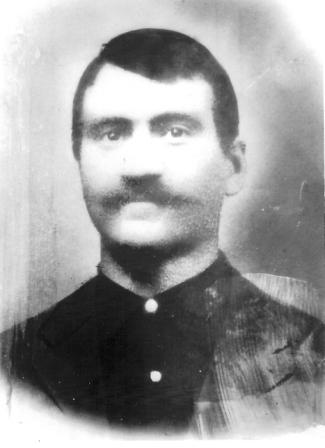
- Adriano Tardelli
- Born: 1904; Capanne di Careggine
- Died: 1 February 1945 (aged 40–41); Cogna, Piazza al Serchio, Tuscany
- Occupation: Resistance activist

Adriano Tardelli (1904 – 1 February 1945) was an Italian resistance activist during World War II.

Tardelli was born in Capanne di Careggine. During the Second World War he led dozens of people to safety (Jews, Slavs, Roma, homosexuals, deserters, partisans, members of resistance groups) crossing with a small group at a time over the Gothic Line. While roped together in the darkness, they crossed the well-known Apennine Mountains, where he had been born and later lived with his wife and their nine children.

On 1 February 1945, Tardelli was executed in reprisal by the Fascist Army in Cogna, Piazza al Serchio, Tuscany. He was being held in the jail of Camporgiano when he was singled out for retaliation with five other people, also held for political reasons, under the order of General Mario Carloni of the 4th Italian "Monte Rosa" Alpine Division.

Before being executed, Tardelli took his shoes off and asked them to be given to the poor.

== Sources ==
- Gabrielli Rosi Carlo, Mariani Sergio (a cura di), Cuore 1944. 100 episodi della resistenza europea, Edizioni Il Centro di Educazione Democratica, Lucca 1975, 422 pp.
- La Resistenza in Lucchesia: racconti e cronache della lotta antifascista e partigiana, La Nuova Italia, Firenze 1965, 225 pp.
- Bertolini Renzo, La Resistenza in Garfagnana, Eurograf, Lucca 1975, 135 pp.
- Zerbini Bruno, Un partigiano isolato, Lalli, Poggibonsi 1984, 187 pp.
- Pinagli Palmiro, La guerra in Garfagnana. Diario: 30 aprile 1944-22 aprile 1945, Edizioni della Rocca, Castelnuovo Garfagnana 1987, 118 pp.
- Guidi Oscar, (a cura di) Con la guerra negli occhi. Donne e uomini di Garfagnana raccontano 1943–45, Pacini Fazzi Editore, Lucca 2005, 191 pp.
- Guidi Oscar, Documenti di guerra. Garfagnana 1943–1945, Pacini Fazzi Editore, Lucca 1995, 198 pp.
- Federigi Fabrizio, Soldato Hans! A Sant'Anna! Dramma in due tempi e quattro quadri. n. 2, Mauro Baroni editore, Lucca 2000, pp. n.n.
