= George Williams (priest) =

George Williams (1814–1878) was an English cleric, academic and antiquary.

== Early life ==
Born at Eton on 4 April 1814, Williams was son of Edward Williams, a bookseller and publisher there. He was educated on the foundation at Eton College, in the first form of the lower school in 1820, and was admitted scholar on 15 September 1829. On 14 July 1832 he was admitted to a scholarship at King's College, Cambridge, and was a fellow from 14 July 1835 to 1870. He graduated B.A. 1837, M.A. 1840, was admitted ad eundem at Oxford on 10 June 1847, and proceeded B.D. at Cambridge in 1849.

== Chaplain abroad ==
In 1837 Williams was ordained, and on 22 September 1838 he was appointed by Eton College to the perpetual curacies of Great Bricet and Wattisham, which he held until Michaelmas 1840. He was appointed by Archbishop William Howley to accompany Bishop Michael Alexander as chaplain to Jerusalem, and was there from 1841 to May 1843. He then served as chaplain at St. Petersburg (1844–5). He was left with the project bringing together the Greek and Anglican churches.

== Cambridge and Rathfarnham ==
In 1846 Williams took up residence at Cambridge. He filled the post of Dean of Arts at King's until 1848, and that of Dean of Divinity from 1848 to 1850. In 1848 he was also nominated as Chaplain at Stockholm by the Bishop of London, Charles James Blomfield, but was unable to take up the post owing to his duties at King's.

In 1850 Williams was appointed warden of St. Columba's College at Rathfarnham, near Dublin. The college was mainly kept in existence by the support of Lord John George de la Poer Beresford, the archbishop of Armagh. When, in 1853, Williams joined with George Anthony Denison, Edward Pusey and others in protests against the actions of Samuel Gobat, the then bishop of Jerusalem, for attempting to convert adherents of the Greek Orthodox church, the archbishop called on him to resign. An angry correspondence then ensued, and the archbishop broke his connection with the college but Williams retained his post until 1856.

From 1854 to 1857 Williams was vice-provost of King's College, Cambridge, and in 1858 he acted as pro-proctor to the university. He was unpopular, and his nomination as proctor was rejected by the university senate on 1 October 1860, the nonplacets being 29 and the placets 26.

== Later life ==
In 1858 Williams took temporary charge of Cumbrae College in Buteshire, and was appointed an honorary canon of there in 1864. The college had been founded in 1849 by George Boyle, 6th Earl of Glasgow, a Tractarian layman. Williams made a long journey in Russia in 1860, with a view to spreading knowledge of the benefits available for foreign communities at English universities; and he printed in that year a French tract on the project to establish at Cambridge hostels for visitors of the Greek or Armenian churches, but nothing came from the scheme.

After a tour in the East with the Marquess of Bute, and several years in residence at Cambridge, Williams was presented by his college on 9 February 1869 to the vicarage of Ringwood in Hampshire. He was Lady Margaret preacher at Cambridge in 1870, and was created honorary canon of Winchester Cathedral in 1874.

== Death ==
One of the last deeds of Williams's life was to send his signature to the clerical declaration against war with Russia. He died suddenly at the Church Farm, Harbridge, one of the chapelries of Ringwood, on 26 January 1878, and was buried at Harbridge on 1 Feb. A reredos was erected in Ringwood church as a memorial to his memory, a prize for distinction in the theological Tripos was founded at Cambridge, and a bronze tablet, with a portrait-bust in relief, designed by W. Burgess, R.A., was placed in King's College chapel.

== Works ==
Williams contributed to the Christian Remembrancer, The Ecclesiologist, and The Guardian. He brought out in 1845 The Holy City with illustrations from sketches by William Frederick Witts. A second edition included an Architectural History of the Church of the Holy Sepulchre by Robert Willis (1849, 2 vols.). For this work he received from the King of Prussia a medal for literary merit.

Williams invited Ermete Pierotti to Cambridge, assisted him in preparing his work of Jerusalem Explored for the press, and revised it during printing. Pierotti was in fact a cashiered officer of the Sardinian Army, who had moved into archaeology in the 1850s. He was accused by James Fergusson and others of plagiarism, and Williams defended him in Dr. Pierotti and his Assailants, 1864. Pierotti, however, was soon discredited as a scholar.

Williams published in 1846 a collection of Sermons preached at Jerusalem in 1842 and 1843, and supplied the introduction to William Wey's Itineraries to Jerusalem and Compostella, printed for the Roxburghe Club in 1857. A description of The Holy Land: Travels in Palestine from Dan to Beersheba, announced in 1849, never appeared.

Williams edited in 1868 The Orthodox Church of the East in the Eighteenth Century, correspondence between the eastern patriarchs and the nonjuring bishops on the reunion of the Greek church and the Anglican communion; and he edited, with introduction and an appendix of illustrative documents, for the Rolls Series, in 1872, two volumes of official correspondence of Thomas Beckington. He was one of the two cataloguers of Monastic Cartularies for the catalogue of manuscripts at the Cambridge University Library, vol. iv., and he described the Baumgartner Papers in vol. v. Other writings included articles in William Smith's dictionaries of Greek and Roman geography, Christian biography, and Christian antiquities.

== Notes ==
Attribution

This article incorporates text from a publication now in the public domain: Lee, Sidney, ed. (1900). "Williams, George (1814-1878)". Dictionary of National Biography. Vol. 61. London: Smith, Elder & Co.
