= Vagli Sotto =

- Comune
- Comune di Vagli Sotto
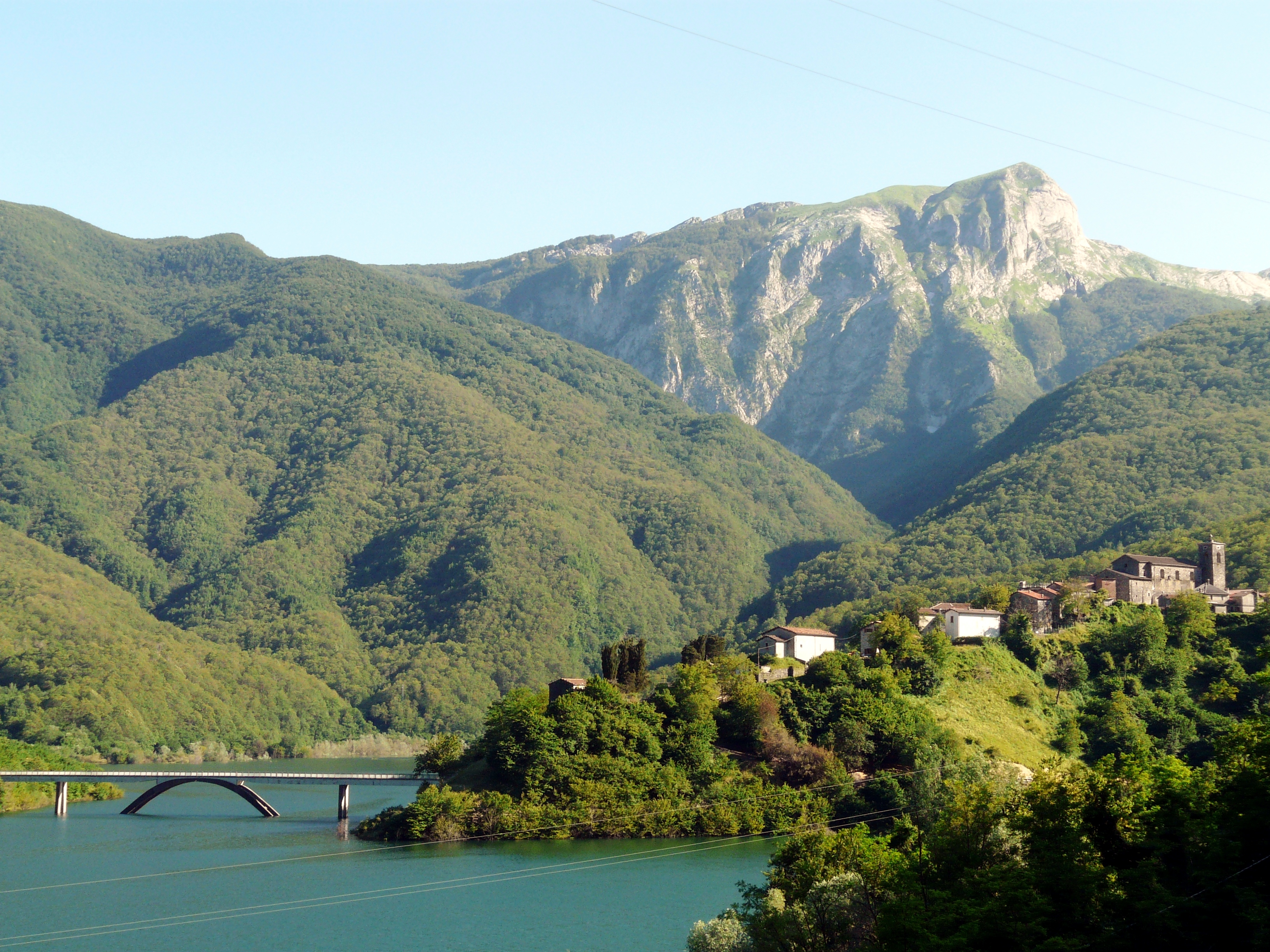

- Coat of arms

- Location within Italy Location within Tuscany
- Coordinates: 44°7′N 10°17′E
- Country: Italy
- Region: Tuscany
- Province: Lucca (LU)
- Frazioni: Roggio, Vagli Sopra

Government
  - Mayor: Giovanni Lodovici

Area
  - Total: 41.0 km^{2} (15.8 sq mi)
- Elevation: 600 m (2,000 ft)

Population (31 March 2017)
  - Total: 922
  - Density: 22.5/km^{2} (58.2/sq mi)
- Demonym(s): Vaglini, Roggesi (in Roggio)
- Time zone: UTC+1 (CET)
  - Summer (DST): UTC+2 (CEST)
- Postal code: 55030
- Dialing code: 0583
- Website: Official website

Vagli Sotto is a comune (municipality) in the Province of Lucca in the Italian region of Tuscany, located about 90 kilometres (56 miles) northwest of Florence and about 35 kilometres (22 mi) northwest of Lucca.

Sotto borders the following municipalities: Camporgiano, Careggine, Massa, Minucciano, Stazzema. The Lake of Vagli, created by a dam in 1947, and the abandoned village of Fabbriche di Careggina, are located nearby.

The town contains the Romanesque church of San Regolo.
