= San Romano in Garfagnana =

- Comune
- Comune di San Romano in Garfagnana
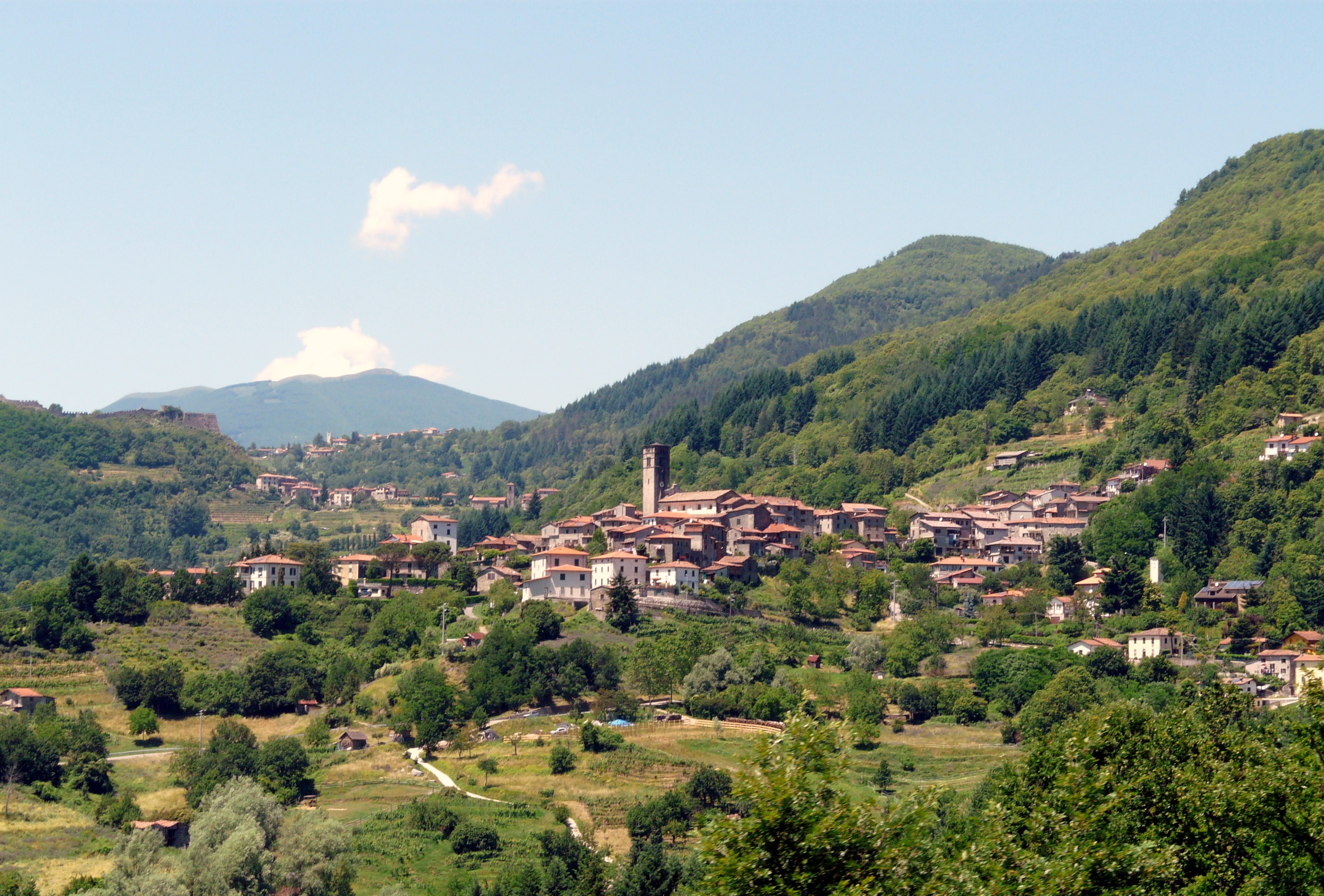
- Panorama of San Romano in Garfagnana

- Coat of arms

- Location within Italy Location within Tuscany
- Coordinates: 44°10′N 10°21′E
- Country: Italy
- Region: Tuscany
- Province: Lucca
- Frazioni: Caprignana, Naggio, Orzaglia, Sillicagnana, Verrucole, Vibbiana, Villetta

Government
  - Mayor: Raffaella Mariani

Area
  - Total: 26.16 km^{2} (10.10 sq mi)
- Elevation: 555 m (1,821 ft)

Population (31 March 2017)
  - Total: 1,402
  - Density: 53.59/km^{2} (138.8/sq mi)
- Demonym: Sanromani
- Time zone: UTC+1 (CET)
  - Summer (DST): UTC+2 (CEST)
- Postal code: 55038
- Dialing code: 0583
- Website: Official website

San Romano in Garfagnana is a comune (municipality) in the Province of Lucca in the Italian region Tuscany, located about 80 kilometres (50 mi) northwest of Florence and about 40 kilometres (25 mi) northwest of Lucca.

San Romano in Garfagnana borders the following municipalities: Camporgiano, Piazza al Serchio, Pieve Fosciana, Sillano Giuncugnano, Villa Collemandina.
