= San Regolo, Vagli Sotto =

Church in Vagli Sotto, Italy

San Regolo is a Romanesque-style, Roman Catholic church, located in the center of the town of Vagli Sotto in the province of Lucca, Tuscany, Italy. The church overlooks the piazza S. Regolo.

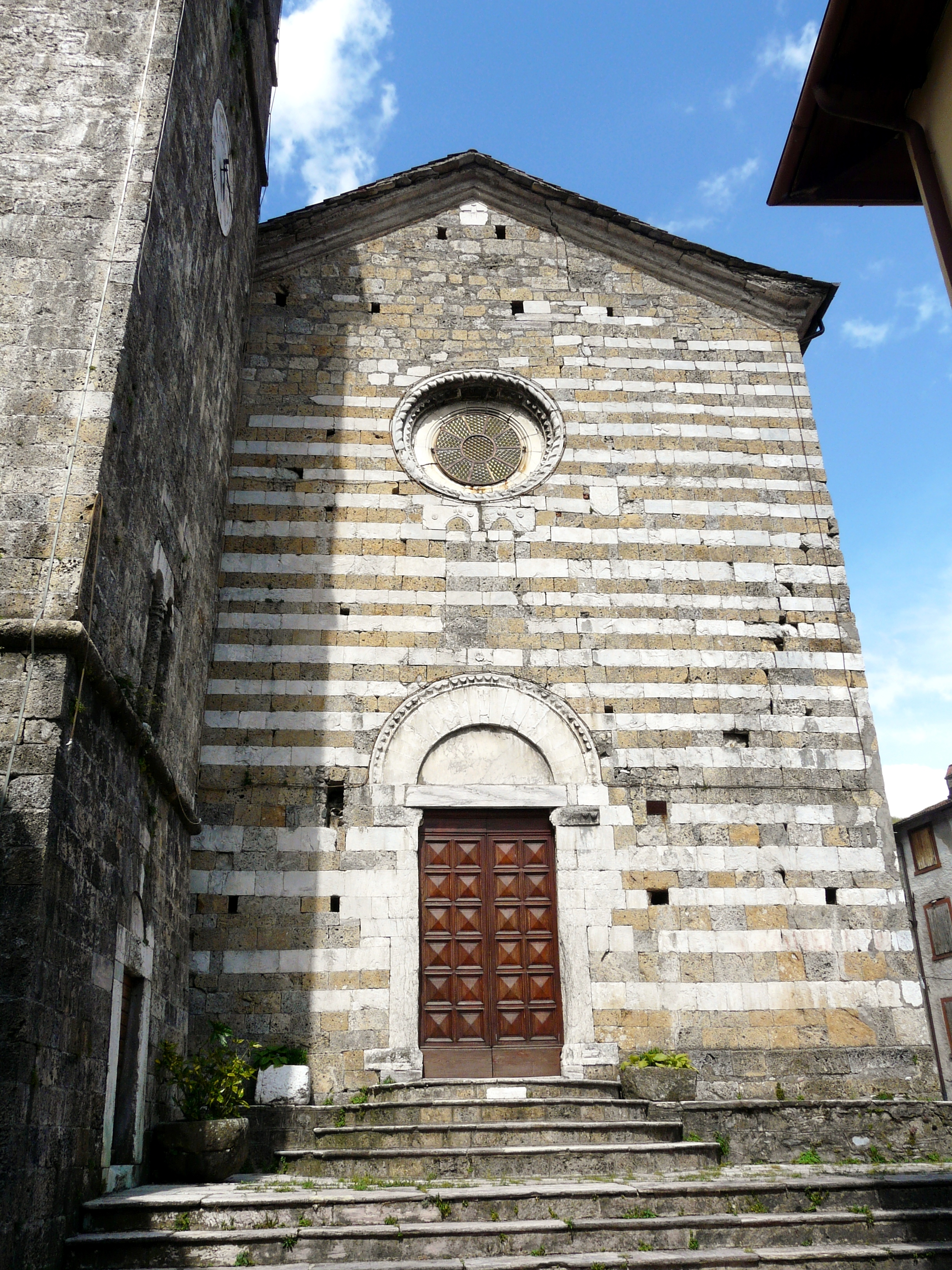
Facade and flanking bell-tower

== History ==
Documents from 1154, cite a church of Santa Maria in Vagli Sotto, which may correspond to this church. The dedication to San Regolo was derived when a nearby church was dedicated to St Augustine. The building dates to the 12th to 13th centuries, with later enlargements and refurbishments. During a pastoral visit in 1568, the church was dedicated to Santa Maria e San Regolo. The construction is rustic, with incomplete lines of alternating white and dark stone in the facade and flanks. The portal with a rounded marble arch, is minimally decorated, and preceded by a circular staircase. The superior portion of the facade has a round oculus.

The interior houses a 15th-century holy water font. It also contains two wooden statues: a 13th-14th century Madonna and child and a 14th-century crucifix attributed to the Maestro del Crocifisso di Camaiore.

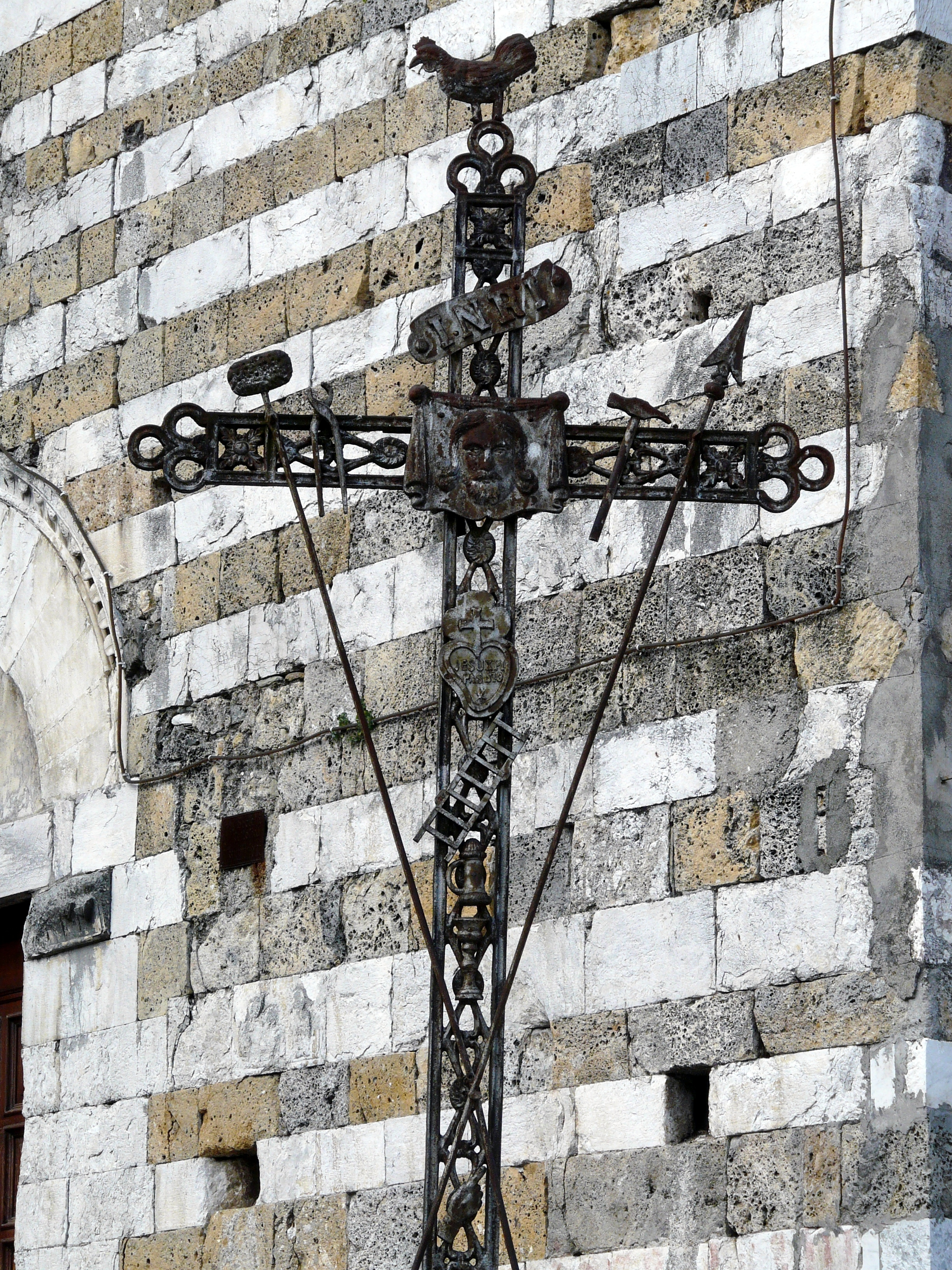
Cross at the entrance
