= Minucciano =

- Comune
- Comune di Minucciano
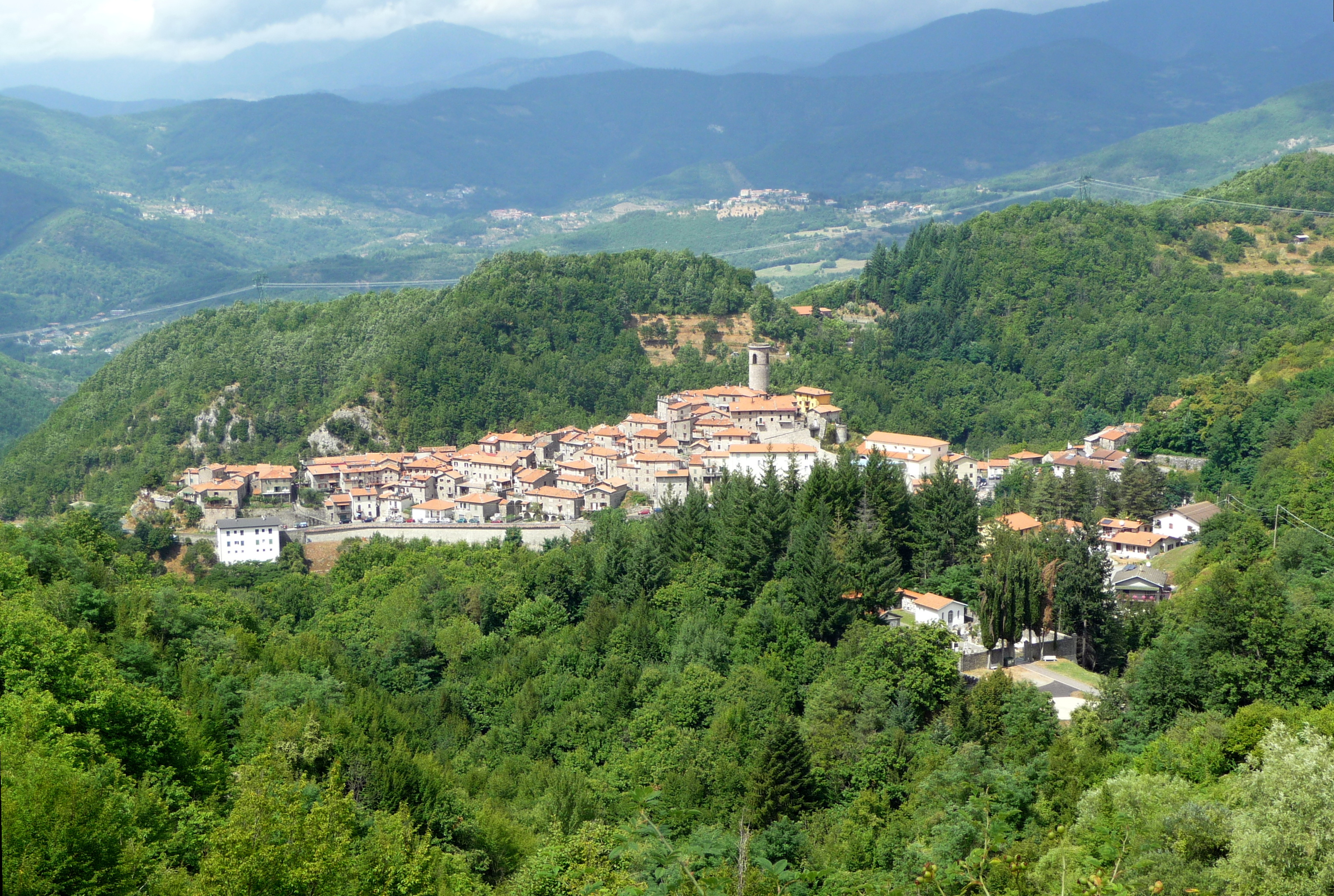

- Coat of arms

- Location within Italy Location within Tuscany
- Coordinates: 44°10′N 10°13′E
- Country: Italy
- Region: Tuscany
- Province: Lucca (LU)
- Frazioni: Agliano, Albiano, Antognano, Canepaia, Carpinelli, Castagnola, Foresto, Gorfigliano, Gramolazzo, Metra, Pieve San Lorenzo, Pugliano, Sermezzana, Verrucolette

Government
  - Mayor: Nicola Poli

Area
  - Total: 57.28 km^{2} (22.12 sq mi)
- Elevation: 697 m (2,287 ft)

Population (31 March 2017)
  - Total: 2,035
  - Density: 35.53/km^{2} (92.02/sq mi)
- Demonym: Minuccianesi
- Time zone: UTC+1 (CET)
  - Summer (DST): UTC+2 (CEST)
- Postal code: 55034
- Dialing code: 0583
- Website: Official website

Minucciano is a comune (municipality) in the Province of Lucca in the Italian region Tuscany, located about 90 kilometres (56 mi) northwest of Florence and about 45 kilometres (28 mi) northwest of Lucca.

Minucciano borders the following municipalities: Camporgiano, Casola in Lunigiana, Fivizzano, Massa, Piazza al Serchio, Sillano Giuncugnano, Vagli Sotto.
