= Piazza al Serchio =

- Comune
- Comune di Piazza al Serchio
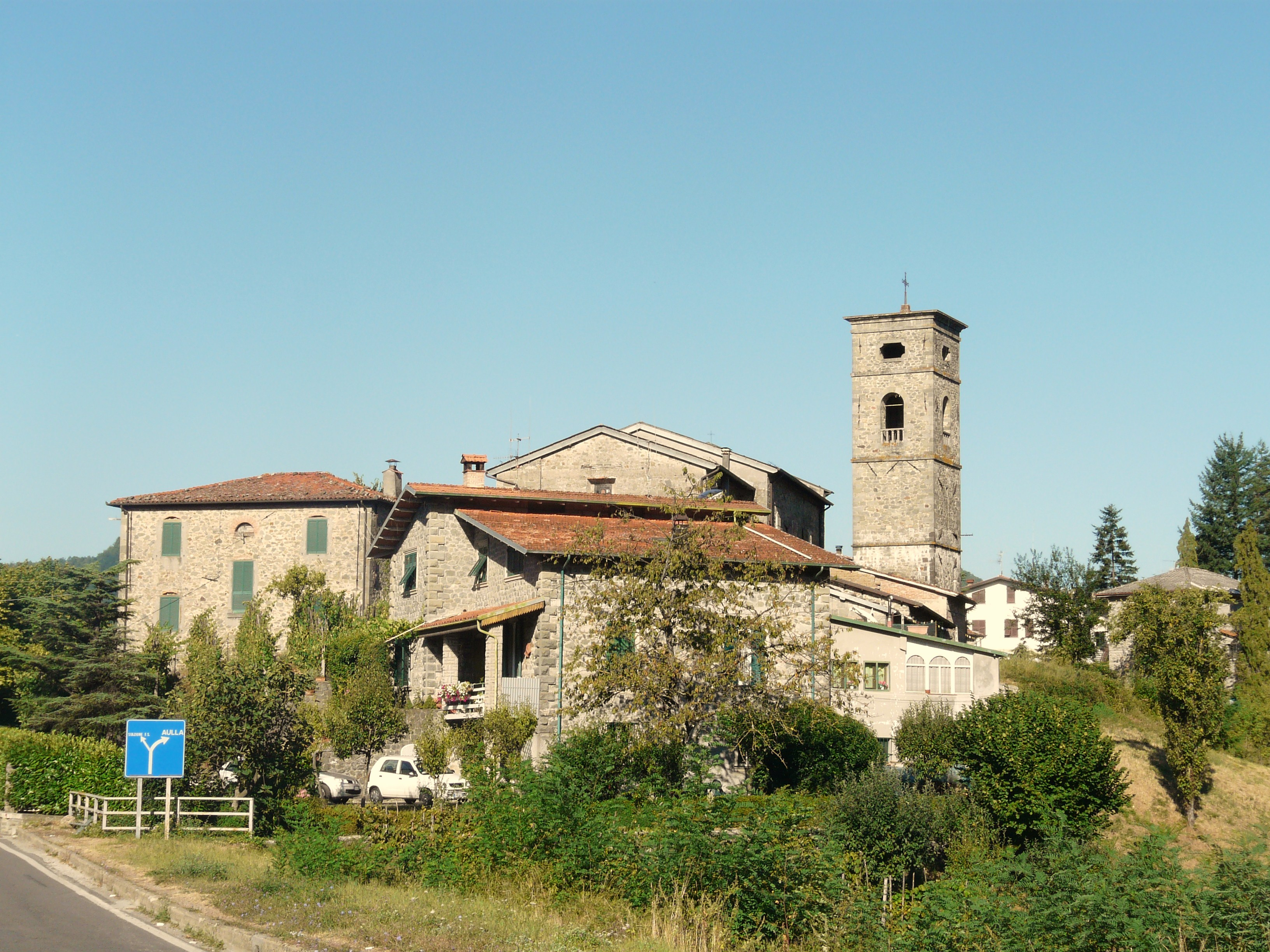

- Coat of arms

- Location within Italy Location within Tuscany
- Coordinates: 44°11′N 10°18′E
- Country: Italy
- Region: Tuscany
- Province: Lucca (LU)
- Frazioni: Borsigliana, Cogna, Colognola, Cortia, Gragnana, Livignano, Nicciano, Petrognano, Petrognola, San Donnino, San Michele, Sant'Anastasio, Vergnano

Government
  - Mayor: Andrea Carrari

Area
  - Total: 27.03 km^{2} (10.44 sq mi)
- Elevation: 536 m (1,759 ft)

Population (31 March 2018)
  - Total: 2,274
  - Density: 84.13/km^{2} (217.9/sq mi)
- Demonym: Piazzini
- Time zone: UTC+1 (CET)
  - Summer (DST): UTC+2 (CEST)
- Postal code: 55035
- Dialing code: 0583
- Website: Official website

Piazza al Serchio is a comune (municipality) in the Province of Lucca in the Italian region Tuscany, located about 90 kilometres (56 mi) northwest of Florence and about 40 kilometres (25 mi) northwest of Lucca.

Piazza al Serchio borders the following municipalities: Camporgiano, Minucciano, San Romano in Garfagnana, Sillano Giuncugnano.

The Romanesque stone church of Santa Maria Assunta is located in the frazione of Borsigliana.

The town is served by the Piazza al Serchio railway station.
