= Fosciandora =

- Comune
- Comune di Fosciandora
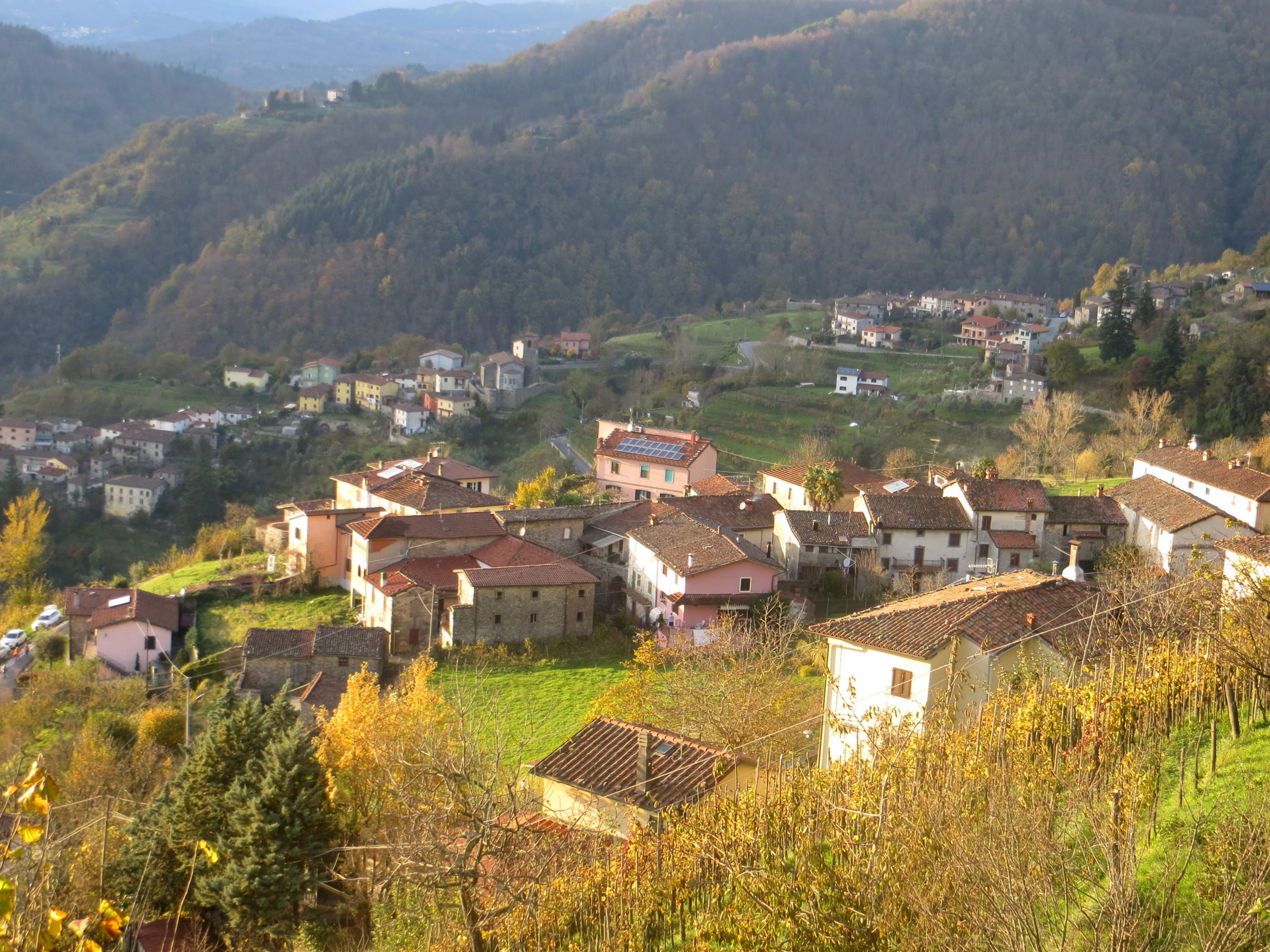
- View of two of the frazioni in the municipality, La Villa and Ceserana

- Coat of arms

- Location within Italy Location within Tuscany
- Coordinates: 44°7′N 10°28′E
- Country: Italy
- Region: Tuscany
- Province: Lucca (LU)
- Frazioni: Ponte di Ceserana, Ceserana, La Villa, Lupinaia, Fosciandora, Migliano, Treppignana, Riana

Government
  - Mayor: Moreno Lunardi

Area
  - Total: 19.8 km^{2} (7.6 sq mi)
- Elevation: 390 m (1,280 ft)

Population (31 May 2023)
  - Total: 554
  - Density: 28.0/km^{2} (72.5/sq mi)
- Demonym: Fosciandorini
- Time zone: UTC+1 (CET)
  - Summer (DST): UTC+2 (CEST)
- Postal code: 55020
- Dialing code: 0583
- Website: Official website

Fosciandora (Italian pronunciation: [foʃˈʃandora]) is a comune (municipality) of 554 inhabitants in the Province of Lucca in the Italian region Tuscany, located about 70 kilometres (43 mi) northwest of Florence and about 30 kilometres (19 mi) north of Lucca.

Fosciandora borders the municipalities of Barga, Castelnuovo di Garfagnana, Gallicano, Pieve Fosciana and Pievepelago.

== History ==
The territory of Fosciandora was annexed by the Republic of Lucca in the 13th century. After the House of Este took control of the Garfagnana region, which took place starting from 1429, Fosciandora was divided between two states. The so-called "three lands", or the centres of Treppignana, Riana and Lupinaia, remained under the jurisdiction of Lucca, forming part of the diocese of Gallicano, while the rest of the current municipality – with Ceserana as its capital – was absorbed into the Republic of Florence and subsequently, in 1451, to Borso d'Este, becoming part of the Duchy of Ferrara.

At the end of the 18th century, the Garfagnana region came under the government of the Cispadane Republic which, on 3 March 1799, ordered that each of the three territories of Ceserana, Villa and Fosciandora should form a comune in their own right. A new law of March 1804 brought together these three small municipalities into a single one, which was given the name of the Comunità di Fosciandora.

In 1847, with the entry into force of the Treaty of Florence, the territory of Fosciandora expanded to its current borders and became a province of the Duchy of Modena and Reggio. This continued until 1859, and subsequently with the proclamation of the Kingdom of Italy became part of the Kingdom of Italy.

In 1923 the entire district of Castelnuovo di Garfagnana (including Fosciandora) passed from the Province of Massa-Carrara to the Province of Lucca.

== Monuments and places of interest ==
=== Religious architecture ===
- Church of Sant'Andrea Apostolo in Ceserana
- Church of Santa Maria Assunta in La Villa
- Church of San Pietro in Lupinaia
- Oratory of Maria Santissima Addolorata in Lupinaia
- Church of San Michele Arcangelo in Migliano
- Church of San Sebastiano in Fosciandora
- Church of San Silvestro Pope in Riana
- Church of San Martino bishop in Treppignana
- Sanctuary of Maria Santissima della Stella in Migliano

=== Civil architecture ===
- The mill in the Mulino del Cavallo-Casonza area

== Transport ==
Garfagnana regional road 445 crosses the Fosciandora region, on which public bus services are operated by CTT Nord.

The comune is served by Fosciandora-Ceserana railway station on the Lucca–Aulla railway.

== Gallery ==
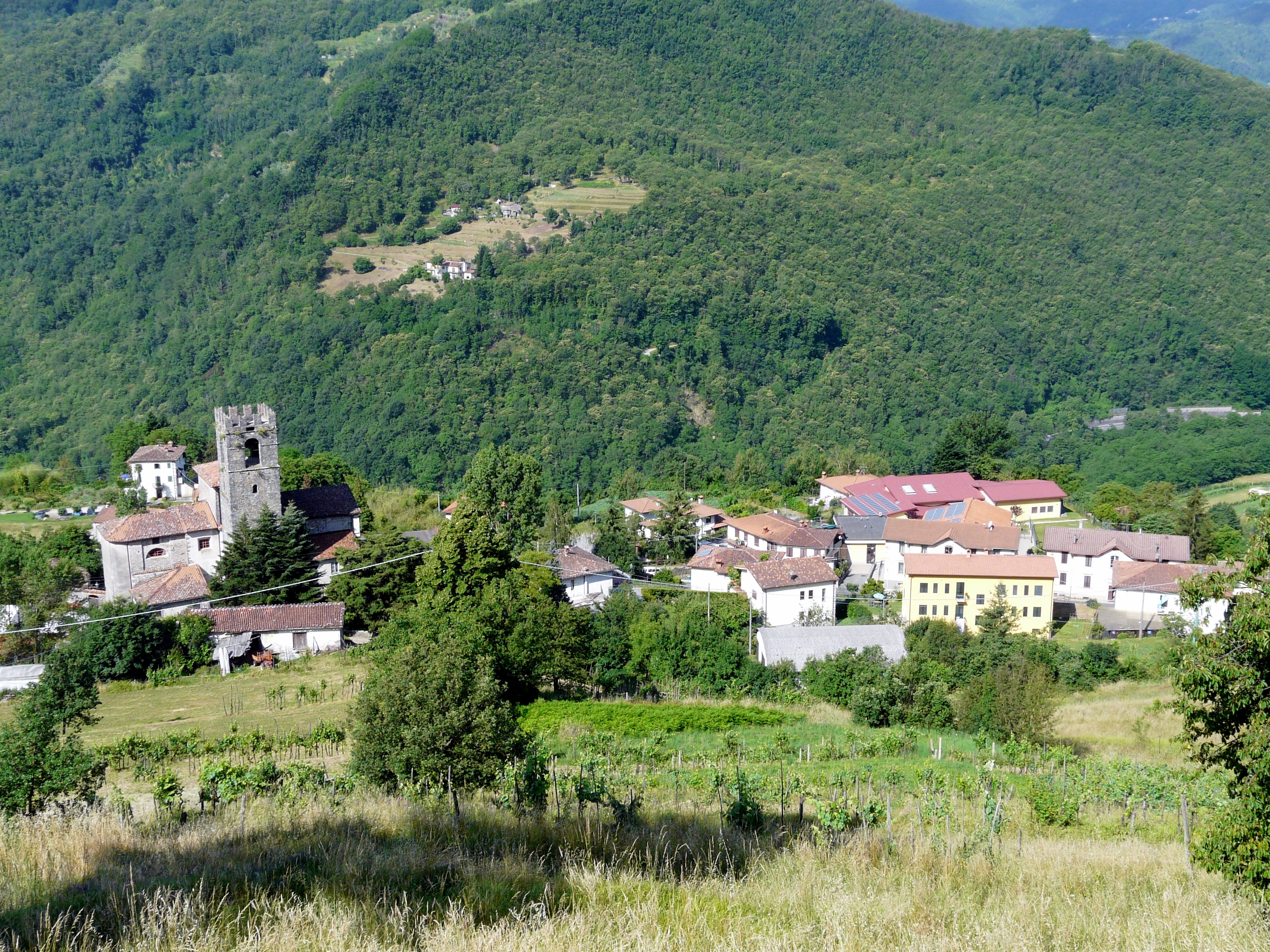
Panorama of the Frazione of Migliano

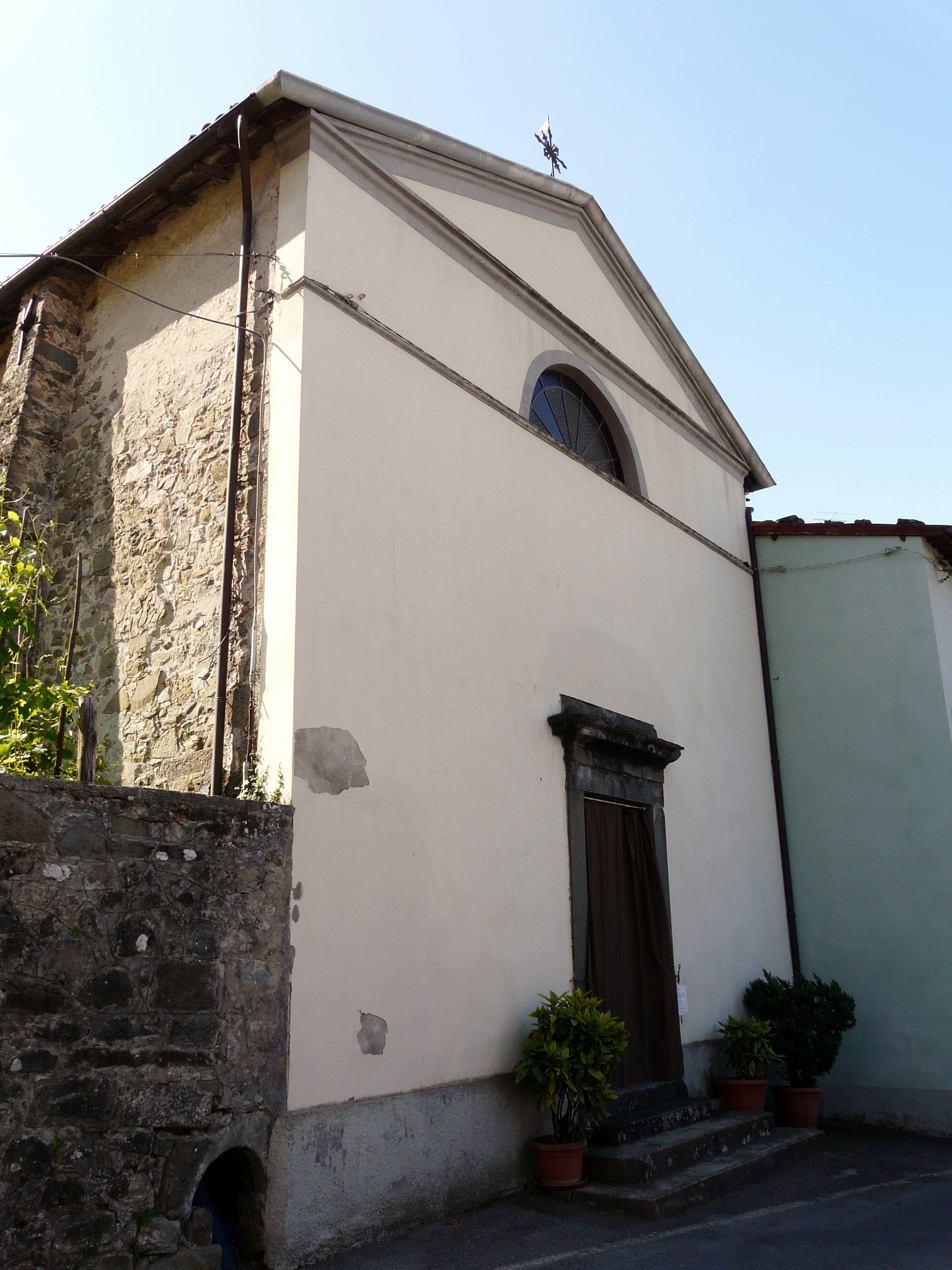
Church in Fosciandora
