= Pieve Fosciana =

- Comune
- Comune di Pieve Fosciana
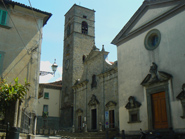

- Coat of arms

- Location within Italy Location within Tuscany
- Coordinates: 44°8′N 10°25′E
- Country: Italy
- Region: Tuscany
- Province: Lucca
- Frazioni: Bargecchia, Capraia, Pellizzana, Pontecosi, Sillico

Government
  - Mayor: Francesco Angelini

Area
  - Total: 28.76 km^{2} (11.10 sq mi)
- Elevation: 369 m (1,211 ft)

Population (31 March 2017)
  - Total: 2,453
  - Density: 85.29/km^{2} (220.9/sq mi)
- Demonym: Pievarini
- Time zone: UTC+1 (CET)
  - Summer (DST): UTC+2 (CEST)
- Postal code: 55036
- Dialing code: 0583
- Website: Official website

Pieve Fosciana is a comune (municipality) in the Province of Lucca in the Italian region Tuscany, located about 80 kilometres (50 mi) northwest of Florence and about 30 kilometres (19 mi) north of Lucca.

Pieve Fosciana borders the following municipalities: Camporgiano, Castelnuovo di Garfagnana, Castiglione di Garfagnana, Fosciandora, Pievepelago, San Romano in Garfagnana, Villa Collemandina.
