= Garfagnina =

Italian breed of cattle

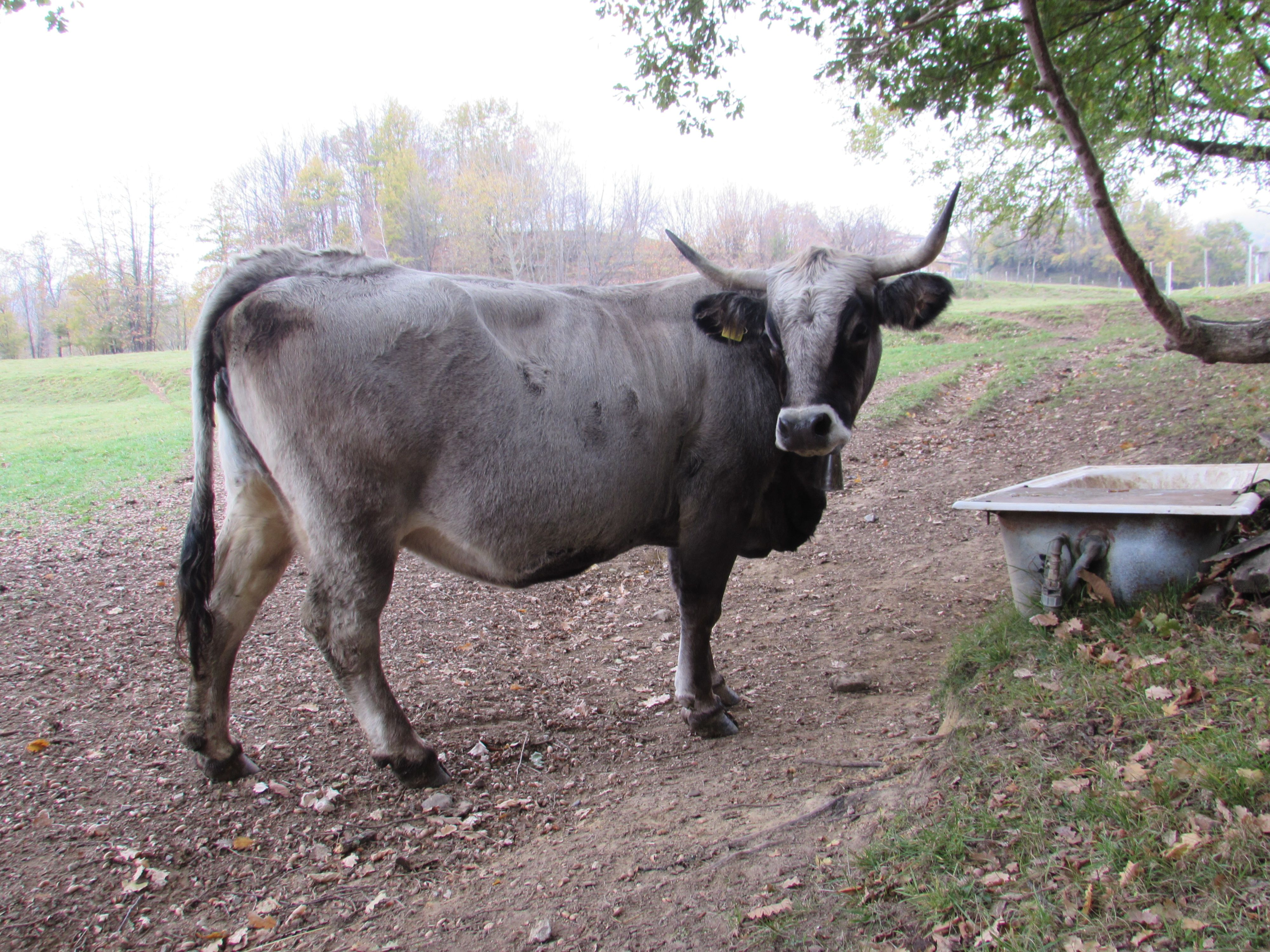
- Country of origin: Italy: Tuscany
- Use: Dual-purpose: milk and beef

Traits
- Coat: Brindled grey
- Horn status: Horned

The Garfagnina is a cattle breed from Tuscany in central Italy. It is one of the 16 minor Italian cattle breeds of limited diffusion recognised and protected by the Ministero delle Politiche Agricole Alimentari e Forestali, the Italian ministry of agriculture.
