= Province of Lucca =

Province of Italy

Province of Lucca Provincia di Lucca (Italian)
- Province
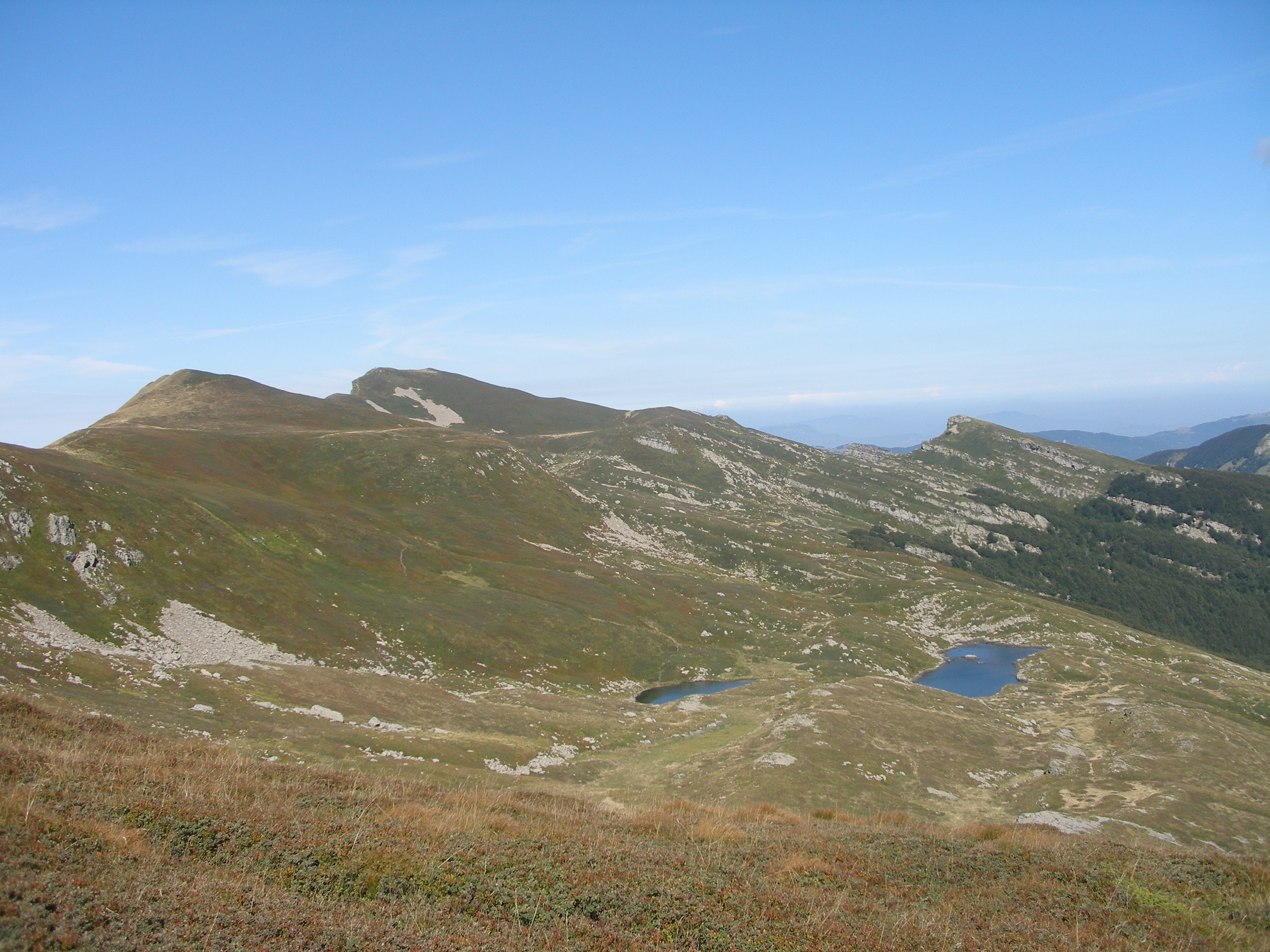
- Laghetti di Compione in Appennino Tosco-Emiliano National Park

- Flag Coat of arms

- Location of the province of Lucca in Italy
- Coordinates: 43°51′N 10°31′E
- Country: Italy
- Region: Tuscany
- Capital(s): Lucca
- Municipalities: 33

Government
  - President: Marcello Pierucci (PD)

Area
  - Total: 1,773.22 km^{2} (684.64 sq mi)

Population (2026)
  - Total: 379,957
  - Density: 214.275/km^{2} (554.970/sq mi)

GDP
  - Total: €10.543 billion (2015)
  - Per capita: €26,871 (2015)
- Time zone: UTC+1 (CET)
  - Summer (DST): UTC+2 (CEST)
- Postal code: 55011–55110
- Telephone prefix: 0583 and 0584
- ISO 3166 code: IT-LU
- Vehicle registration: LU
- ISTAT code: 046
- Website: Official website

The Province of Lucca (Italian: Provincia di Lucca) is a province in the region of Tuscany in central Italy. Its capital is the city of Lucca.

It has a population of 379,957 in an area of 1,773.22 square kilometres (684.64 sq mi) across its 33 municipalities.

== Geography ==
Situated in northwestern coastal Italy, within Tuscany, Lucca borders the Ligurian Sea to the west, the provinces of Massa e Carrara to the northwest, Pisa to the south, Pistoia to the north-east and Firenze to the east. To the north it abuts the region of Emilia-Romagna (Provinces of Reggio Emilia and Province of Modena). Access to the Ligurian Sea is through municipalities such as Torre del Lago, Viareggio, and Forte dei Marmi. It is divided into four areas; Piana di Lucca, Versilia, Media Valle del Serchio and Garfagnana. Versilia is known for its extensive beaches, and there are coastal dunes and wetlands in the Migliarino-San Rossore-Massaciuccoli Natural Park. The principal resorts of the province are located at Viareggio, Lido di Camaiore, Pietrasanta and Forte dei Marmi. Garfagnana is known for its wooded hills and olive trees.

Lago di Massaciuccoli is a lake with a surface area of 6.9 square kilometres (2.7 sq mi), located mainly in the municipality of Massarosa and partly in Torre del Lago, a civil parish of Viareggio.

The lake was known in ancient times as the Fossis Papirianis, a name used in the Tabula Peutingeriana. The composer Giacomo Puccini lived nearby and frequently hunted around the lake; today the Puccini Festival is held there annually in celebration. The springs of Bagni di Lucca, in valley of the Lima River, a tributary of the Serchio are known from the early history of Lucca as the Vicaria di Val di Lima, and Fallopius once claimed that the springs cured his own deafness.

== Government ==
=== Municipalities ===
The province has 33 municipalities:

- Altopascio
- Bagni di Lucca
- Barga
- Borgo a Mozzano
- Camaiore
- Camporgiano
- Capannori
- Careggine
- Castelnuovo di Garfagnana
- Castiglione di Garfagnana
- Coreglia Antelminelli
- Fabbriche di Vergemoli
- Forte dei Marmi
- Fosciandora
- Gallicano
- Lucca
- Massarosa
- Minucciano
- Molazzana
- Montecarlo
- Pescaglia
- Piazza al Serchio
- Pietrasanta
- Pieve Fosciana
- Porcari
- San Romano in Garfagnana
- Seravezza
- Sillano Giuncugnano
- Stazzema
- Vagli Sotto
- Viareggio
- Villa Basilica
- Villa Collemandina

== Demographics ==
As of 2026, the population is 379,957, of which 48.8% are male, and 51.2% are female. Minors make up 13.1% of the population, and seniors make up 27.7%.

Historical population

Year	Pop.	±%
1861	255,973	—
1871	281,945	+10.1%
1881	290,312	+3.0%
1901	311,168	+7.2%
1911	320,246	+2.9%
1921	342,040	+6.8%
1931	346,479	+1.3%
1936	352,205	+1.7%

Year	Pop.	±%
1951	366,899	+4.2%
1961	365,540	−0.4%
1971	380,356	+4.1%
1981	385,876	+1.5%
1991	377,101	−2.3%
2001	372,244	−1.3%
2011	388,327	+4.3%
2021	382,464	−1.5%

Source: ISTAT

=== Immigration ===
As of 2025, immigrants make up 11.7% of the total population. The 5 largest foreign countries of birth are Romania, Albania, Morocco, Sri Lanka, and the United Kingdom.

== Main sights ==
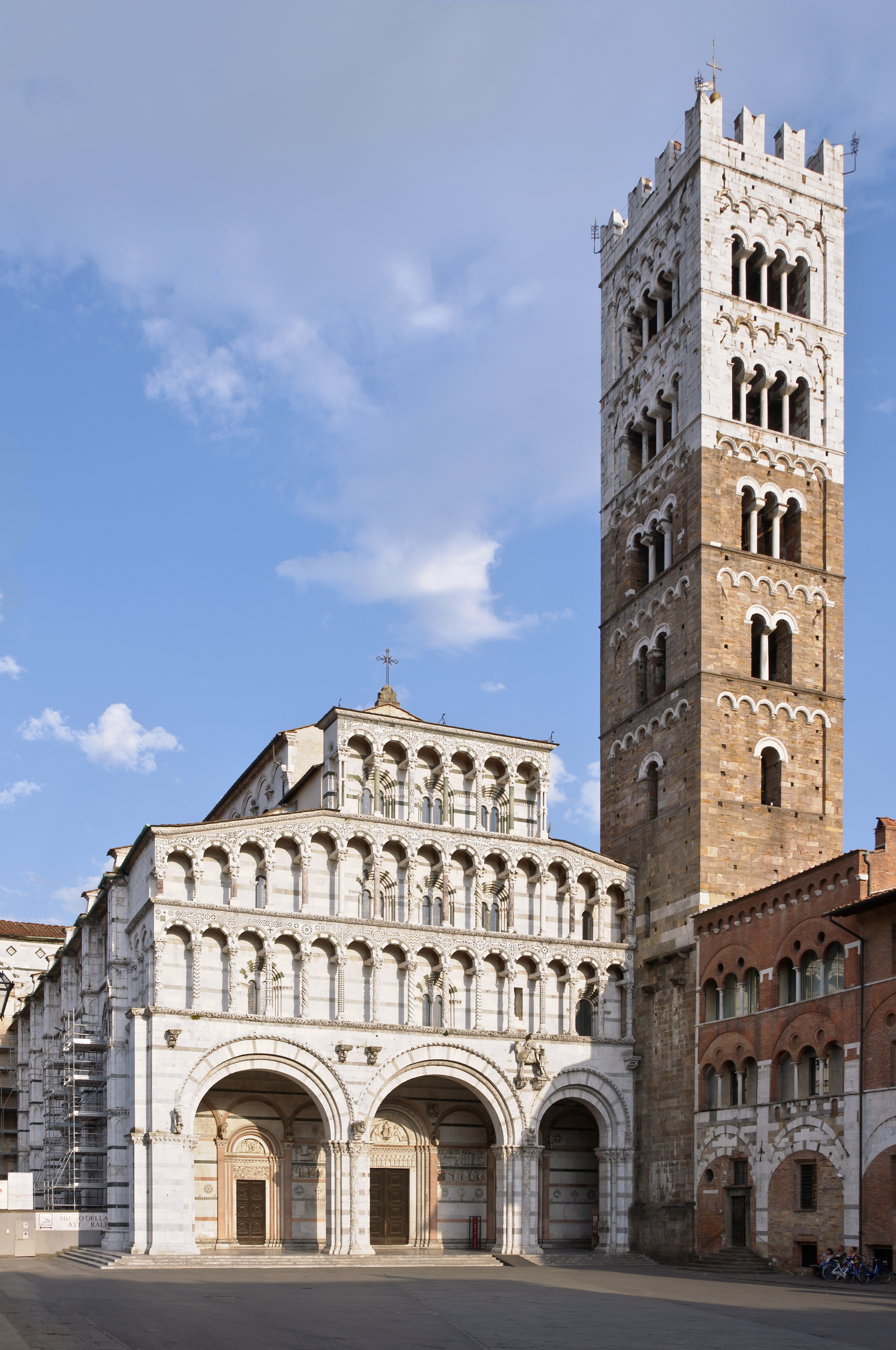
Façade and bell tower of Lucca Cathedral

Situated along the Via Francigena, a major Medieval pilgrimage route, the province is dotted with castles, abbeys, parish churches and villas such as the Villa Torrigiani and Villa Mansi. Lucca Cathedral, also known as the Duomo of San Martino, was originally built in the 6th century, but was rebuilt in the 11th century in the Romanesque style, consecrated by Alexander II in 1070. It was restored again with Tuscan Gothic influences in the 14th century, when columns of the upper arches were added. The Church of San Frediano, also in the city Lucca, is reputed to be only example of Lombard architecture preserved without notable alteration, although the façade dates to about 1200. The church contains some valuable pieces of art, as does the Mansi Palace and the 14th-century Church of San Francesco, which contains the tomb of the Lucchese poet Giovanni Guidiccioni.

The Casa Guinigi and the Guinigi Tower of Lucca is a fine example of remaining medieval architecture in the province; construction began in 1384 to accommodate the wealthy Guinigi family. Paolo Guinigi was a ruler of the town a little later in the early 15th century. 44.25 metres (145.2 ft) high, it was built with sandstone and brick from Matraia and Verrucano from the Monti Pisani. Only one of the original towers remains, and loggia and the porch on the ground floor of it have been shut off.

Also of note is an Aqueduct of Nottolini consisting of 459 arches, constructed between 1823 and 1832.
