= Careggine =

- Comune
- Comune di Careggine
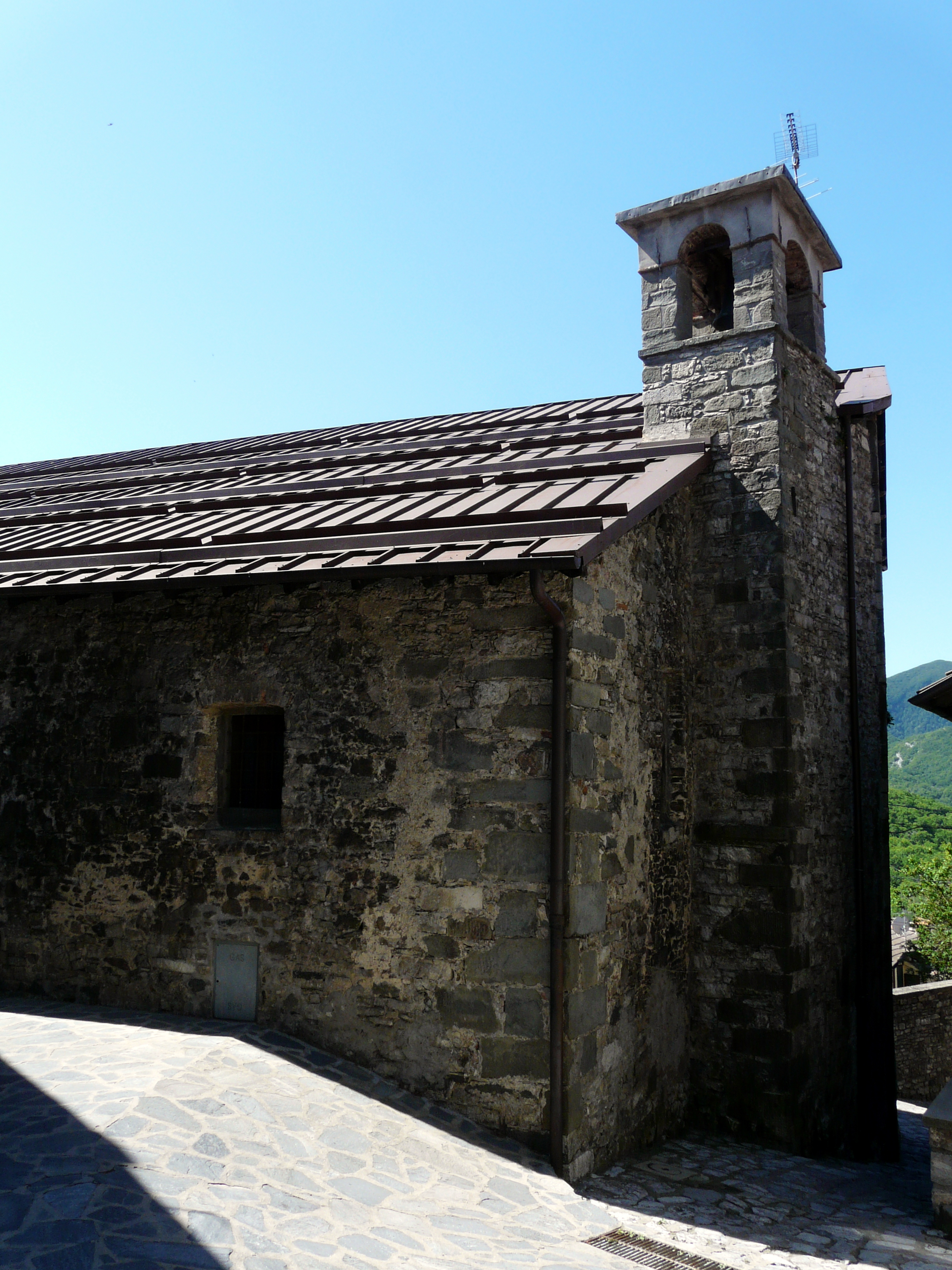
- San Pietro, Careggine

- Coat of arms

- Location within Italy Location within Tuscany
- Coordinates: 44°07′N 10°20′E
- Country: Italy
- Region: Tuscany
- Province: Lucca (LU)
- Frazioni: Capanne, Colli, Iapori, Isola Santa, Lago Di Vagli, Le Coste, Mezzana, Pierdiscini, Porreta, Vianova

Government
  - Mayor: Mario Puppa

Area
  - Total: 24.08 km^{2} (9.30 sq mi)
- Elevation: 882 m (2,894 ft)

Population (31 March 2017)
  - Total: 548
  - Density: 22.8/km^{2} (58.9/sq mi)
- Demonym: Caregginini
- Time zone: UTC+1 (CET)
  - Summer (DST): UTC+2 (CEST)
- Postal code: 55030
- Dialing code: 0583
- Website: Official website

Careggine is a town and comune in the province of Lucca, in northern Tuscany (Italy). It is the birthplace of Italian football player Marco Tardelli and of Adriano Tardelli, one of the heroes of the Italian resistance movement.
