= Sillano Giuncugnano =

- Comune
- Comune di Sillano Giuncugnano
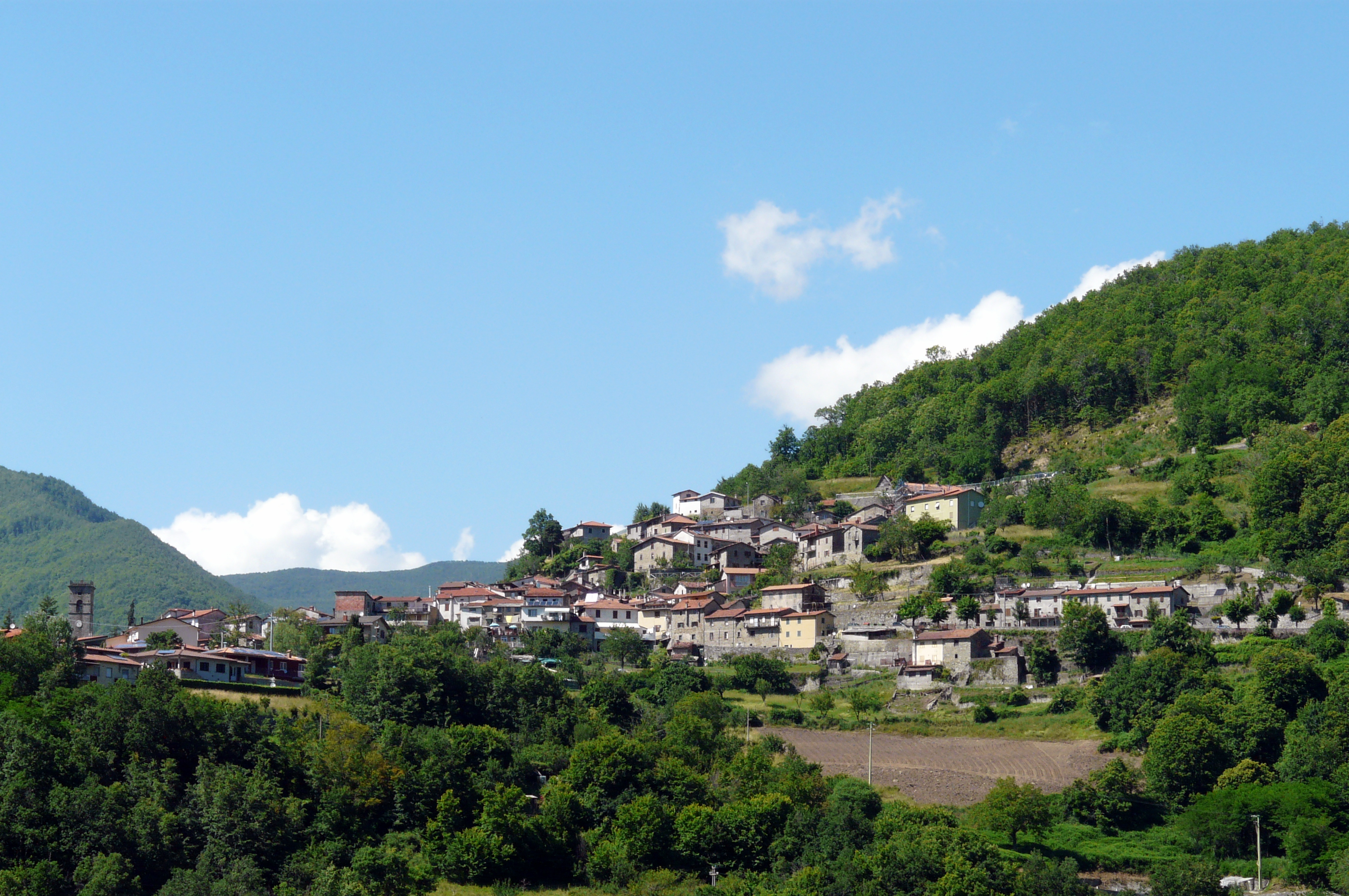
- View of Sillano.

- Location within Italy Location within Tuscany
- Coordinates: 44°14′N 10°18′E
- Country: Italy
- Region: Tuscany
- Province: Lucca (LU)
- Frazioni: Brica, Camporanda, Capanne, Capoli, Castelletto, Dalli Sopra, Dalli Sotto, Giuncugnano, Gragna, Magliano, Metello, Ponteccio, Rocca Soraggio, Sillano (municipal seat), Varliano, Villa Soraggio

Government
  - Mayor: Roberto Pagani

Area
  - Total: 81.30 km^{2} (31.39 sq mi)
- Elevation: 735 m (2,411 ft)

Population (28 February 2010)
  - Total: 7,760
  - Density: 95.4/km^{2} (247/sq mi)
- Demonym(s): Sillanesi and Giuncugnani
- Time zone: UTC+1 (CET)
  - Summer (DST): UTC+2 (CEST)
- Postal code: 55039
- Dialing code: 0583
- Patron saint: St. Hermes Martyr
- Saint day: August 28
- Website: Official website

Sillano Giuncugnano is a comune (municipality) in the Province of Lucca in the Italian region of Tuscany. It was created on 1 January 2015 from the merger of Sillano and Giuncugnano.
