= Camporgiano =

- Comune
- Comune di Camporgiano
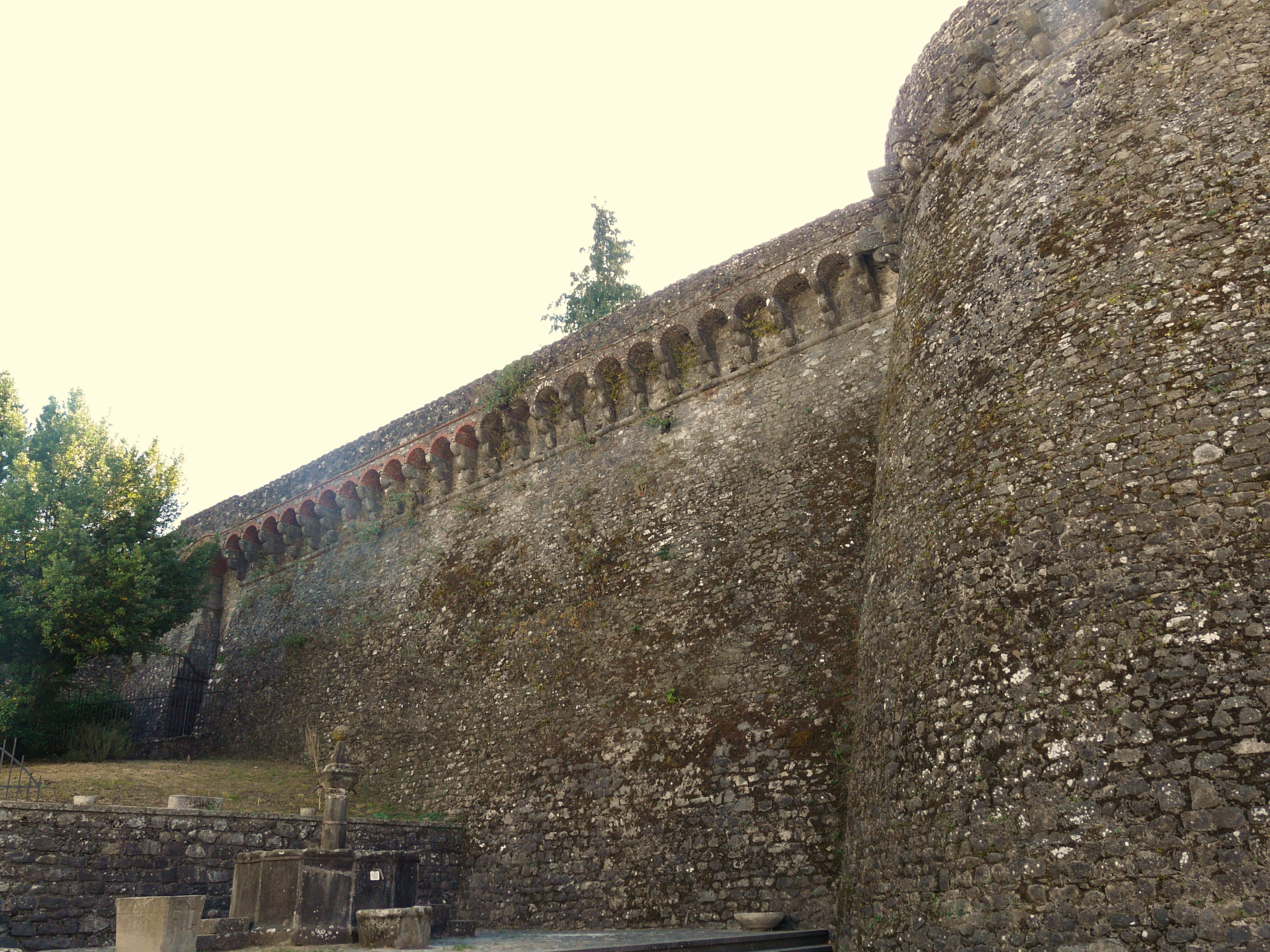
- Fortress of Camporgiano.

- Coat of arms

- Location within Italy Location within Tuscany
- Coordinates: 44°10′N 10°20′E
- Country: Italy
- Region: Tuscany
- Province: Lucca (LU)
- Frazioni: Filicaia, Poggio, Roccalberti, Casatico, Vitoio, Puglianella, Casciana, Cascianella

Government
  - Mayor: Francesco Pifferi

Area
  - Total: 27.09 km^{2} (10.46 sq mi)
- Elevation: 475 m (1,558 ft)

Population (31 March 2017)
  - Total: 2,132
  - Density: 78.70/km^{2} (203.8/sq mi)
- Demonym: Camporgianesi
- Time zone: UTC+1 (CET)
  - Summer (DST): UTC+2 (CEST)
- Postal code: 55031
- Dialing code: 0583
- Website: Official website

Camporgiano is a comune (municipality) in the Province of Lucca in the Italian region Tuscany, located about 90 kilometres (56 mi) northwest of Florence and about 40 kilometres (25 mi) northwest of Lucca.

Camporgiano borders the following municipalities: Careggine, Castelnuovo di Garfagnana, Piazza al Serchio, San Romano in Garfagnana, Vagli Sotto.
