= Santi Pietro e Paolo =

Santi Pietro e Paolo may refer to the following churches in Italy:

- Santi Pietro e Paolo, Acireale
- Santi Pietro e Paolo, Arese
- Santi Pietro e Paolo, Brebbia
- Santi Pietro e Paolo, Buonconvento
- Santi Pietro e Paolo, Castelnuovo di Garfagnana
- Santi Pietro e Paolo, Castignano
- Santi Pietro e Paolo, Mineo
- Santi Pietro e Paolo, Monastero di Vasco
- Santi Pietro e Paolo, Siena

== See also ==
- San Paolo (disambiguation)
- San Pietro (disambiguation)
