= Giardino Montano dell' Orecchiella =

Botanical garden in Italy

Coordinates: 44°11′02″N 10°22′46″E

The Giardino Montano dell' Orecchiella is a garden with many ornamental exotic and, to a much lesser extent, native flowers located just below the visitor centre of the Parco dell'Orecchiella. This little garden is not to be confused with the Botanical Garden "Maria Ansaldi" Pania di Corfino which is located close to the latter. Parco dell'Orecchiella il located at north of Castelnuovo di Garfagnana, Province of Lucca, Tuscany, Italy. It is open daily in the warmer months.

The Parco dell'Orecchiella contains a number of karst caves located in the municipalities of Sillano and Collemandina Villa; a total of 31 caves have been located with lengths between 35 and 1120 m. The forest is mainly coniferous with beech groves, as well as Acer pseudoplatanus, Alnus incana, Crataegus monogyna, Fraxinus excelsior, Laburnum anagyroides, Prunus spinosa, Sorbus aria, and Sorbus aucuparia.

== See also ==
- List of botanical gardens in Italy

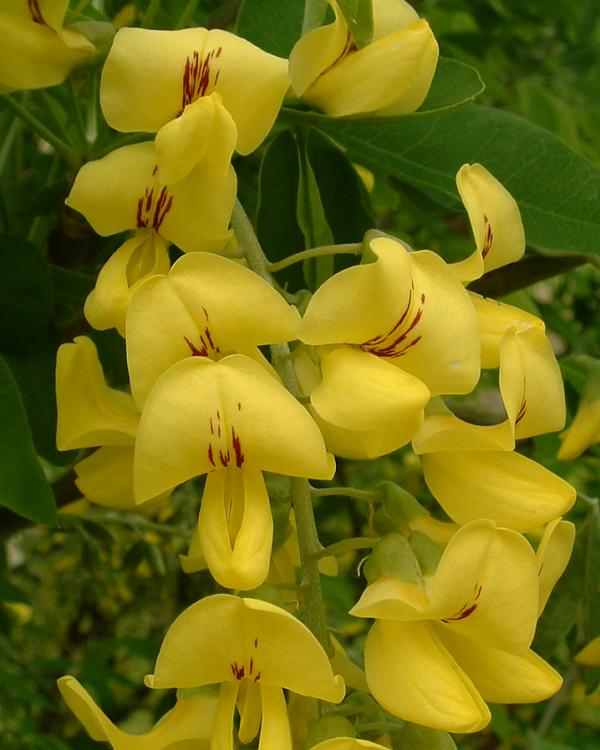
Giardino Montano dell' Orecchiella
