= Tellini =

Tellini may refer to:

== People ==
- Enrico Tellini, Italian General whose assassination was linked to the Corfu Incident.
- Piero Tellini, Italian screenwriter

== Other ==
- Tellini Affair, a term used to refer to the Corfu incident.
