= Alfieri (disambiguation) =

Alfieri is an Italian surname. It may also refer to:

- Alfieri clan, Neapolitan Camorra clan operating on the north-east of Naples
- Magliano Alfieri, commune in the Italian region Piedmont
- Maserati Alfieri, 2+2 grand tourer automobile
- San Martino Alfieri, municipality in the Province of Asti in the Italian region Piedmont
- Teatro Alfieri, Castelnuovo di Garfagnana, 19th-century theatre and opera house in Tuscany, Italy
- Teatro Alfieri, Florence, theatre and opera house in 18th and 19th century Florence
