= San Giuseppe, Castelnuovo di Garfagnana =

Monastery in Castelnuovo di Garfagnana, Italy

Coordinates: 44.112944°N 10.413816°E

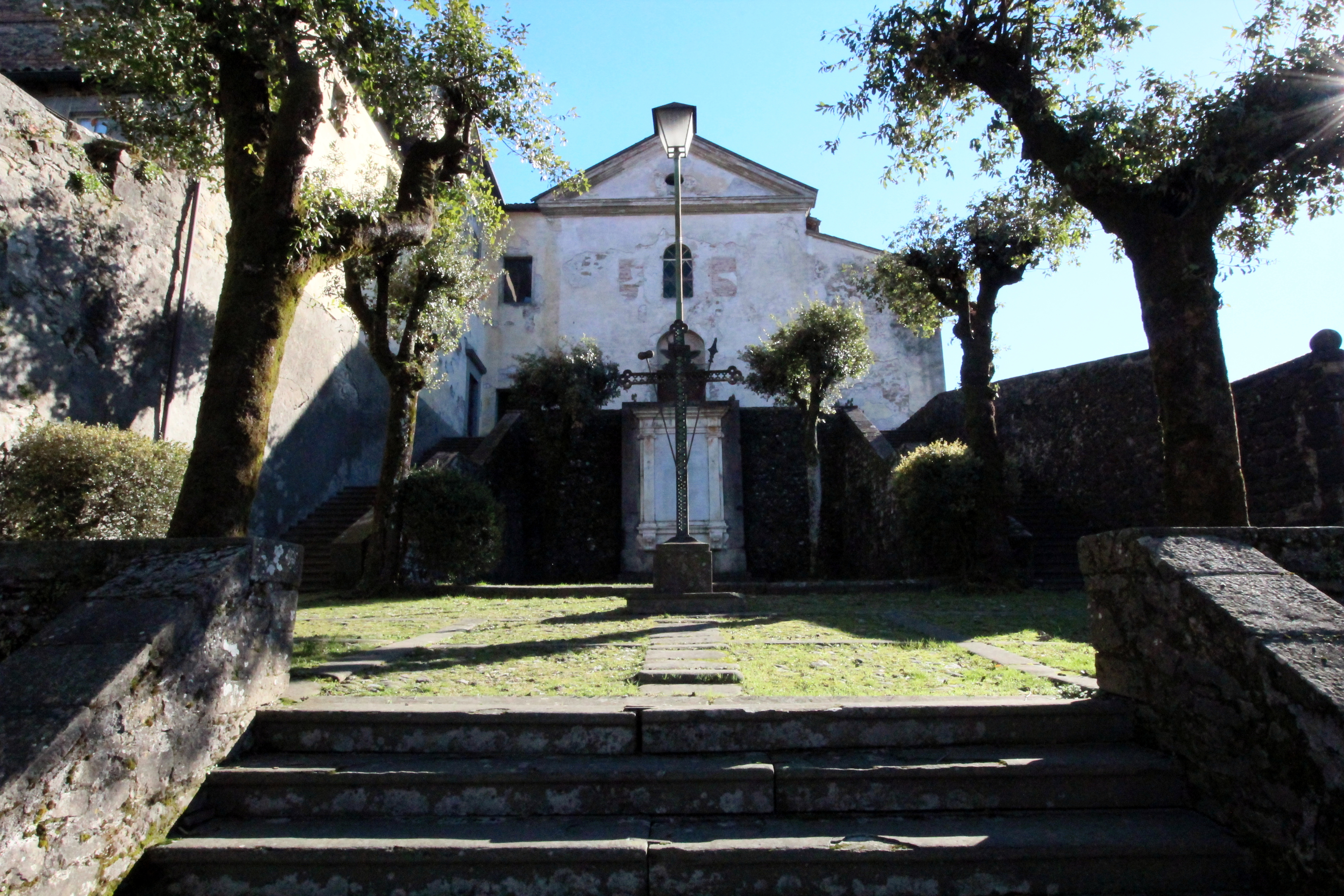
Church and Monastery of San Giuseppe

San Giuseppe is a Baroque-style Roman Catholic Church and monastery in the town of Castelnuovo di Garfagnana, region of Tuscany, Italy.

== History ==
The convent was built in 1632 commissioned by Giambattista d'Este, formerly Alfonso III d'Este, Duke of Modena, who had abandoned his title to enter the Capuchin order. He died in the convent in 1644 and his funeral monument is found inside the church.
