= Alfieri =

Alfieri is an Italian surname. Notable people with the surname include:

- Alessandro Alfieri (born 1972), Italian politician
- Anastase Alfieri (1892–1971), Italian entomologist
- Andrés Charadia Alfieri (born 1966), Argentine hammer thrower
- Benedetto Alfieri (1700–1767), Italian architect
- Carmine Alfieri (born 1943), Italian Camorra boss
- Cesare Alfieri di Sostegno (1799–1869), Italian politician and diplomat
- Dino Alfieri (1886–1966), Italian fascist politician
- Edoardo Alfieri (1913–1998), Italian sculptor
- Blessed Enrichetta Alfieri (1891–1951) - Italian Roman Catholic professed religious
- Francesco Alfieri, 17th-century master of swordsmanship
- Giulio Alfieri (1924–2002), Italian automobile engineer
- Joe Alfieri (...), American politician
- Martino Alfieri (1590–1641), Apostolic Nuncio to Cologne from 1634 to 1639
- Nick Alfieri (born 1992), American football linebacker
- Pietro Alfieri (1801–1863), Roman Catholic priest and Camaldolese monk
- Richard Alfieri (born 1948), American playwright, screenplay writer, novelist, producer, and actor
- Victor Alfieri (born 1971), American actor and writer
- Vittorio Alfieri (1749–1803), Italian dramatist and poet
- Vittorio Luigi Alfieri (1863–1918), Italian military officer

== See also ==
- Alfieri (disambiguation)
