= Castelnuovo di Garfagnana =

- Comune
- Comune di Castelnuovo di Garfagnana
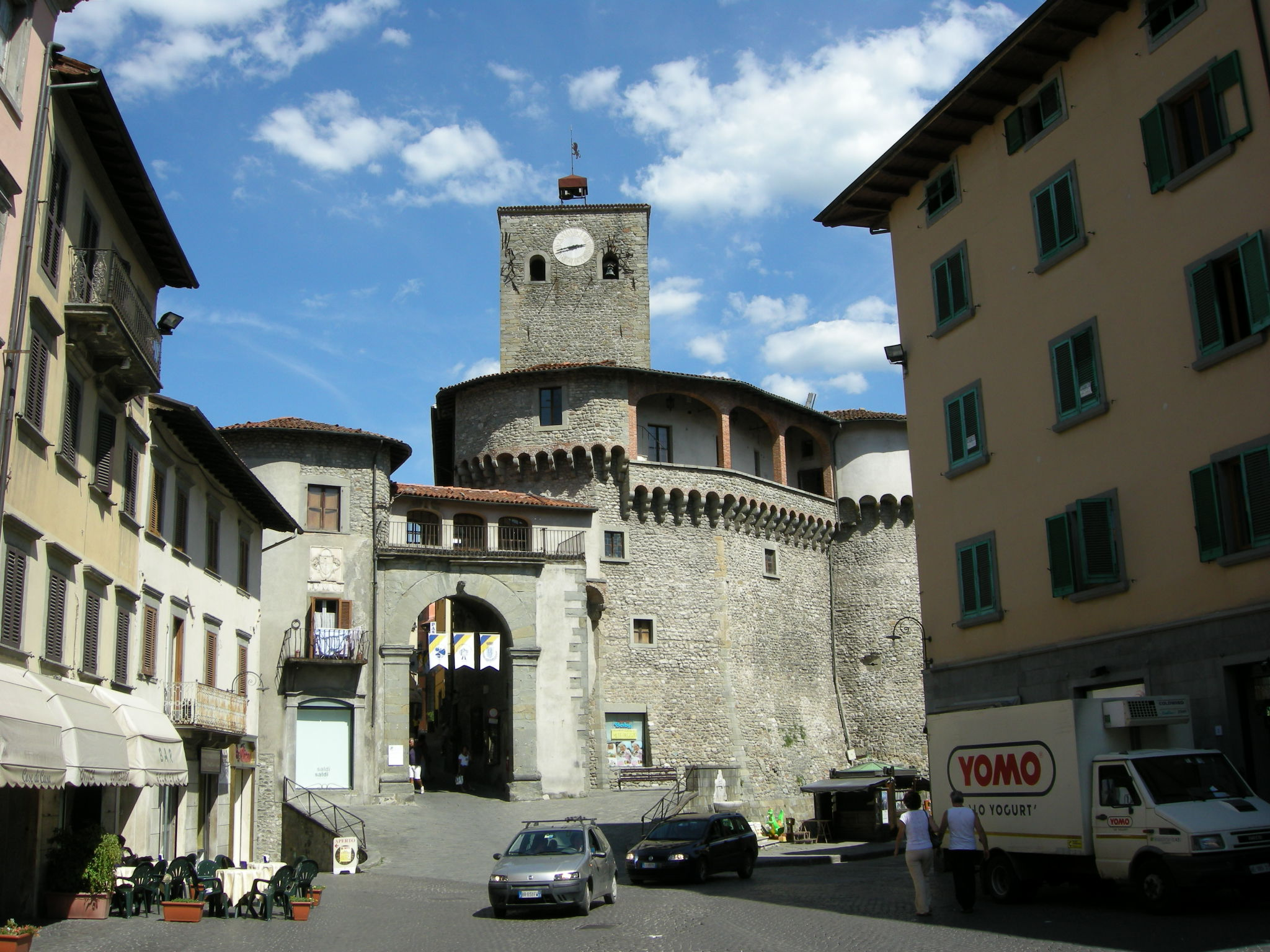

- Coat of arms

- Location within Italy Location within Tuscany
- Coordinates: 44°07′19″N 10°24′20″E
- Country: Italy
- Region: Tuscany
- Province: Lucca (LU)
- Frazioni: Antisciana, Cerretoli, Colle, Gragnanella, La Croce, Metello, Monteperpoli, Monterotondo, Palleroso, Rontano, Stazzana

Government
  - Mayor: Andrea Tagliasacchi

Area
  - Total: 28.48 km^{2} (11.00 sq mi)
- Elevation: 270 m (890 ft)

Population (31 March 2017)
  - Total: 5,935
  - Density: 208.4/km^{2} (539.7/sq mi)
- Demonym: Castelnuovesi
- Time zone: UTC+1 (CET)
  - Summer (DST): UTC+2 (CEST)
- Postal code: 55032
- Dialing code: 0583
- Patron saint: Sts. Peter and Paul
- Saint day: June 29
- Website: Official website

Castelnuovo di Garfagnana is a town and comune (municipality) in the province of Lucca, Tuscany, central Italy. It is the capital of the historical region of Garfagnana, at the confluence of the Serchio and the Turrite Secca rivers, close to the intersection of roads passing through the Apennine Mountains and the Apuan Alps.

The local economy is based mainly on the production of cereals and on the chemical and textile industries.

== History ==
The first mention of the locality is in an official document dating back to the 8th century with the name of Castro Novo ("new fortified settlement").

From the 13th century Castelnuovo di Garfagnana developed as a market town due to its position close to rivers which were important trading routes. Later, in the 14th century, it developed under the jurisdiction of the city of Lucca.

In 1316, control of Castelnuovo di Garfagnana was given to Castruccio Castracani, who built a bridge in order to join the castle to the village.

At the beginning of the 15th century the inhabitants of Castelnuovo di Garfagnana rebelled against the domination of Lucca, putting themselves under the protection of the Estensi family of Ferrara in 1430. Under the Este control, the village gained in importance by becoming the first seat of Vicarship and then by building imposing religious buildings such as the cathedral.

In 1512 the town was occupied by troops led by Francesco Maria I della Rovere, Duke of Urbino, and a few years later it was conquered by the Republic of Florence, the latter, holding the town under its control for just a few years. In the following years the House of Este returned to power; their domination lasting up to the invasion of the territory by the French army led by Napoleon Bonaparte.

During French domination, Castelnuovo and the territories of the Apuan Alps became part of the Cisalpine Republic.

After the collapse of the Napoleonic Empire, in 1814 it was given back to the Estensi who ruled it until the Unification of Italy in 1861.

== Main sights ==
- The Rocca Ariostesca (Ariosto's Castle), dating to the 12th century and enlarged by Castruccio Castracani in the following century. It takes its name from the Italian poet, who resided here in 1522–25 when he was governor of the Garfagnana for the House of Este. It is now home to an archaeological museum.
- The Duomo (Cathedral) of Sts. Peter and Paul, erected in the 16th century. The façade is in Renaissance style, while the interior is Baroque. It includes a terracotta attributed to Andrea del Verrocchio and a canvas by Domenico Ghirlandaio depicting the Madonna with Saints.
- San Giuseppe, the Capuchin monastery
- Fortress of Monte Alfonso, built in the late 16th century by the Estensi as their last stronghold before the Republic of Lucca
- Parco dell'Orecchiella, a nature park and botanical garden
- San Giuseppe, 17th Roman Catholic century church and monastery
- Teatro Alfieri

== Notable people ==
- Enrico Tellini (1871–1923), Italian General
- Paolo Andreucci (born 1965), professional rally driver
- Giovanni Di Lorenzo (born 1993), professional footballer
- Jasmine Paolini (born 1996), professional tennis player

== See also ==
- Garfagnana

== Sister cities ==
- Dronero, Italy
- Marciana, Italy
