= Arese =

- Comune
- Città di Arese
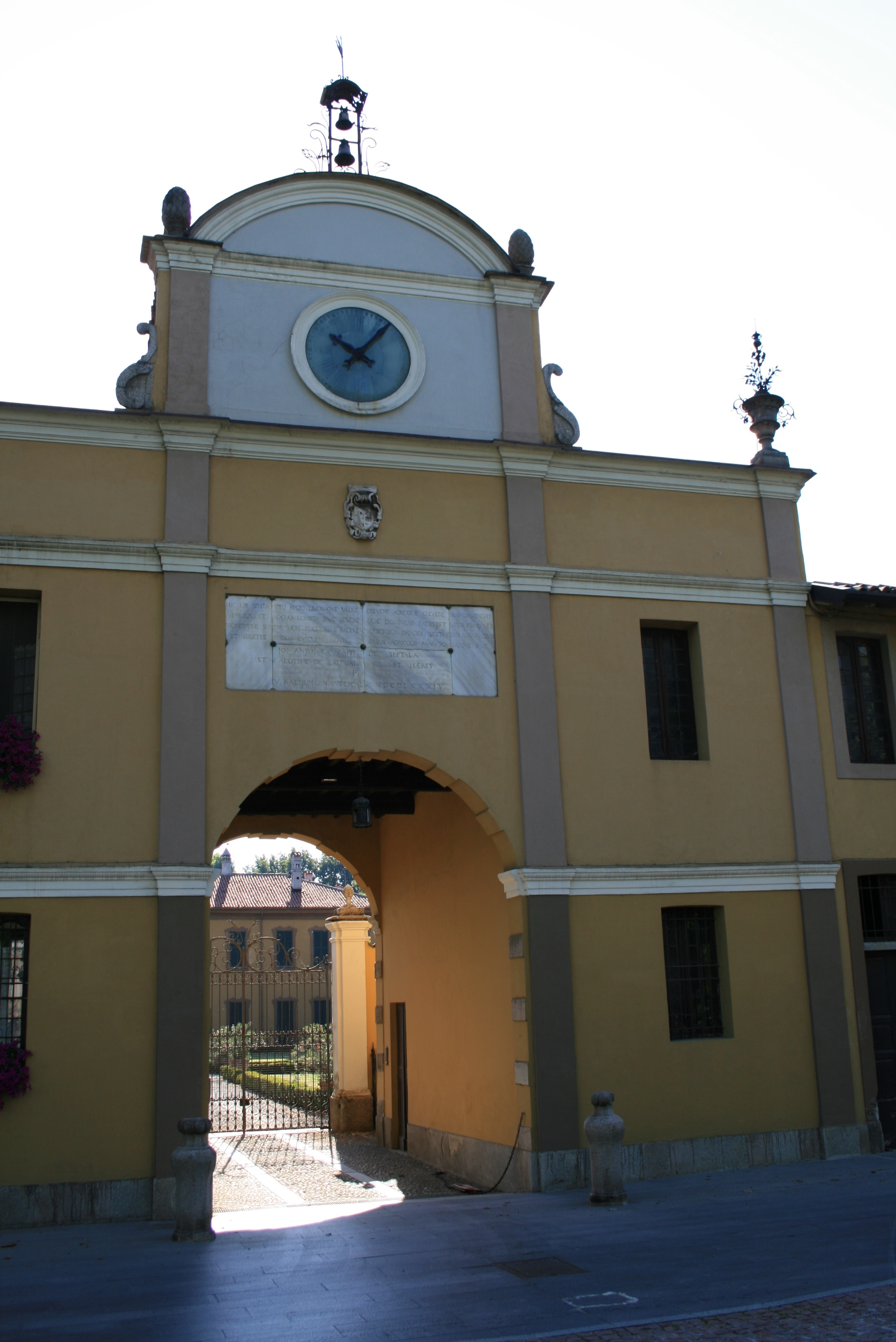
- Villa Ricotti, Arese

- Coat of arms

- Location within Italy Location within Lombardy
- Coordinates: 45°33′N 9°4′E
- Country: Italy
- Region: Lombardy
- Metropolitan city: Milan (MI)
- Frazioni: Valera

Government
  - Mayor: Luca Nuvoli

Area
  - Total: 6.5 km^{2} (2.5 sq mi)
- Elevation: 160 m (520 ft)

Population (26/05/2026)
  - Total: 19.541
  - Density: 3.0/km^{2} (7.8/sq mi)
- Demonym: Aresini
- Time zone: UTC+1 (CET)
  - Summer (DST): UTC+2 (CEST)
- Postal code: 20044
- Dialing code: 02
- Patron saint: Ss. Pietro e Paolo
- Saint day: 29/06
- Website: Official website

Arese (Lombard: Ares [aˈreːs]) is a comune (municipality) in the Metropolitan City of Milan in the Italian region Lombardy, about 12 kilometres (7 mi) northwest of Milan.

Arese borders the following municipalities: Lainate, Garbagnate Milanese, Bollate, Rho, Milan.

Arese was awarded the honorary title of city by presidential decree of 25 October 1985.

Of particular interest in the historical centre is the Church of St Peter and Paul.

== Alfa Romeo ==
The Technical Center of Alfa Romeo in 2011

Starting in 1960 Arese hosted the main seat of Alfa Romeo, partly in the territories of Lainate and Garbagnate Milanese. After three years of building work the Alfa Romeo Arese Plant began vehicle production in 1963, which would continue for decades, becoming the biggest production facility for Alfa Romeo. The factory became known simply as 'Arese' since most of the industrial area and its main entrance were in this municipality. Following a gradual decrease in production the factory ceased manufacturing in 2005. Today the factory is almost totally closed and abandoned, since the Alfa Romeo owners (FIAT) have almost completely moved design and production to other factories in Italy and abroad. The few remaining employees (about 500) have often demonstrated against their dismissal. At the moment most of the factory buildings are abandoned and the local councils are looking for projects to use the huge area in a proper way, given its location. Arese and the factory are in fact very close to the exhibition centre FieraMilano located in neighbouring Rho.

=== Historical Museum ===
One of the few activities still in the old Alfa Romeo factories is the Museo Storico Alfa Romeo, which is in a dedicated building of great architectural value. In early 2011 Fiat announced the closure of the museum for renovations after the Ministry for Cultural Activities had declared the building and the collection of national cultural interest at the request of the municipality of Arese. After four years the museum officially reopened in June 2015.

== Modern Arese ==
The city of Arese is highly residential, with a large number of condominiums and other housing developments. A large number of parks and playgrounds are complemented by a numerous key services. To the North of the city is the Giada shopping centre, built around a large square and comprising a large hotel, shops and bars. In the centre of the city are two main squares around which can be found bars, shops and a Cinema. The city also has a large communal sports centre comprising a wide range of indoor and outdoor facilities and the home of the local Arese football club.

== Twin towns ==
Arese is twinned with:

- Mosonmagyaróvár, Hungary (1989)
- Campolieto, Italy (2006)
