= Santi Pietro e Paolo, Castelnuovo di Garfagnana =

Roman Catholic cathedral in Italy

Santi Pietro e Paolo is the Baroque-style Roman Catholic cathedral in the center of the town of Castelnuovo di Garfagnana, region of Tuscany, Italy.

== History ==
The cathedral, dedicated to Saints Peter and Paul, originally was built in the 10th century but the present structure dates to the 16th century and later refurbishments, leaving only traces of the original Romanesque structure. During World War II there was serious damage to the structure. The cathedral still houses important works at art, among them a terracotta altarpiece depicting San Giuseppe attributed to a design by the school of Andrea del Verrocchio, a 15th-century painted Crucifix known as the Black Christ, a canvas depicting a Madonna and Saints by Michele di Ridolfo del Ghirlandaio, and a marble cornice from Civitali's Lucca workshop. Prominently displayed on the front of the dais located in front of the altar is an enigmatic deep bas-relief of a woman holding a book, in a pose that conveys that she is a teacher (see photo).

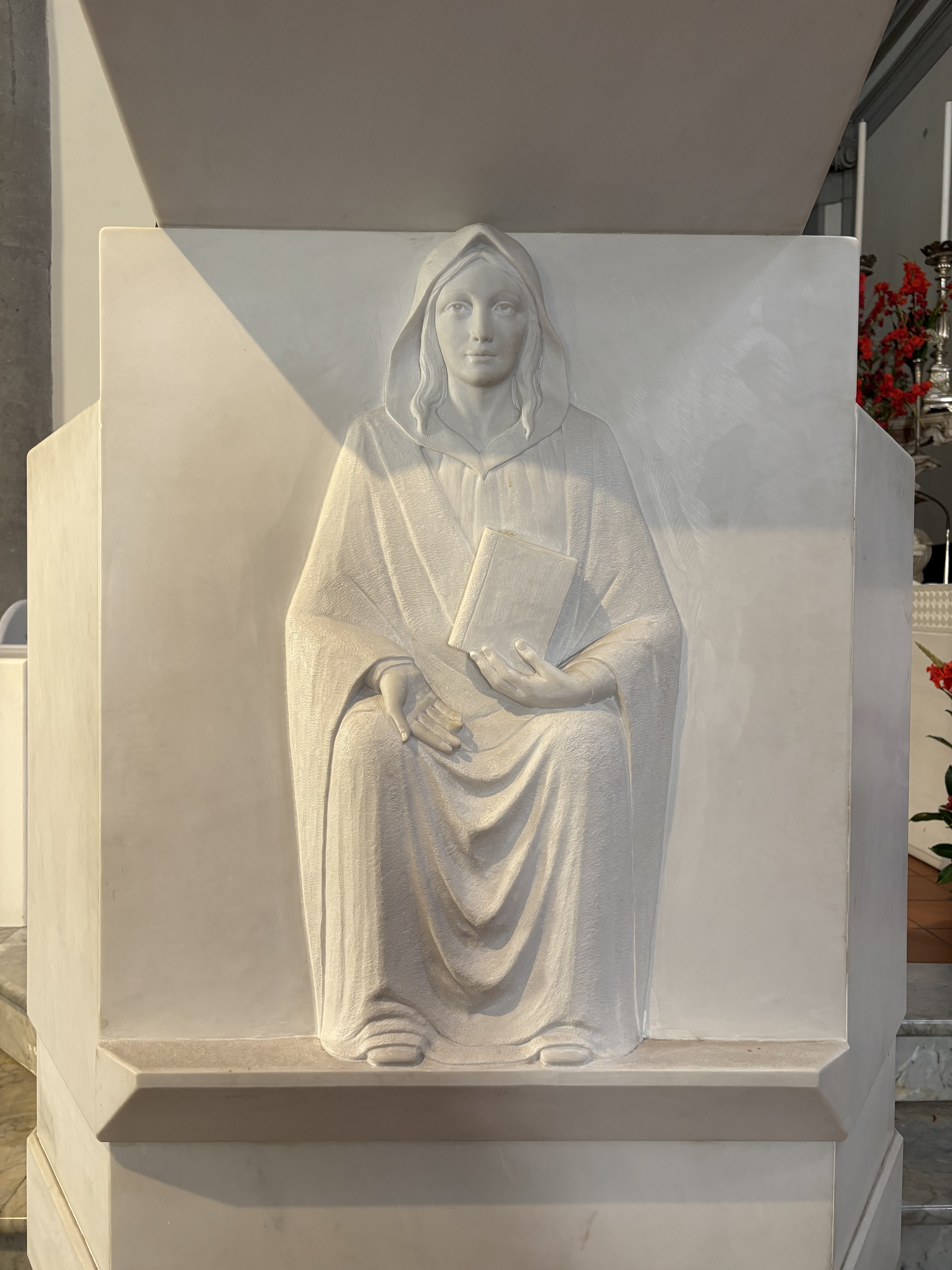
