= Enrico Tellini =

Italian general (1871–1923)

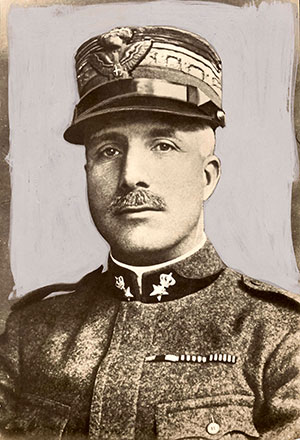
Enrico Tellini

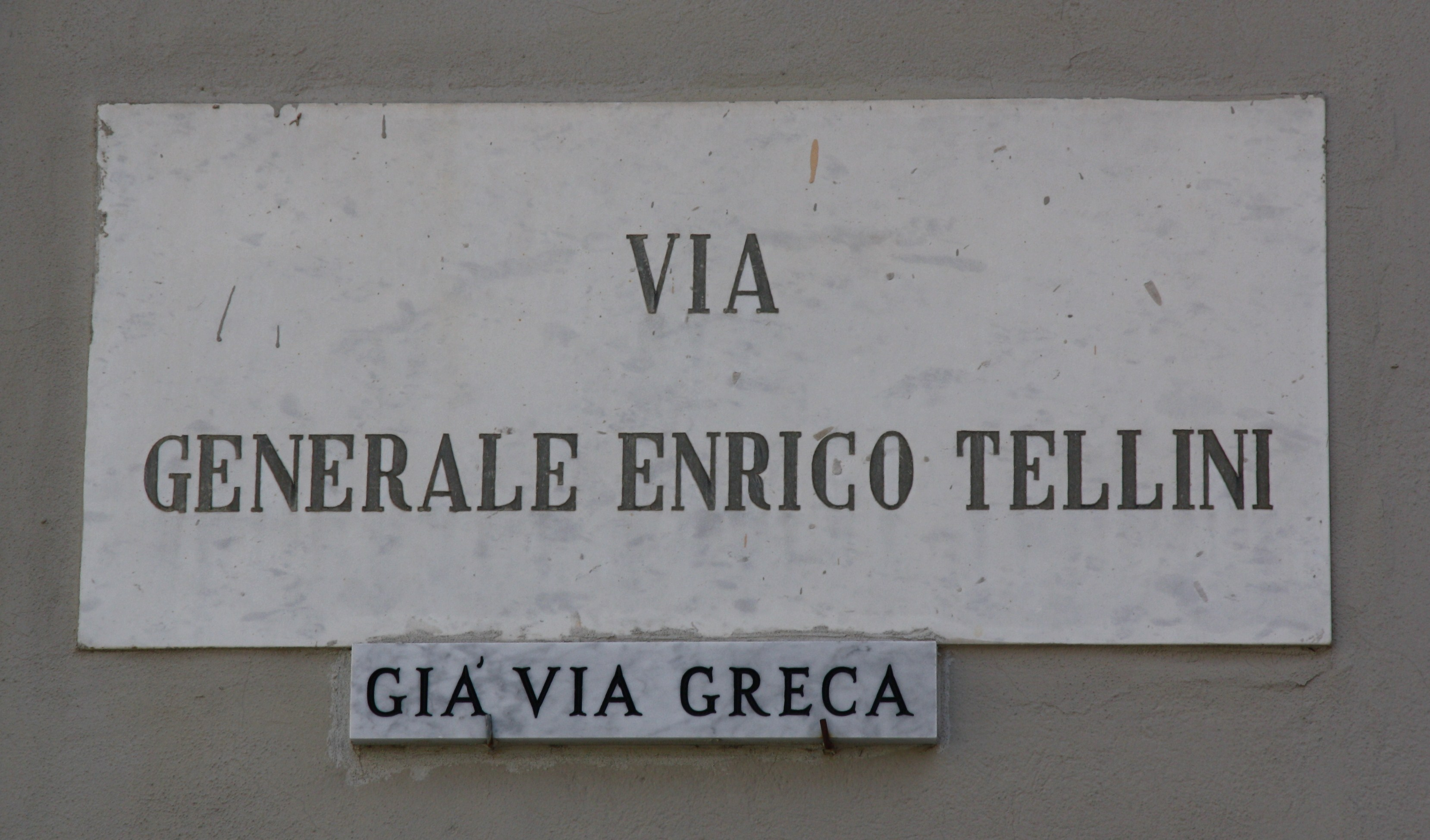
A street in Livorno named after Tellini

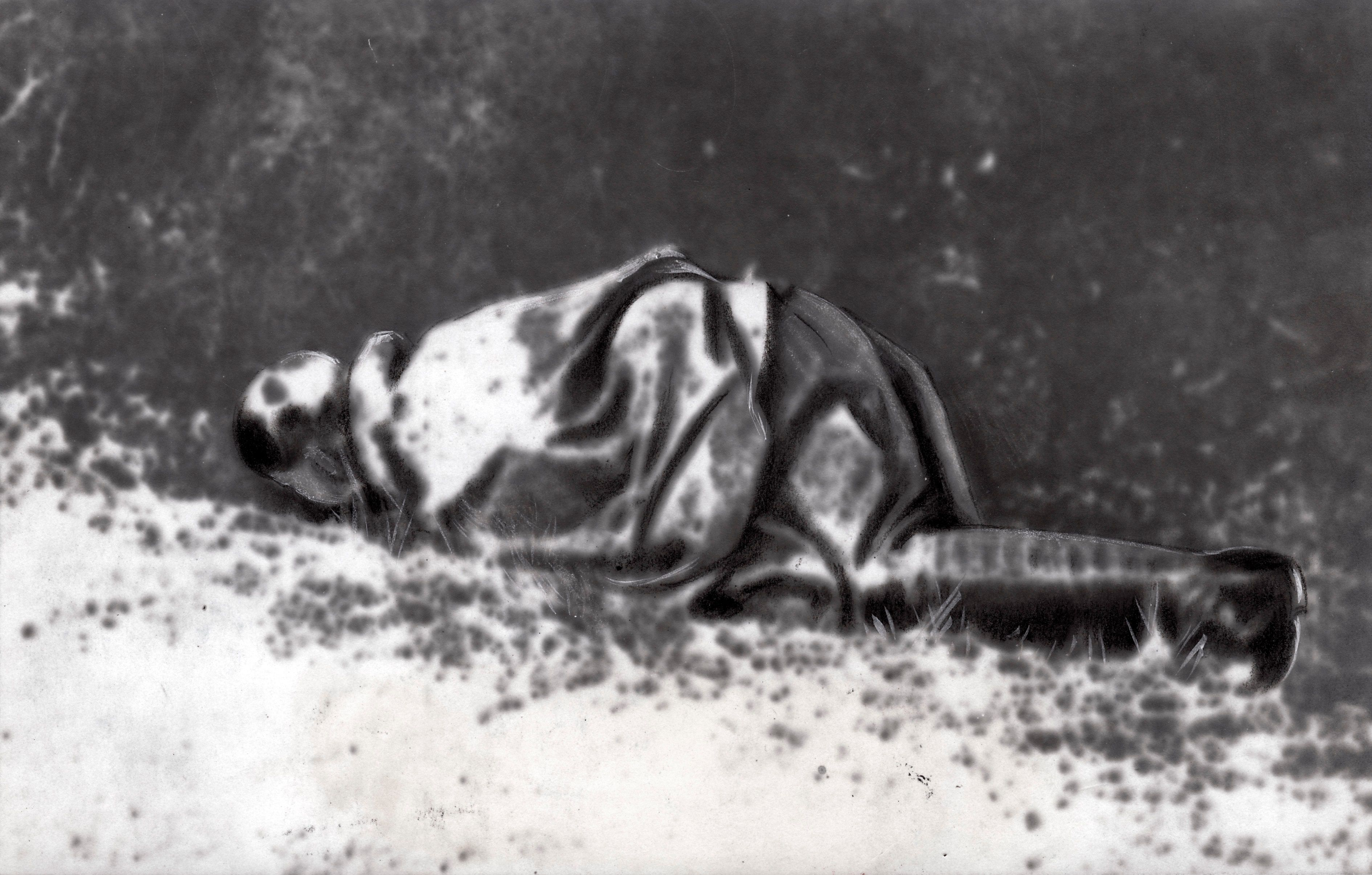
corpse of general Tellini after he was killed near Ioannina

Enrico Tellini (25 August 1871 – 27 August 1923) was an Italian general whose assassination provoked the Corfu incident of 1923.

== Biography ==
Enrico Tellini was born in Castelnuovo di Garfagnana in the province of Lucca in Tuscany. After a childhood in Florence and enlistment in the Italian army he enrolled in classes at a local military college in Florence. In 1901 he was promoted to the rank of major. He participated in the Italo-Turkish War and during the First World War held various posts until he was badly wounded and captured in the battle of Caporetto. After the end of the hostilities, he commanded Italian troops in Albania.

== Assassination ==
In 1923, Tellini was part of an Italian delegation sent by the League of Nations to survey the disputed border between Greece and Albania. He was shot and killed, along with four companions, when the car he was driving in was stopped by a fallen tree across the road that ran along the disputed border near the town of Ioannina on the way to the Albanian border. The responsible persons were never found. The incident occurred close to the disputed border and could have been carried out by either side. However, the Italians under Benito Mussolini, blamed the Greek side. The Greek side refused any responsibility. The Italians claimed Greece as responsible and there were anti-Greek retaliations in the country. The Greek government denied responsibility and blamed Albanian bandits in the area. Benito Mussolini demanded 50 million lira in reparations from Greece and the execution of the assassins. On 31 August 1923 Italian troops occupied Corfu in the Corfu incident.

The Romanian consul in Ioannina attributed the murder to Albanians. After the Italian occupation of Greece, Italian authorities conducted research into the Greek government's archives and uncovered no evidence to link the Greek government, either directly or indirectly, with Tellini's murder. Reginald Leeper, the British ambassador at Athens in 1945, in a letter to the British Foreign Secretary in April 1945 mentioned that the Greeks that lived in Albania blame Cham Albanians for the murder of Tellini.

In light of recent evidence, it is generally agreed that the Greek government was correct in assuming that the crime was carried out by Albanians, as Albanian bandits were active in the area since 1921, and since Tellini had several Albanians, including notables, executed during his service in Vlorë, just before the Vlorë War.

== Recognition ==
In Përmet, a street at the entrance to the Italian barracks was named "Enrico Tellini" by Decision No. 93 of the Municipal Council of Përmet on 3 December 2021.
