= Teatro Alfieri, Castelnuovo di Garfagnana =

Coordinates: 44°6′45.35″N 10°24′44.53″E

The Teatro Alfieri is a 19th-century theatre and opera house in the town of Castelnuovo di Garfagnana, region of Tuscany, Italy.

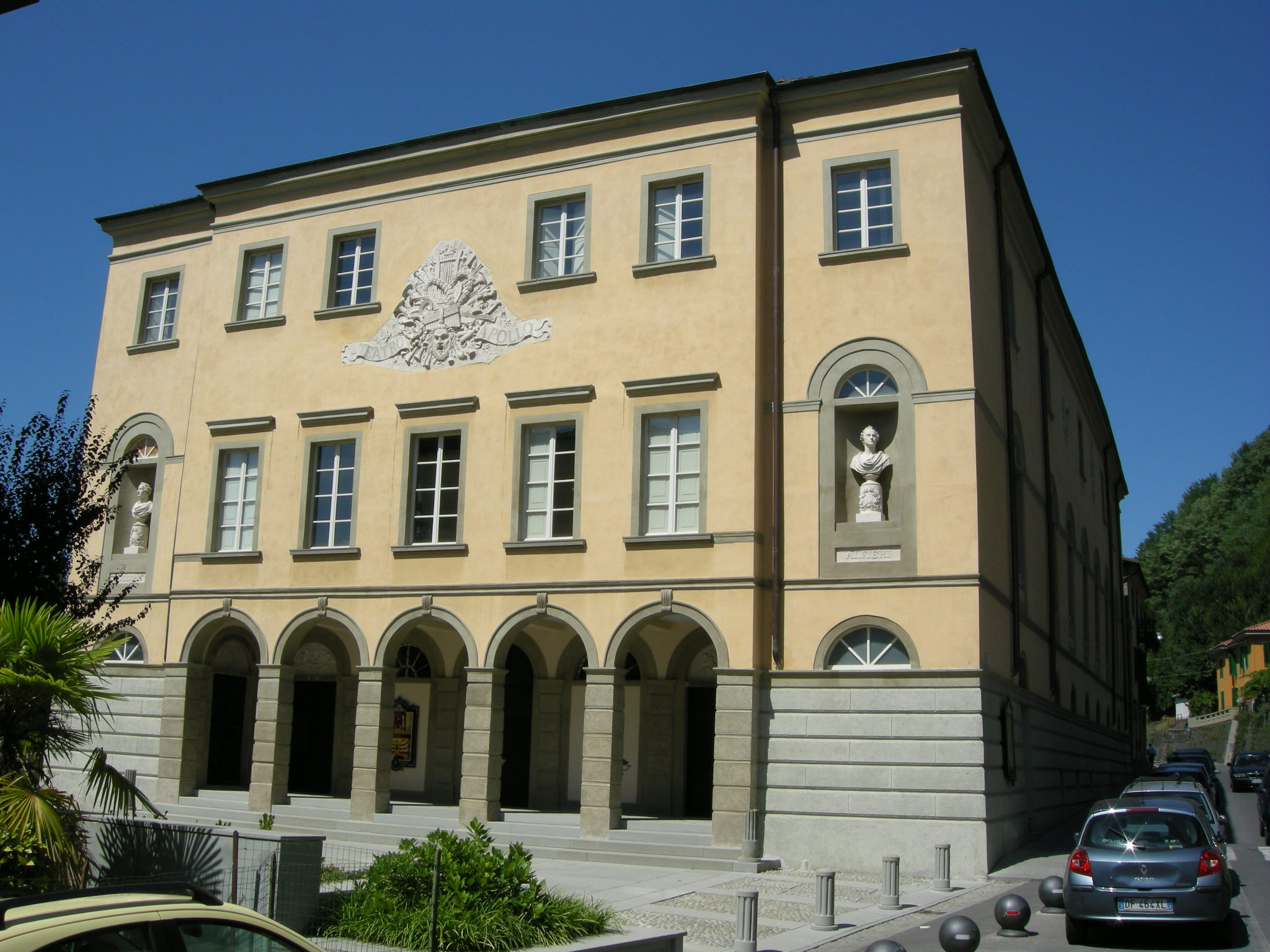
The theatre

The theater was erected in 1860, commissioned by the local Counts Luigi and Giovanni Carli. The latter also aided in the design along with Antonio Vittoni. It was originally dedicated to Vittorio Emanuele II, and it acquired its present name, in honor of the playwright Vittorio Alfieri, following the establishment of the republic after the war. Another Alfieri theater was once found in Florence, and another in Asti. At one time, the theater sponsored regular opera seasons, but then changed to film performances after the War, and finally closed. It was purchased by the Town Council of Castelnuovo, and reopened in 2006.
