= Santi Pietro e Paolo, Arese =

Church in Lombardy, Italy

Santi Pietro e Paolo
- Chiesa Parrocchiale dei Santi Pietro e Paolo
- Parrocchia Ss. Pietro e Paolo
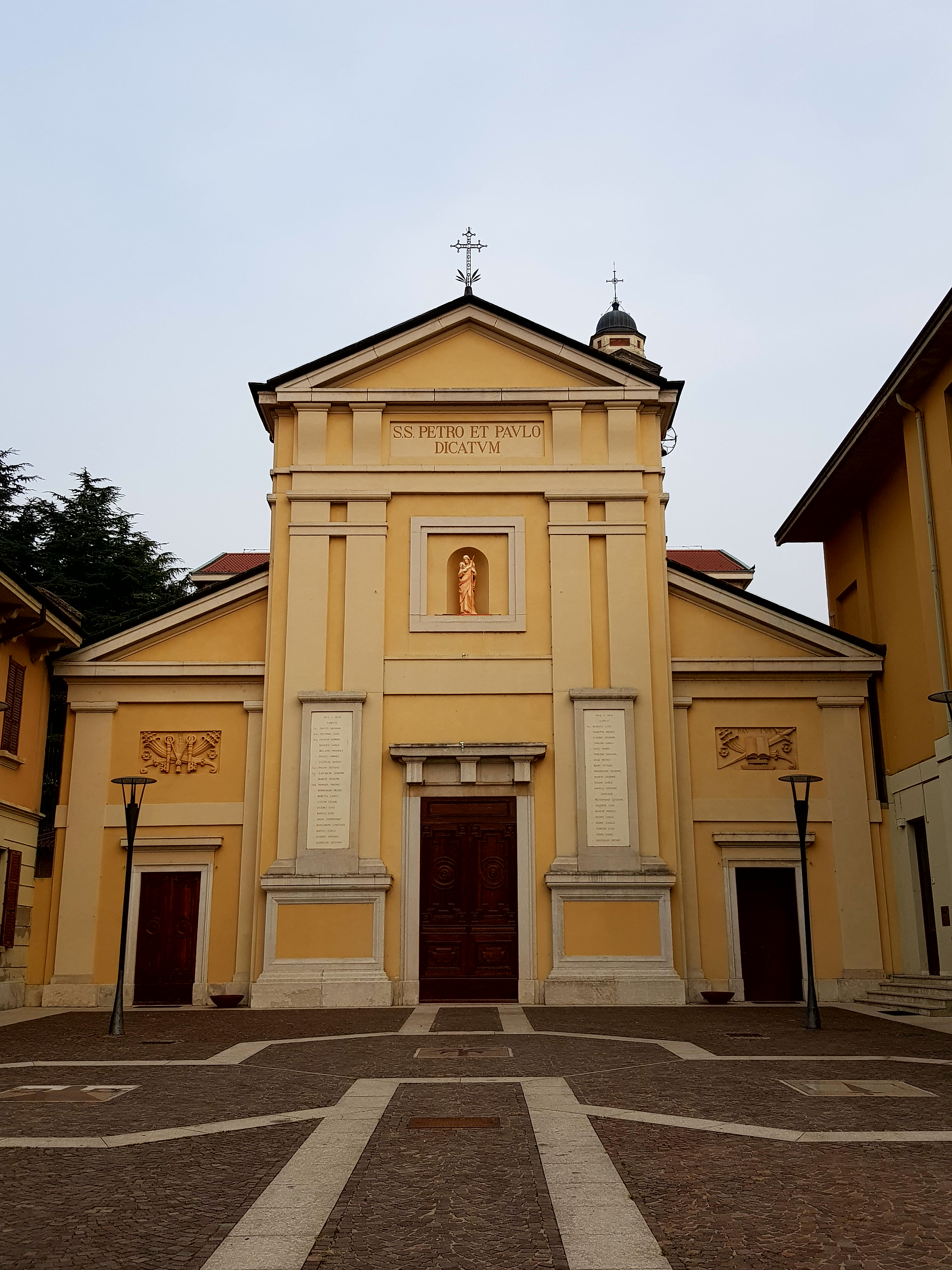
- Front side of the church

- The church is located in the north-western part of Milan. Santi Pietro e Paolo (Italy)
- 45.55153°N 9.07°E
- Location: Arese
- Country: Italy
- Denomination: Catholic

History
- Former name: Ecclesia Sancti Petri
- Status: Church
- Founder: Monsignor Giuseppe Negri

Architecture
- Functional status: Active
- Architect(s): Enrico Strada, Giuseppe Gallazzi, Ugo Zanchetta, Giuseppe Airaghi
- Style: Neo-Renaissance, Neo-classical
- Groundbreaking: 1880
- Completed: 1938
- Construction cost: approximately 60 000 liras

Administration
- Division: Milan
- Province: Milan

Clergy
- Priest: Don Diego

Santi Pietro e Paolo ("St. Peter and Paul", Italian: Chiesa parrocchiale dei Santi Apostoli Pietro e Paolo) is a church located in Arese in Lombardy, Italy. It is dedicated to the Christian figures of Saint Peter and Saint Paul.

It was built to replace the old parish church of Saint Peter (the first church in Arese), which had become too small for the growing community. Construction began in 1880, on the initiative of the local priest Don Enrico Mora. The new church was funded, and blessed, by Monsignor Giuseppe Negri in 1882. The construction of the church was completed in 1938, and underwent re-consecration in 1982, on the occasion of the centenary of the foundation.

== History ==
From the early 17th century, significant regional population growth created issues and inconveniences for church goers attending local religious functions in the city. Many of them were forced to follow the mass from outside the existing building due to the lack of space. As a consequence, the parish priest decided to give the community a larger and more functional church. Due to limited financial resources in the community, three members of the parochial vestry (Carlo Airoldi, Carlo Borghi e Carlo Minola) appointed themselves to raise funds through donations. The majority of financial funds came from local landowners and entrepreneurs who wanted to demonstrate their feelings of attachment towards the community, devotion and loyalty.

The project for the new church was realized and managed by the engineer and architect Enrico Strada. The estimated cost for the work to be completed was 43 049 liras (the old Italian currency). Strada gave custody of the project to the local engineer Giuseppe Gallazzi (from Arese) and to the master builder Giuseppe Airaghi (from Passirana, Rho). Members of the local community also got involved in the project. The new church was completed in 1882 and blessed by Monsignor Giuseppe Negri. The estimated budget was surpassed, and the final cost was about 60 000 liras.

Due to the limited amount of funds available, the church did not match the expectations of a part of the community. For example, the facade (the front of the church) was unfinished, the walls were not decorated, and the windows had no decorative panels. The black marble altar, which was kept from the old church, was out of proportion compared to the extended structure of the new church. More funds were necessary to carry on the project. For these reasons, in 1885, Monsignor Giuseppe Negri donated to the parish an additional 20 000 liras. This donation was used to contribute to the construction of the bell tower, which was completed in 1886, by the engineer Cesare Nava. After the building of the bell tower, a new donation was necessary to substitute the old bells, which did not conform to the church's new structure. The number of bells increased from three to five. Thanks to contributions from the community, the priest collected approximately 15 200 liras and in 1887 the bell tower and its new bells were consecrated.

== Architecture and decorations ==
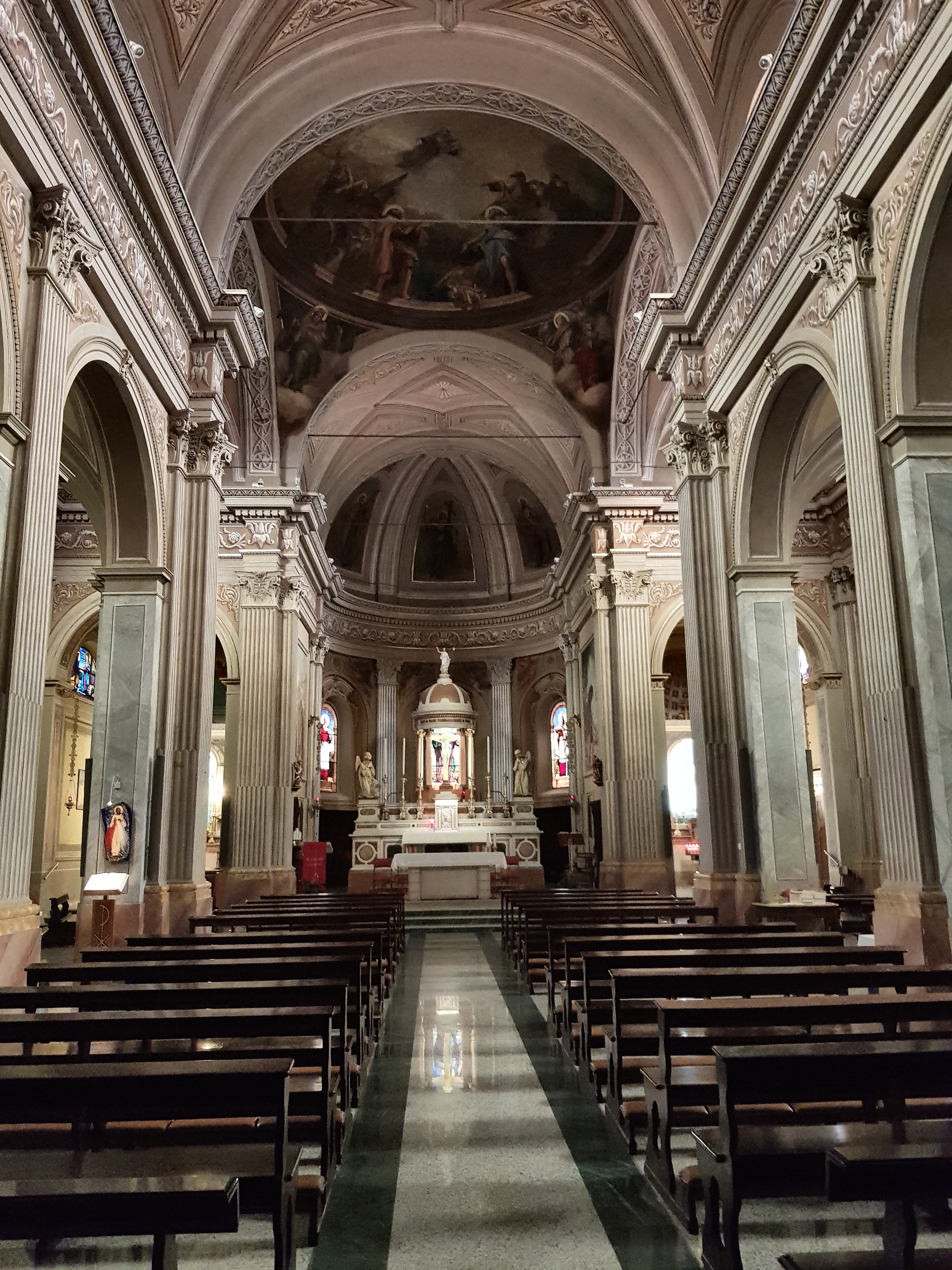
Central Nave of Church of St. Peter and Paul, Arese.

The final decorative and executive project was assigned to the architect Zanchetta, who was inspired by the Neoclassical architecture used in Milan at that time. Zanchetta reused the classical style, inspired by Ancient Greek architecture (especially Doric and Ionic). He studied the ancient architecture and recreated a more modern and authentic style. The building evidences a dramatic use of columns. These were are not used to carry the weight of the building's structure but as a graphical and decorative element. The church has a salient structure and three aisles. The facade is an example of Neoclassical architecture: it is linear, flat, long and does not have any decorations.

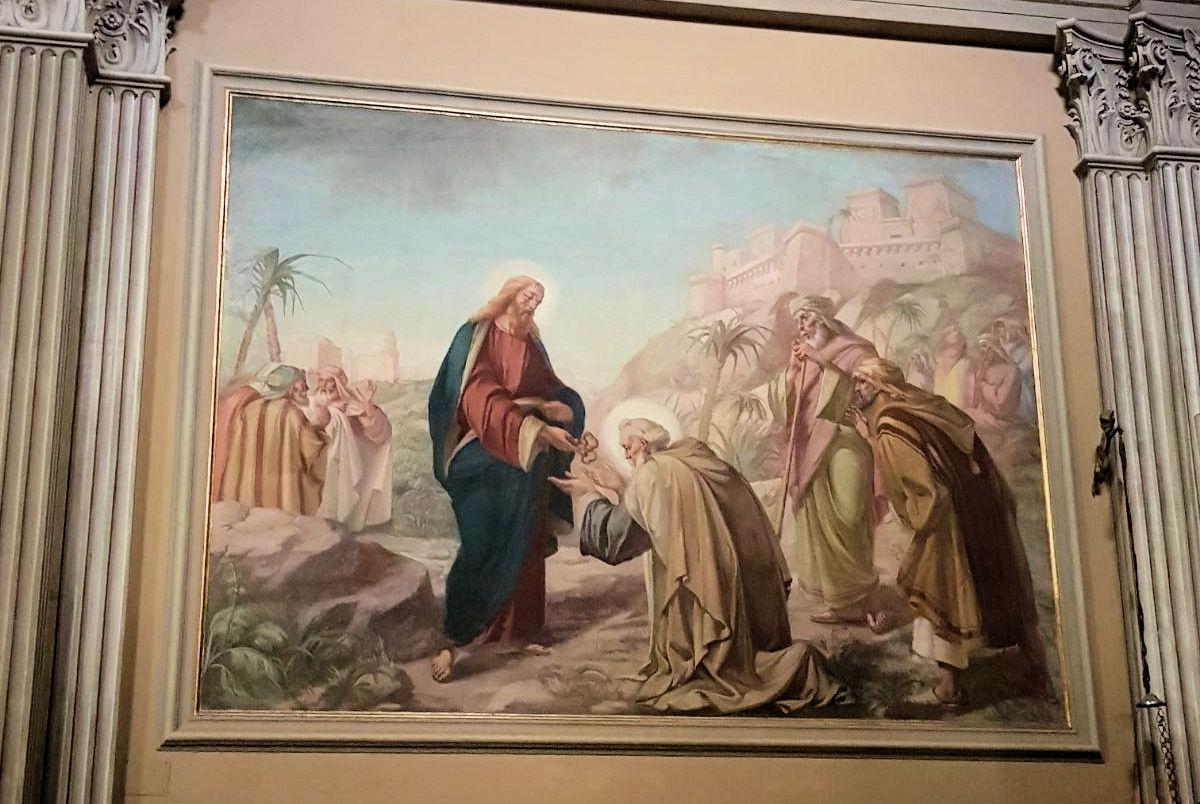
Painting on the left side of the altar of the church.

The church is characterized by a marble altar which was sculpted by a company located in Milan in 1913. This altar is accompanied by two frescoes, made by Mario Grandi Chiodo, representing the Conversion of Paul the Apostle and Jesus handing over the keys to St. Peter. The cupola is decorated with a fresco made by Angelo Galloni in 1938 and represents the Virgin Mary of Mount Carmel, patroness of the Carmelite Order. Of particular interest is a pipe organ which is situated in the counter-front of the church, near the main entrance.

In 1931, the parish priest began dealing with the decorations of the church and conceived the design of the individuals to portray on the walls near the main altar. He consulted famous painters and decorators and allocated the work to Comazzi (from Milan). The parish priest wanted Comazzi to paint two big frescos. Comazzi could not complete the work due to lack of time, and custody of the work was given to another painter, Mario Grandi.

The frescos were completed in July 1931. Don Fedeli was satisfied with the work, but almost four years were necessary to repay the two painters. In 1934, some artistic glass walls were attached to the windows of the church as decorations.

=== The Chapel ===
In 1938, the chapel of the church was finally decorated, based on designs by the parish priest. The large fresco was painted by Gallone (from Milan) who had already painted the walls near the main altar. The cost of the work was approximately 20 000 liras. At the end of the year, when the work was completed, the community began thinking about finishing the construction of the parish church, which had begun 60 years earlier.

== The Square ==
The square in front of the church is called St. Peter and Paul Square (in Italian, Piazza Ss. Pietro e Paolo). It includes buildings from the 8th century, including the reconstructed town castle (now used as council offices), and the old aristocratic “Villa Borghi”, which has become a cloister that houses the town's Salesian nuns order. In front of the square is a winding alley, called St. Anna Road, in which some elements of the old agricultural hamlet are retained. “Villa Galeazzi”, which is located at the end of this narrow street, is an old villa still inhabited by the original family owners. Inside this villa there is a garden that hides a small private chapel.

== Gallery ==
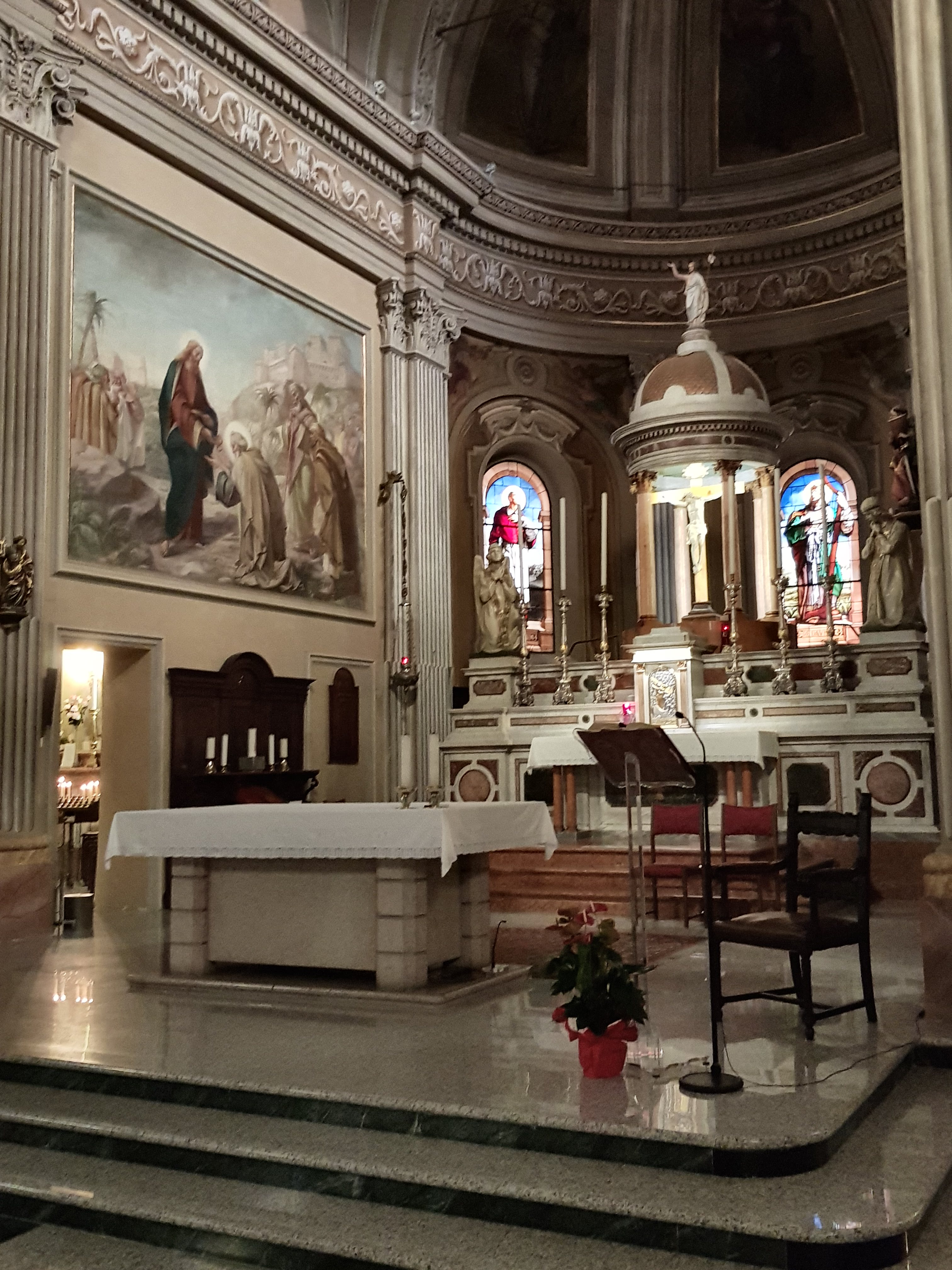
Altar (right) of the Church of St. Peter and Paul, Arese

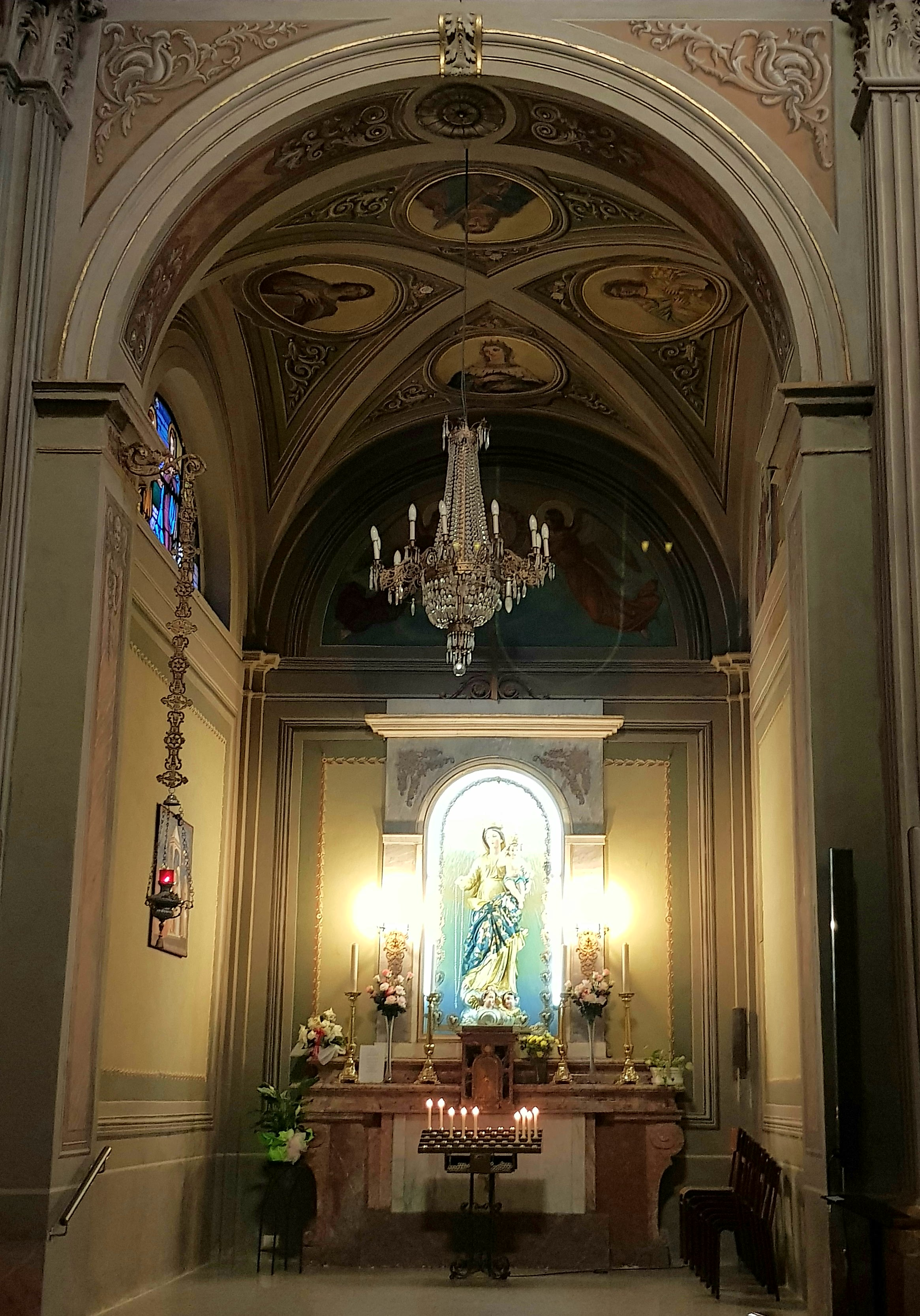
Left Chapel of the Church of St. Peter and Paul, Arese

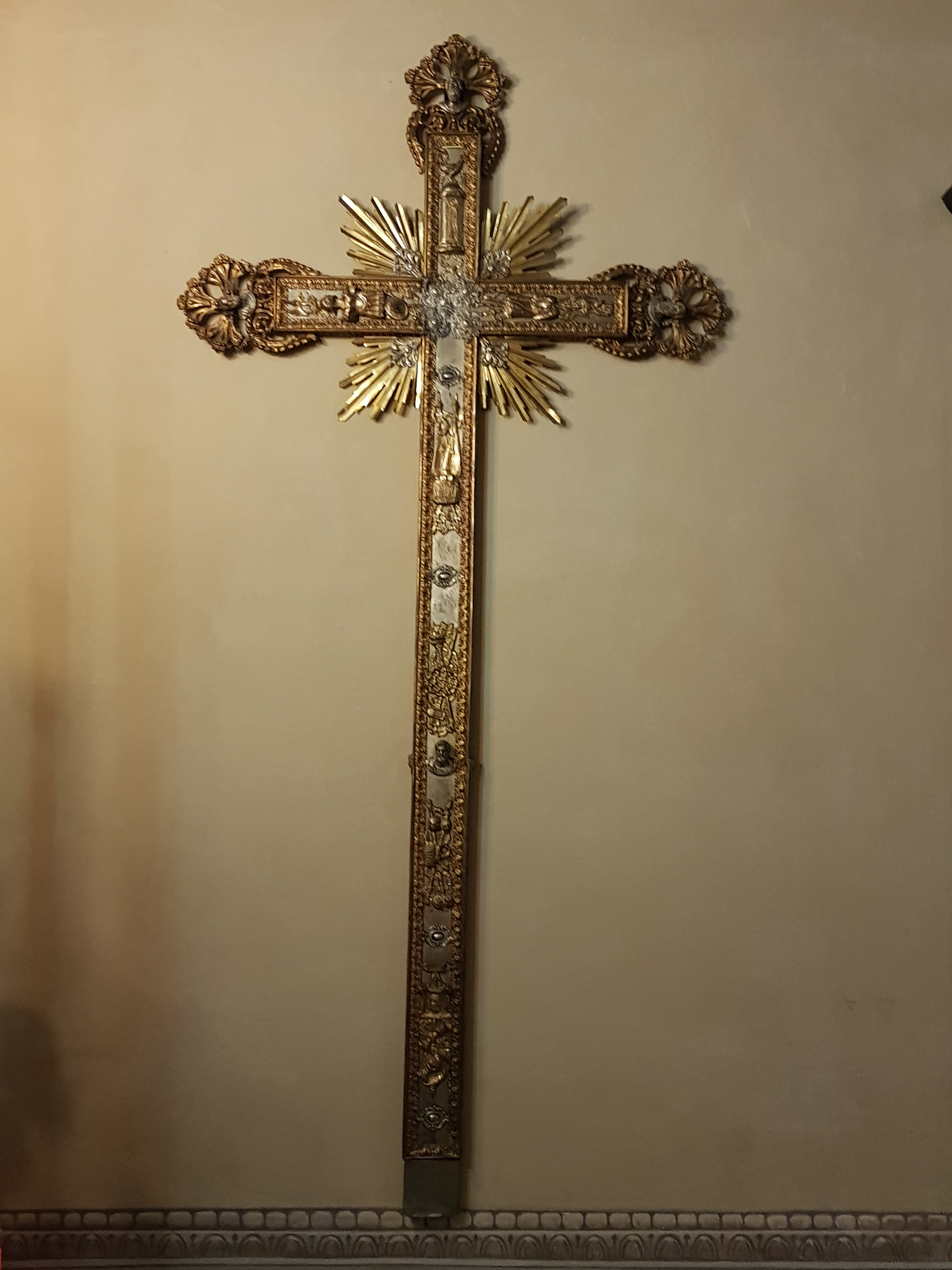
Gold-plated cross in the right chapel of the Church of St. Peter and Paul, Arese

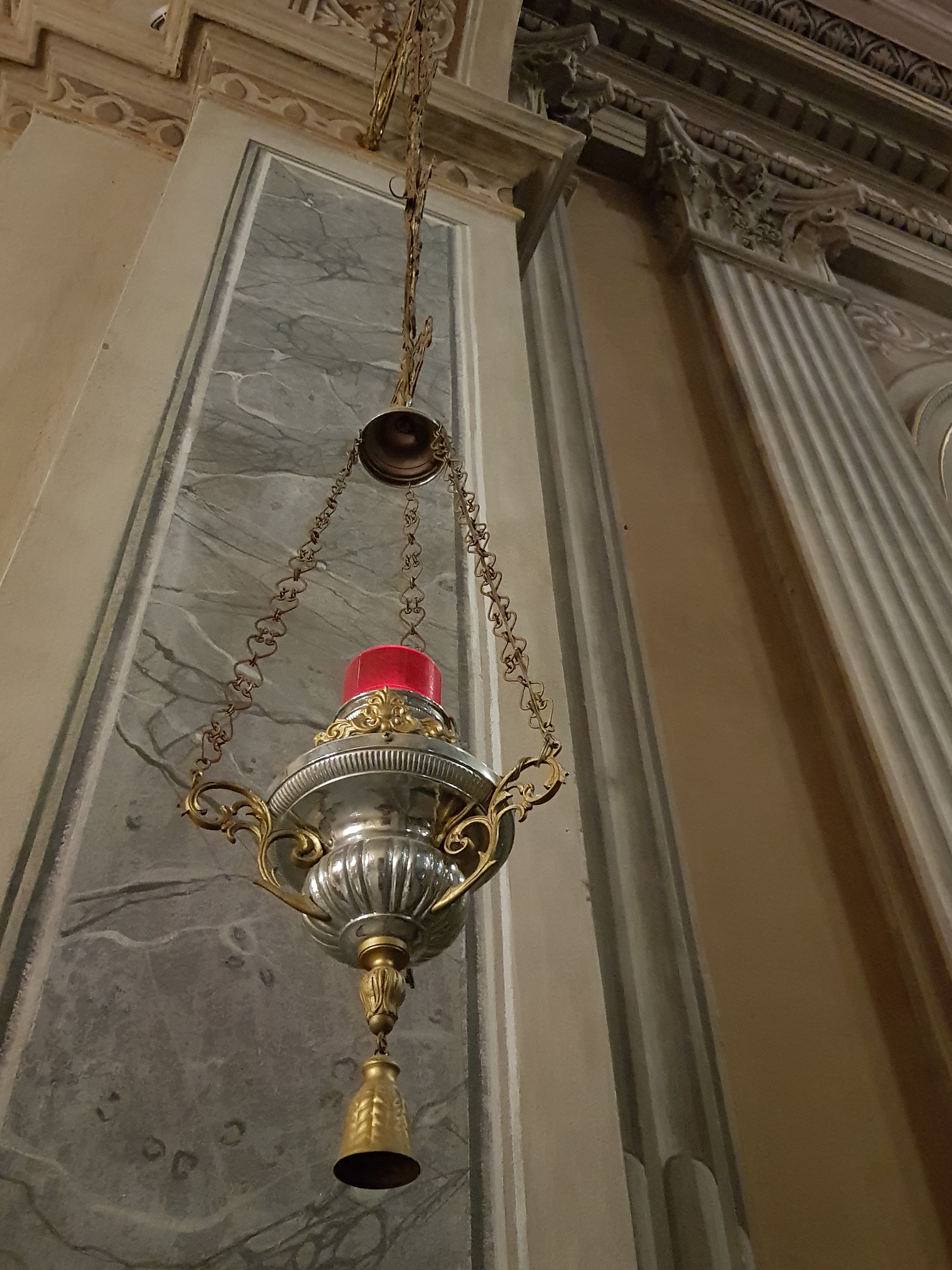
Candel-holder in the right chapel if the Church of St. Peter and Paul, Arese

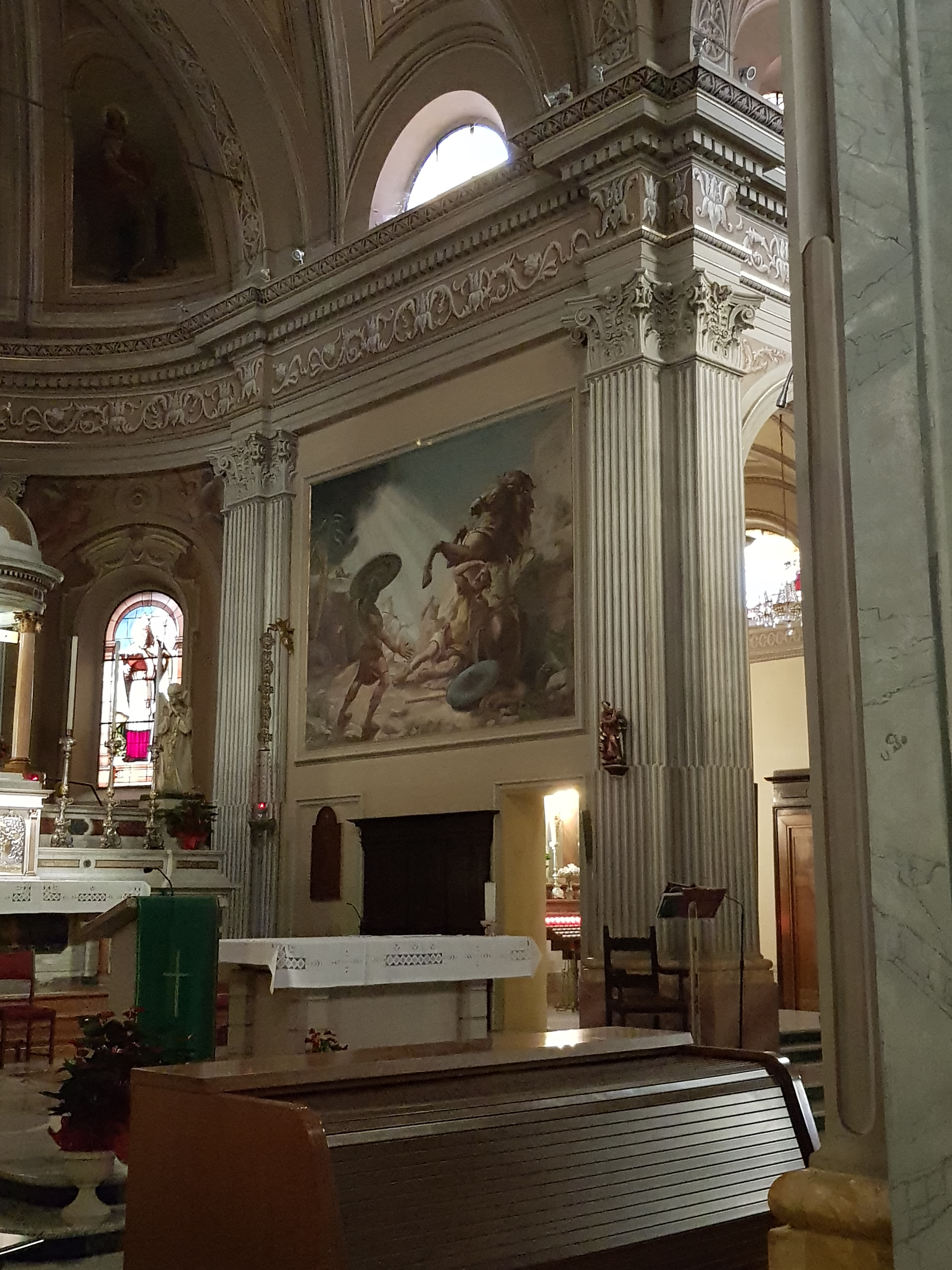
Painting in the right side of the Church of St.Peter and Paul, Arese

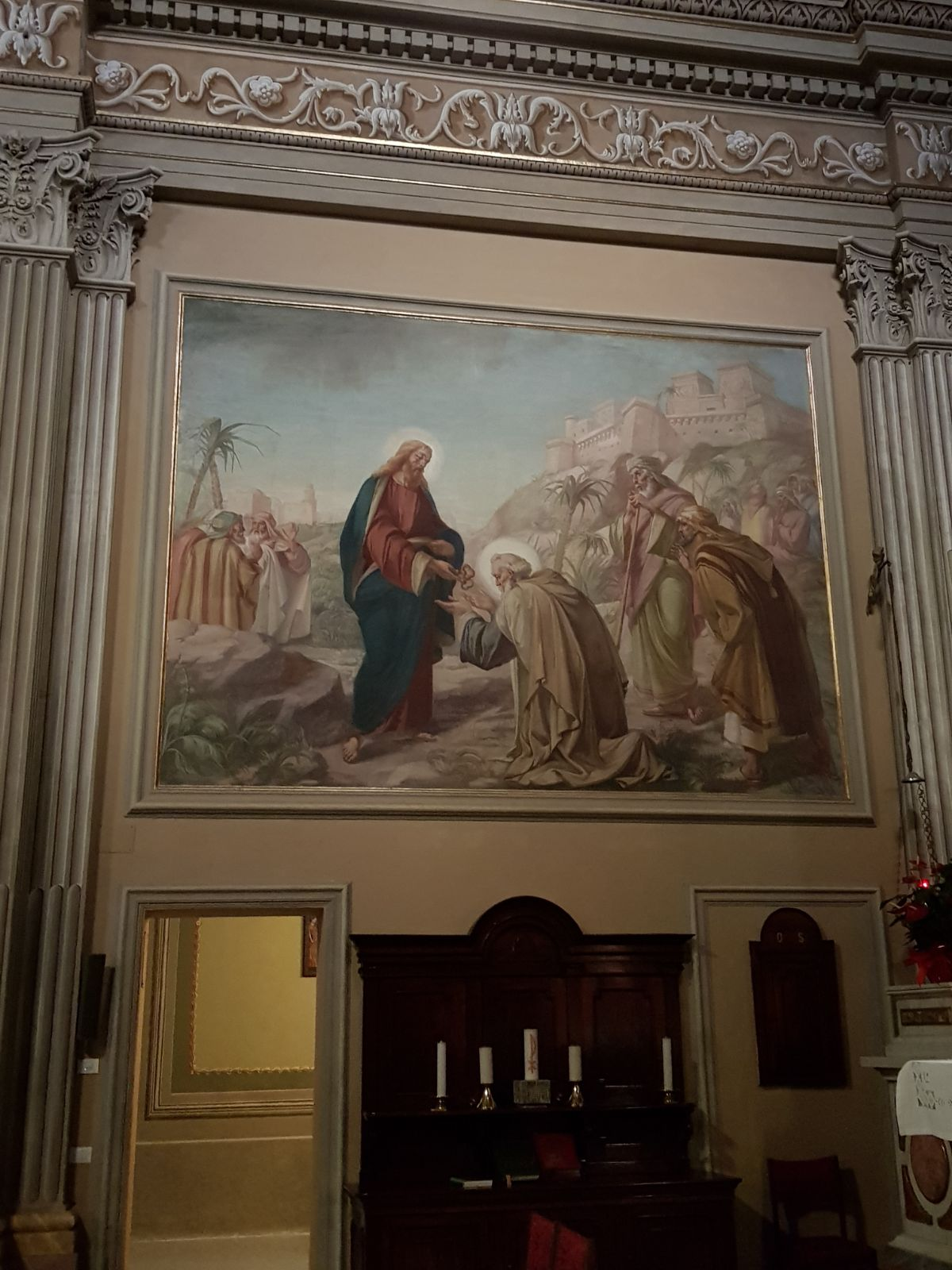
Painting in the left side of the Church of St.Peter and Paul, Arese

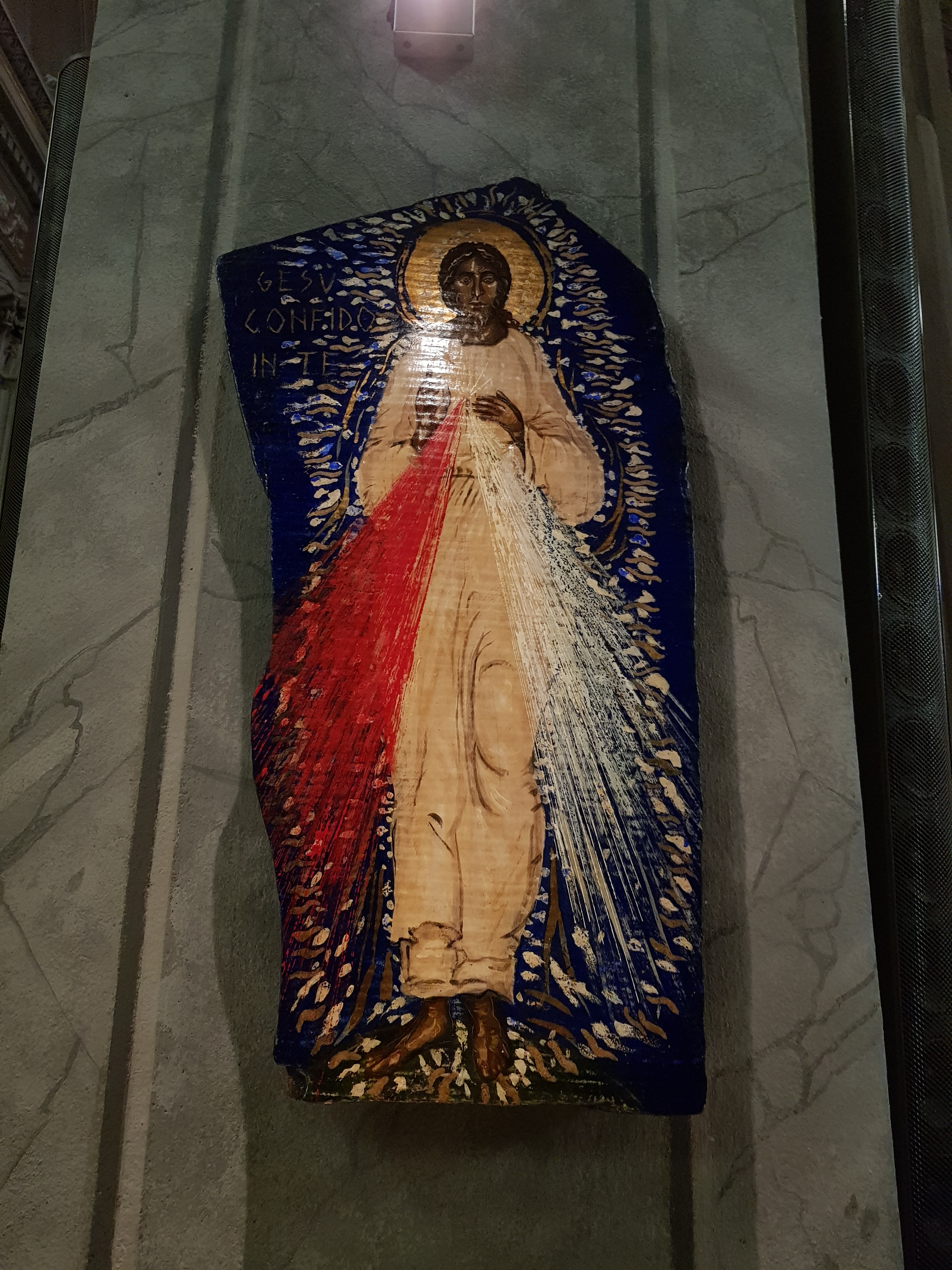
The raffiguration on a colon in the left side of the Church of St.Peter and Paul, Arese

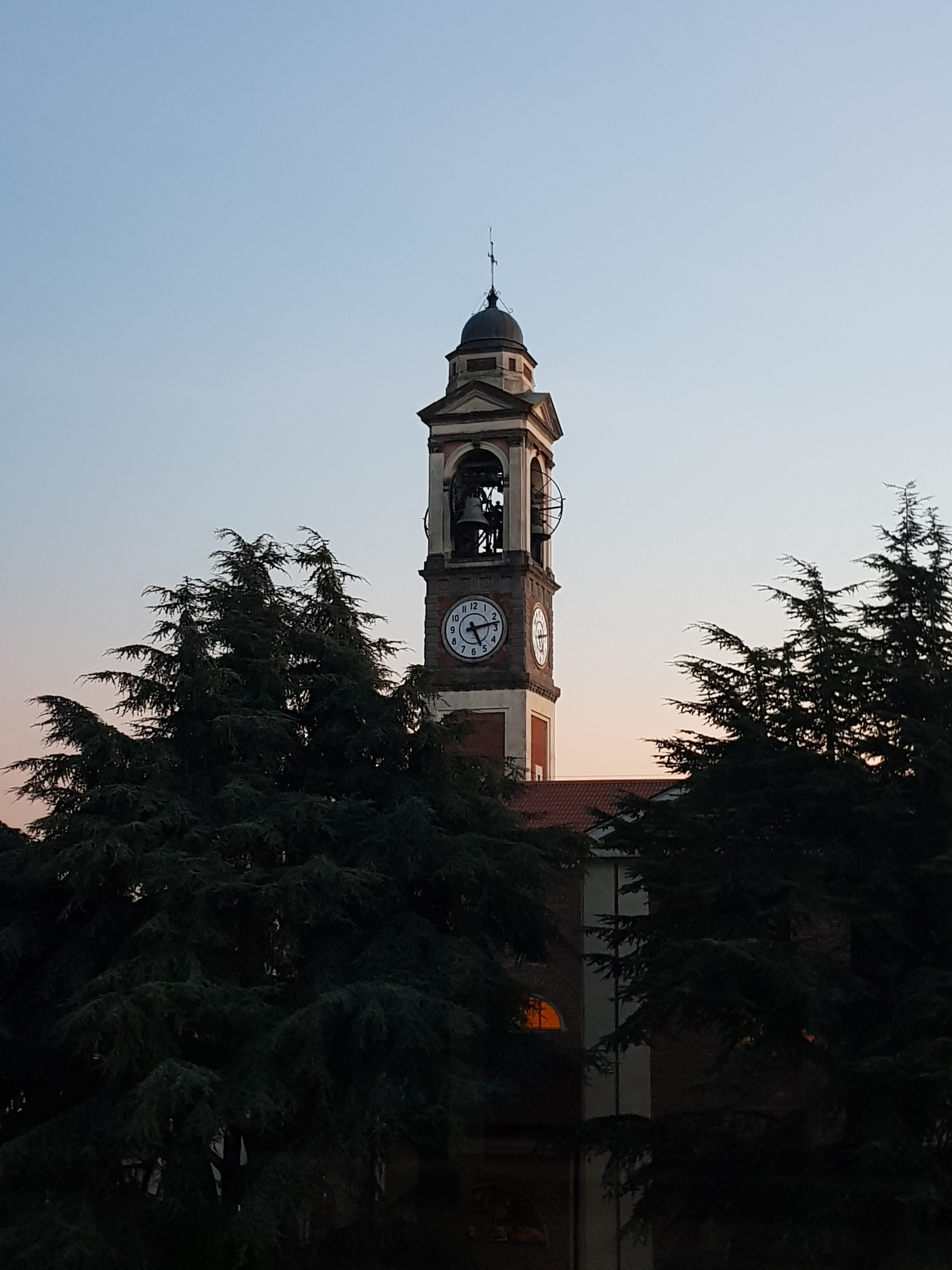
Bell tower of the Church of St.Peter and Paul, Arese

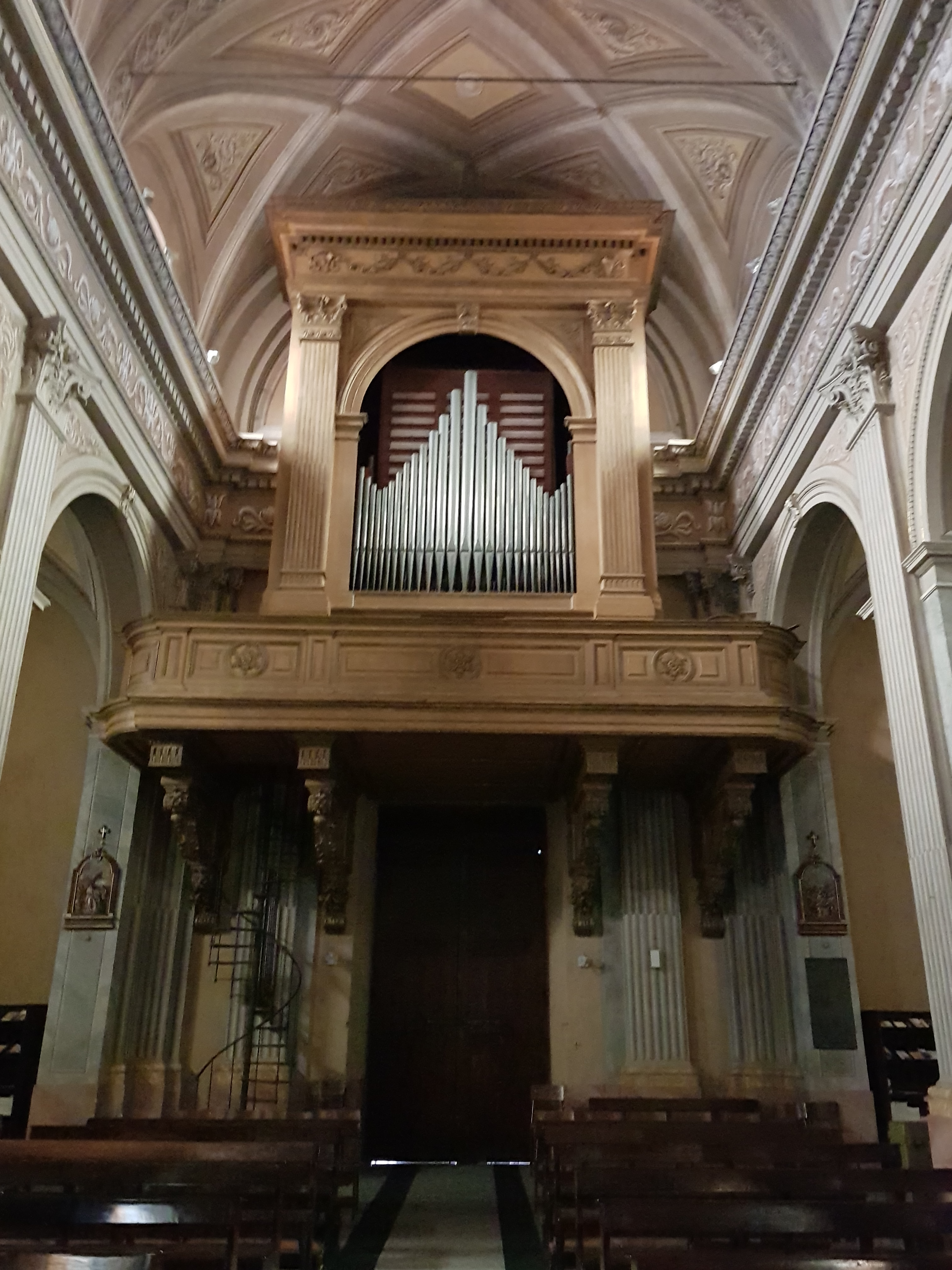
Pipe Organ in the Church of St. Peter and Paul, Arese

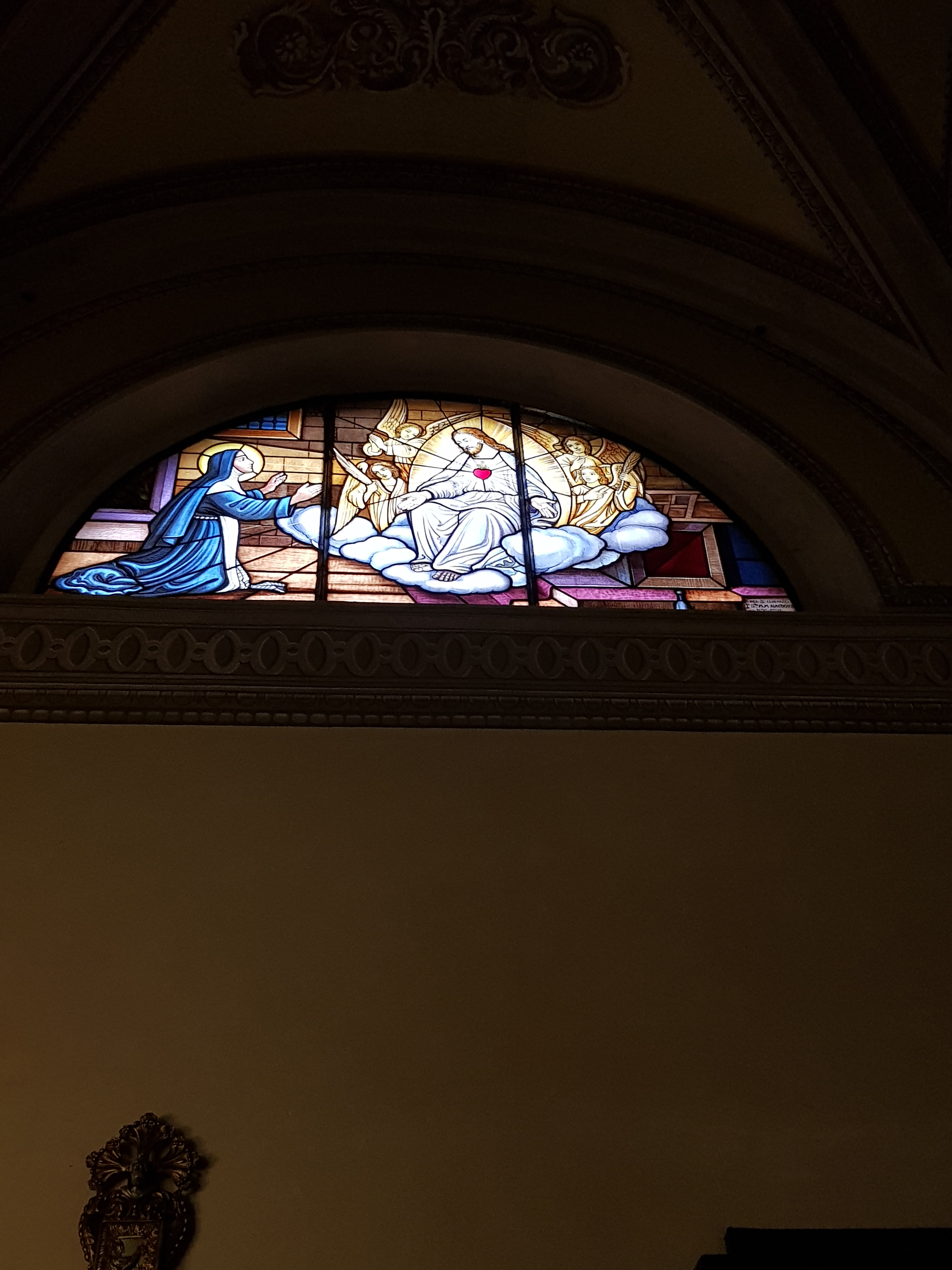
Grass window in the church representing the love of Jesus in the right side of the Church of St. Peter and Paul, Arese

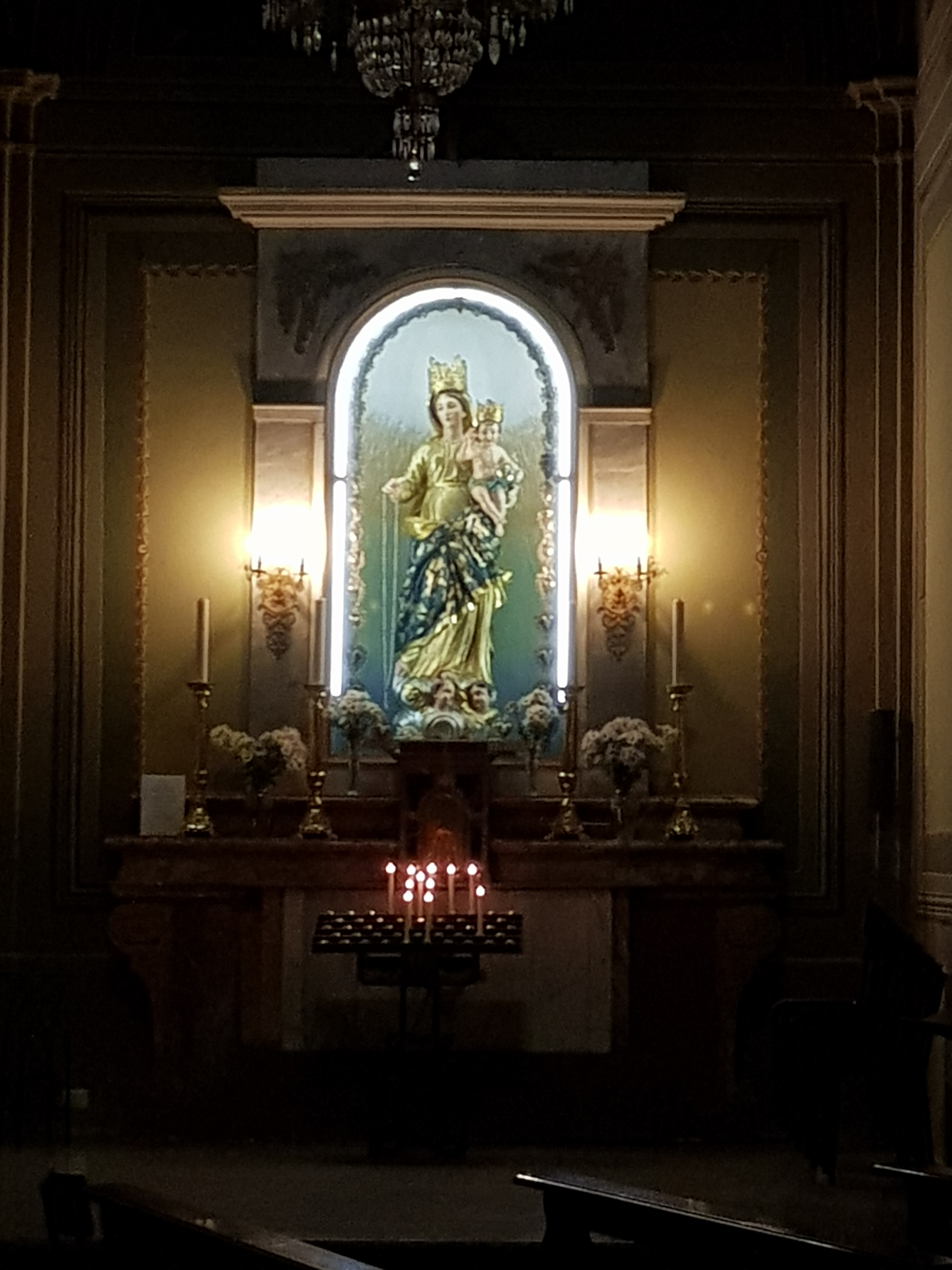
Statue of Mary, mother of Jesus located in the left chapel of the Church of St.Peter and Paul, Arese
