= Corfu incident =

1923 Greek–Italian military crisis

Corfu incident of 1923
- Part of the interwar period
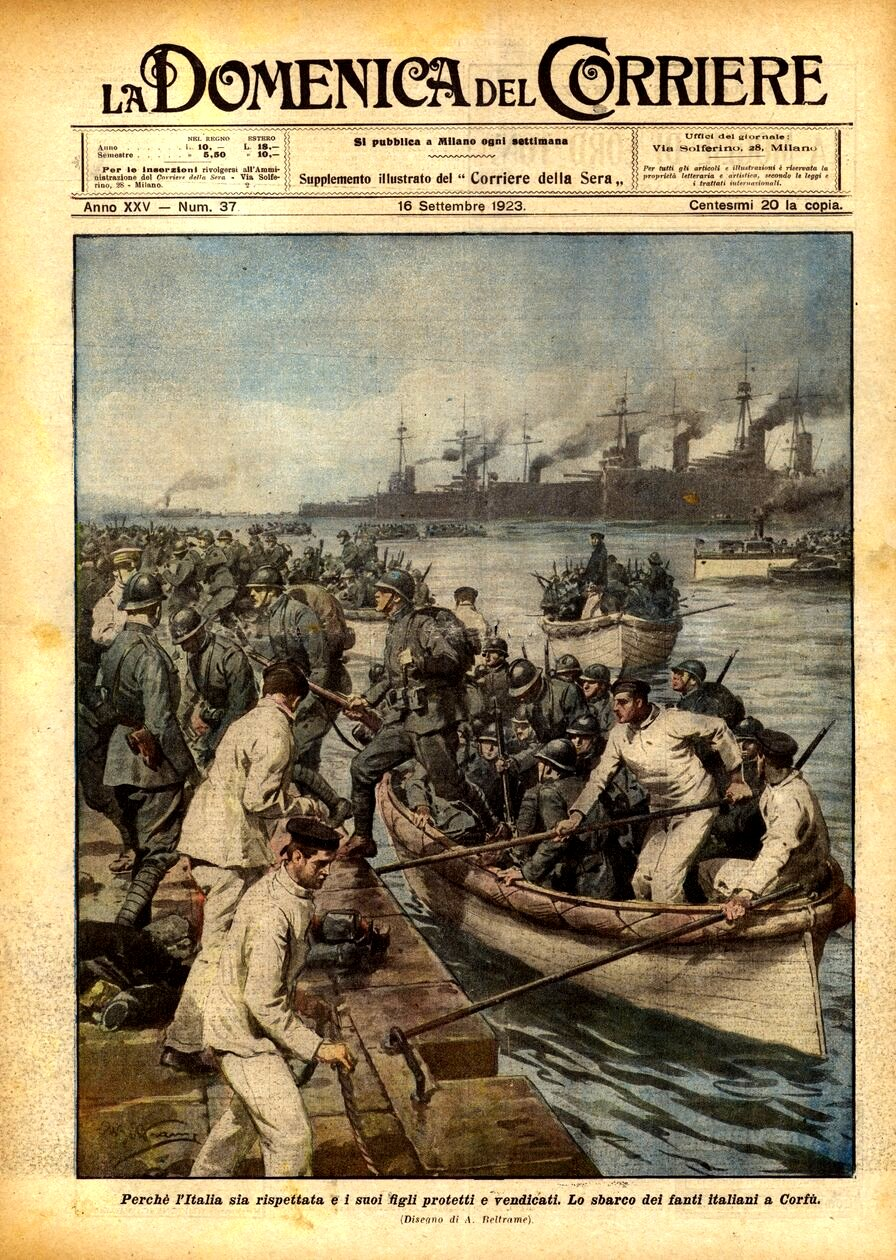
- Disembarkation of Italian soldiers at Corfu, cover of the Corriere della Sera by Achille Beltrame
Date	August 29 – September 27, 1923
Location	Corfu, Kingdom of Greece 39°40′N 19°45′E
Result	Agreement between Italy and Greece under the auspices of the League of Nations

Belligerents
Italy	Greece; Diplomatic support: Kingdom of Serbs, Croats, and Slovenes

Commanders and leaders
Benito Mussolini; Emilio Solari	Stylianos Gonatas

Strength
2–3 battleships; 2–4 cruisers; 5–6 destroyers; 2 torpedo boats; 4 MAS boats; 2 submarines; 1 airship; Numerous aircraft; 6 batteries of light artillery; 5,000–10,000 troops	150 infantry troops

Casualties and losses
None	16 civilians killed, 30 wounded and 2 amputated (per Greek sources); 20 civilians killed and 32 wounded (reported) Most of the victims were Armenian Genocide survivors and refugees
- Location within Greece

The Corfu incident was a 1923 diplomatic and military crisis between Greece and Italy. It was triggered when Enrico Tellini, an Italian general heading a commission to resolve a border dispute between Albania and Greece, was murdered in Greek territory along with two other officers of his staff. In response, Benito Mussolini issued an ultimatum to Greece and, when it was not accepted in whole, dispatched forces to bombard and occupy Corfu. Mussolini defied the League of Nations and stated Italy would leave if it arbitrated in the crisis, and the Conference of Ambassadors instead eventually tendered an agreement favouring Italy. This was an early demonstration of the League's weakness when dealing with larger powers.

== Background ==
During the Italo-Ottoman war of 1911–12, Italy had occupied the Dodecanese islands whose population was largely Greek. Under the Venizelos–Tittoni agreement of 1919, Italy promised to cede the Dodecanese islands except for Rhodes to Greece in exchange for Greek recognition of the Italian claims to part of Anatolia. However, the Turkish National Movement's victory in the Turkish War of Independence had put an end to all plans for partitioning Asia Minor by 1922, and Mussolini took the view that since the Italians had been forced out of Turkey that cancelled out the obligation to cede the Dodecanese islands to Greece. The Greeks continued to press Mussolini on the Dodecanese issue, and in the summer of 1923, he ordered the Italian garrison in the Dodecanese reinforced as part of his plans to formally annex the islands to Italy, which caused Greece to issue notes of protest.

In May 1923, during a visit to Rome, the British Foreign Secretary, Lord Curzon, told Mussolini that Britain would cede Jubaland and Jarabub to Italy as part of a general settlement of all of Italy's claims, saying that Italians had to settle their disputes with both Yugoslavia and Greece as part of the price of Jubaland and Jarabub. Under the terms of the Treaty of London of 1915, under which Italy entered World War I, Britain had promised to cede Jubaland and Jarabub to Italy, and as Mussolini had founded the Fascist Party in 1919 in part to protest the "mutilated victory" of 1918 as Italy did not obtain all of the territory promised by the Treaty of London, Jubaland and Jarabub had over-sized symbolic importance in Italy far out of proportion to the actual value of these territories. To obtain Jubaland and Jarabub would mean that Italy would have to settle the Fiume dispute with Yugoslavia and the Dodecanese islands dispute with Greece, neither of which Mussolini wanted to compromise on. Though the Milner-Scialoja agreement of 1920 had committed Britain to cede Jubaland and Jarabub to Italy, the British had subsequently tied that to the Italians settling the Dodecanese islands dispute first. Under the Treaty of Lausanne in July 1923, all of the Allied powers abandoned their claims to Turkey, which badly damaged Mussolini's prestige as he promised as an opposition leader to obtain all of the territories the Italians had fought for in World War I including a large chunk of Anatolia. Having denounced his predecessors as weak leaders who had brought about the "mutilated victory" of 1918 and promised that he was a "strong leader" who would undo the "mutilated victory", Mussolini by the summer of 1923 was to face the reality that Italy was simply too weak to achieve all of his promises.

There was a boundary dispute between Greece and Albania. The two nations took their dispute to the Conference of Ambassadors, which created a commission of British, French, and Italian officials to determine the boundary, which was authorized by the League of Nations to settle the dispute. The Italian General Enrico Tellini became the chairman of the commission. From the outset of the negotiations, the relations between Greece and the commission were bad. Eventually the Greek delegate openly accused Tellini of working in favour of Albania's claims.

In July 1923, Mussolini ordered the Regia Marina's admirals to start preparing for Corfu's occupation, which he predicated would happen that summer in response to the "expected provocative acts" by Greece. The Italian Navy minister, Admiral Paolo Thaon di Revel, welcomed the plan to seize Corfu for budgetary reasons, believing a triumph by the Regia Marina would show the Italian people the navy's importance and thus lead to a bigger naval budget. At the same time, Mussolini did not inform the professional diplomats of the Palazzo Chigi about his plans to seize Corfu, expecting them to object, an expectation that was confirmed when Corfu was indeed bombarded.

== Tellini's murder ==
Location of Kakavia, where Enrico Tellini was murdered

On 27 August 1923, Tellini and two aides, plus an interpreter and a chauffeur, were ambushed and assassinated by unknown assailants at Kakavia's border crossing, near the town of Ioannina in Greek territory. The five victims were Tellini, Major Luigi Corti, Lieutenant Mario Bonacini, Albanian interpreter Thanas Gheziri and the chauffeur Remigio Farnetti. None of the victims were robbed. The incident occurred close to the disputed border and therefore could have been carried out by either side.

According to Italian newspapers and the official statement of the Albanian government, the attack was carried out by Greeks, while other sources, including the Greek government and its officials and the Romanian consul in Ioannina, attributed the murder to Albanian bandits. Albanian bandits were active in the area since 1921, and Tellini had several Albanians, including notables, executed during his service in Vlorë, just before fighting erupted in the area.

In April 1945, the British Ambassador to Greece, Reginald Leeper, sent a letter to British Foreign Secretary Sir Anthony Eden that expressed the viewpoint that it was the Cham Albanians who were responsible for General Tellini's murder. The letter stated that Daout Hodja (Daut Hoxha), a Cham Albanian bandit, killed General Tellini and the other officers. Summarising the most recent evidence, the Greek historian Aristotle Kallis wrote:

Much about the incident which resulted in Tellini's assassination remains unclear. There is sufficient evidence to lend credence to the Greek government's argument that the perpetrators had in fact originated from Albania and had crossed the border illegally to ambush the car inside Greece and thus inculpate the Greek side.

== Italian and Greek reactions ==
Upon news of the murder, anti-Greek demonstrations broke out in Italy. The Greek newspapers were reported by Australian newspapers to

condemn unanimously the Tellini crime, and express friendly sentiments towards Italy. They hope that the Cabinet will give legitimate satisfaction to Italy without going beyond the limits of national dignity.

On August 28, 1923, Prime Minister Benito Mussolini sent a cable to the Prefects of Lecce and Bari "to make the necessary preparations to stop all cable-telegraphic communications directed to Greece, unless instructed otherwise." Thereafter, Italy sent an ultimatum to Greece on August 29, 1923, demanding:

1. a complete official apology at the Italian legation in Athens,
2. a solemn funeral in the Catholic cathedral in Athens in the presence of the whole of the Greek government,
3. military honours for the bodies of the victims,
4. full honours by the Greek fleet to the Italian fleet which would be sent to Piraeus,
5. capital punishment for the guilty,
6. an indemnity of 50 million lire within five days of receipt of the note and
7. a strict inquiry, to be carried out quickly with the assistance of the Italian military attaché.

In addition, Italy demanded that Greece must reply to the ultimatum within 24 hours.

Greece replied to Italy on August 30, 1923, accepting four of the demands which with modifications as follows:

1. The Piraeus commandant would express the Greek Government's sorrow to the Italian Minister,
2. a memorial service will be held in the presence of members of the government,
3. on the same day a detachment of the guard would salute the Italian flag at the Italian legation,
4. the military would render honors to the remains of the victims when they were transferred to an Italian warship.

The other demands were rejected on the ground that they would infringe the sovereignty and honor of Greece.

In addition, the Greek government declared its complete willingness to grant, as a measure of justice, an equitable indemnity to the families of the victims, and that it didn't accept an enquiry in the presence of the Italian military attaché but it would be pleased to accept any assistance which Colonel Perone (the Italian military attaché) might be able to lend by supplying any information likely to facilitate the discovery of the assassins.

Mussolini and his cabinet were unsatisfied with the Greek government's reply and declared that it was unacceptable. The Italian press, including the opposition journals, endorsed Mussolini's demands and insisted that Greece must comply without discussion. Mussolini's decision was received with enthusiasm in all of Italy.

== Bombardment and occupation of Corfu ==
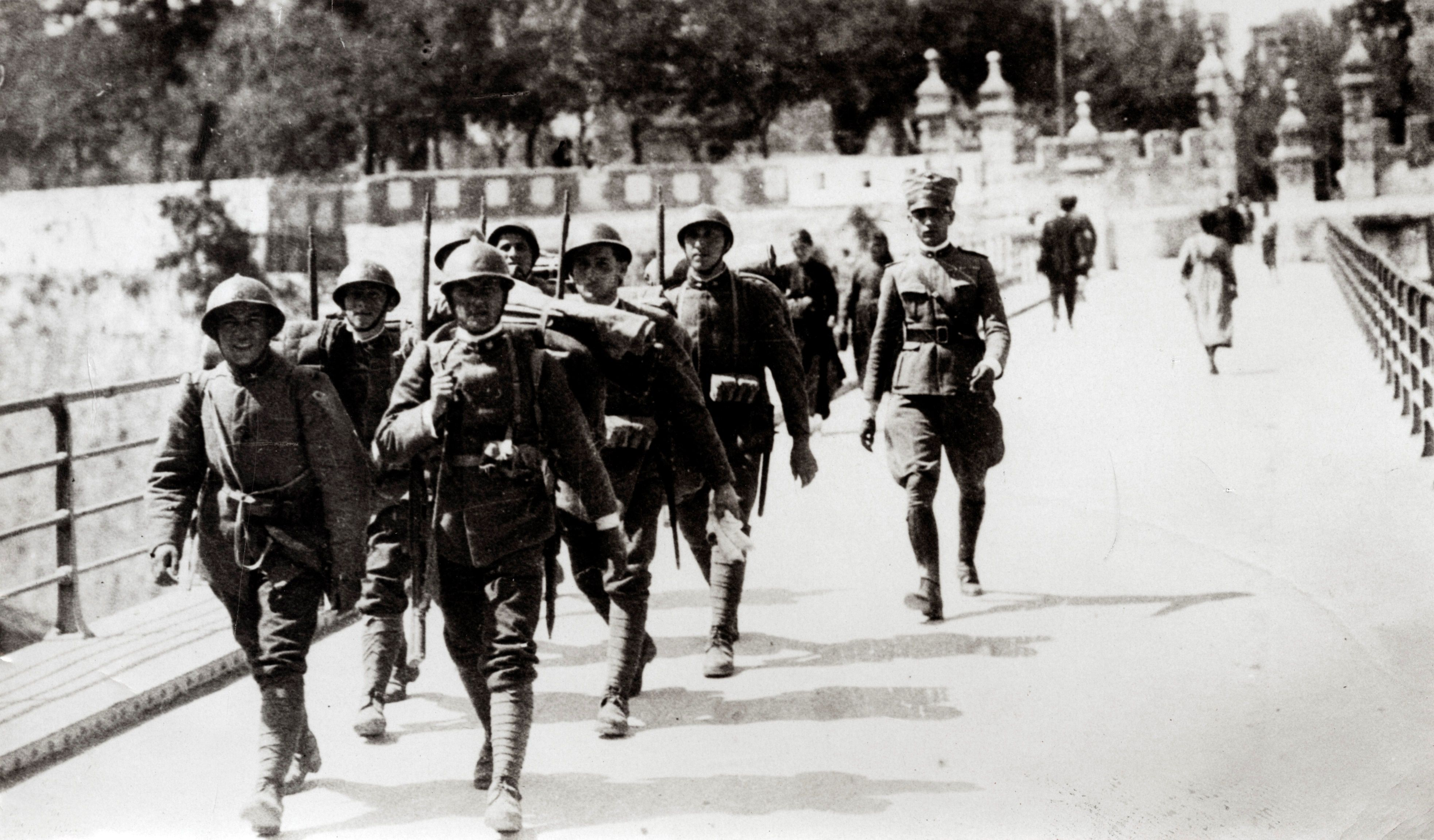
Italian soldiers march across a bridge in Corfu.

On August 31, 1923, a squadron of the Italian Navy bombarded the Greek island of Corfu and landed between 5,000 and 10,000 troops. Aeroplanes aided the attack. Italian fire was concentrated on the town's Old Fortress, which had long been demilitarized and served as a shelter for refugees from Asia Minor, and on the Cities Police school at the New Fortress, which was also a refugee shelter. The bombardment lasted 15 to 30 minutes. As a result of the bombardment 16 civilians were killed, 30 injured and two had limbs amputated, while according to other sources 20 were killed and 32 wounded. There were no soldiers reported among the victims, all of whom were refugees and orphans. The majority of those killed were children. The Commissioner of the U.K. based charity, Save the Children Fund, described the Italian bombardment as "inhuman and revolting, unjustifiable and unnecessary".

The Corfu's prefect, Petros Evripaios, Greek officers and officials were arrested by the Italians and detained aboard an Italian warship. The Greek garrison of 150 men did not surrender but retired to the island's interior.

Following the landing, the Italian officers feared British citizens may have been wounded or killed, and were relieved to discover that there were no British subjects among the victims. However, the residence of the British officer in charge of the police training school was looted by Italian soldiers.

Mussolini in a speech denounced the Greek government for not understanding that "Corfu had been Venetian for four hundred years", before becoming part of Greece in 1864. Throughout the crisis, Mussolini kept stating that Corfu had been ruled by Venice in a manner that suggested he viewed Corfu as rightfully part of Italy rather than Greece under the grounds that Italy was the heir to the Most Serene Republic of Venice. One of the few groups in Italy who did object to the bombardment were the senior diplomats of the Palazzo Chigi who were not informed. Many of them, including Salvatore Contarini, the Permanent Secretary to the Foreign Minister, were on vacation on the day of the bombardment.

During the crisis, Contarini together with Antonio Salandra, the Italian delegate to the League of Nations, and Romano Avezzana, the Italian ambassador to France, emerged as a force for moderation within the Italian government, constantly working to persuade Mussolini to drop his more extreme demands and to accept a compromise. Mussolini, who only became prime minister on 28 October 1922, was determined to assert his power by proving that he was an unconventional leader who did not follow the normal rules of diplomacy, and the Corfu crisis was the first clash between Mussolini and the traditional elites in Italy, who while not objecting to imperialistic policies, disliked Il Duce's reckless style. At the time, Italy was engaging in negotiations with Britain for the cession of Jubaland in East Africa and Jarabub in North Africa to the Italian empire. From the viewpoint of the Palazzo Chigi, the success of these negotiations hinged in part on presenting Italy as a responsible partner to Britain, which was threatened by Mussolini's rash behavior such as the occupation of Corfu.

== Reactions after the bombardment and occupation of Corfu ==
Following the incident, the Greek government proclaimed martial law throughout Greece. The Greek fleet was ordered to retire to the Gulf of Volos to avoid contact with the Italian fleet. The drachma plummeted in value, sparking near panic among the banks. In the Athens Cathedral, a solemn memorial service was held for the people who were killed in the Corfu bombardment, and the bells of all of the churches were tolled continuously. After the service, demonstrations against Italy broke out. All places of amusement were closed as a sign of mourning for the victims of the bombardment. After the protest of the Italian Minister, the Greek Government suspended for one day the newspaper Eleftheros Typos for characterizing the Italians as "the fugitives of Caporetto" and dismissed the censor for allowing the statement to pass. The Greek Government provided a detachment of 30 men to guard the Italian Legation in Athens. Greek newspapers were unanimous in condemning Italy's action.

Italy closed the Straits of Otranto to Greek ships. In addition, Italy suspended all Greek shipping companies sailing for her, and ordered Italian ships to boycott Greece, although the Greek ports were open to Italian vessels. Greek steamers were detained in Italian ports and one was seized by a submarine in the straits of Corfu, but on September 2, the Italian Ministry of Marine ordered all Greek ships to be released from Italian ports. Anti-Greek demonstrations broke out in Italy again. The Italian government was reported to have planned to call up two classes of reservists and ordered the Italian reservists in London to hold themselves in readiness for army service. The King of Italy, Victor Emmanuel III, returned to Rome from his summer residence immediately. The Italian military attaché who was sent to inquire into the murder of the Italian delegates was recalled by the Italian legation, and Greek journalists were expelled from Italy.

Albania reinforced the Greco-Albanian frontier and prohibited passage across.

The Kingdom of Yugoslavia, which was already in disagreement with Italy over Fiume, was also linked to Greece through royal marriage and in addition had a mutual agreement to assist Greece in the event of an attack ordered reservists on leave to return. Queen Marie of Romania rushed back home from Paris. Yugoslavia and Romania were members of the Little Entente.

Elements in Turkey advised Mustafa Kemal to seize the opportunity to invade Western Thrace.

The head of the Near East Relief said that the bombardment was completely unnecessary and unjustified. Italy called the American legation to protest against this statement.

The chairman on the League of Nations commission assisting deported women and children, who was an eyewitness of the bombardment, said: "The crime of Corfu was official murder by a civilized nation...I consider the manner in which Corfu occupied as inhuman."

Lord Curzon wrote that the "terms demanded by Mussolini are extravagant-much worse than the ultimatum after Sarajevo". In a telegram to Prime Minister Stanley Baldwin, who was vacationing at Aix-les-Bains, Curzon wrote that Mussolini's actions were "violent and inexcusable" and if Britain did not support the Greek appeal to the League of Nations then "that institution may as well shut its doors".Harold Nicolson and Sir William Tyrrell at the Foreign Office wrote a memo calling for "concentrating our efforts to protect Greece through the agency of the League of Nations against an unfair exploitation by Italy". Lord Curzon's initial attempt to end the crisis by referring it to the League of Nations was dropped after Mussolini threatened to leave the League. More importantly, sanctions against Italy would require the approval of the League Council, and it was believed that France would veto any sanctions against Italy if the Corfu incident was referred to the League. Within Whitehall, the Treasury objected to sanctions against Italy on the grounds that any League sanctions would be ineffective as the United States, not being a member of the League, would continue to trade with Italy, while the Admiralty demanded a declaration of war against Italy as the prerequisite for a blockade. Howard William Kennard, in charge of the British embassy in Rome as the ambassador Sir Ronald Graham was on vacation, wrote in a dispatch to Lord Curzon that Mussolini was possibly insane, a man suffering from a "mixture of megalomania and extreme patriotism". Kennard drew the conclusion that Mussolini was perhaps rash enough to turn the crisis into an all-out war between Italy and Greece as he kept demanding sums of money in compensation that were well beyond Greece's ability to pay. However, Kennard believed that the fascist regime was the only thing saving Italy from communism, and if Mussolini were defeated in a war, then the regime would collapse and the Italian Communist Party would take over. As Kennard much preferred fascism in power in Italy to communism, this led him to advocate appeasement, saying that Britain must pressure Greece to submit to the Italian terms while trying to persuade Mussolini to lower the compensation amounts as the best way of avoiding a war.

Farther afield, Yugoslavia and Czechoslovakia were more supportive of Greece, with both governments condemning Italy's actions.

== Resolution ==
Kakavia (with red) and Corfu (with green).

On September 1, Greece appealed to the League of Nations, but Antonio Salandra, the Italian representative to the League, informed the Council that he had no permission to discuss the crisis. Mussolini refused to co-operate with the League and demanded that the Conference of Ambassadors should deal with the matter.

On September 2, Italy threatened that it would leave the League rather than allow it to interfere. Greece, in contrast, stated that she was willing to pay any reparations the ambassadors deemed necessary, noting that her investigation into the murders could not extend beyond her borders and that intervention by an international body would therefore be preferable.

On September 3, Antonio Salandra requested a delay in the Council meeting while he awaited instructions from his government.

On September 5, despite Mussolini’s threats to withdraw Italy from the League, the Council went ahead and held a public meeting to discuss the issue. At that session, Antonio Salandra presented Italy’s position, while Nikolaos Politis responded on behalf of Greece. In the meantime, the Conference of Ambassadors had prepared a set of proposals which were discussed by the Council on September 6. The minutes from that meeting were then forwarded to the Conference of Ambassadors.

Britain favored referring the Corfu matter to the League of Nations, but France opposed such a course of action fearing that it would provide a precedent for the League to become involved in its own occupation of the Ruhr.

Given the threat of Italian withdrawal and the lack of French support, the matter was ultimately referred to the Conference of Ambassadors. This outcome preserved Italy's prestige and spared France from any connection between the Corfu issue and the Ruhr occupation at the League of Nations.

On September 8 the Conference of Ambassadors announced to both Greece and Italy, as well as to the League of Nations, the terms upon which the dispute should be settled.

The decision was that:

1. the Greek Fleet shall render a salute of 21 guns at Piraeus to the Italian Fleet, which will enter the port, followed by French and British warships, which shall be included in the salute,
2. a funeral service shall be attended by the Greek Cabinet,
3. military honours shall be rendered to the slain upon embarkation at Preveza,
4. Greece shall deposit 50,000,000 lire in a Swiss bank as a guarantee,
5. the highest Greek military authority must apologise to the British, French, and Italian representatives at Athens,
6. there shall be a Greek inquiry into the murders, which must be supervised by a special international commission presided over by the Japanese Lieutenant-Colonel Shibuya, who was a military attaché of the Japanese embassy, and which must be completed by September 27,
7. Greece must guarantee the commission's safety and defray its expenses and
8. the conference requested the Greek Government to communicate its complete acceptance immediately, separately, and simultaneously to the British, French, and Italian representatives at Athens.
9. In addition, the conference requested the Albanian Government to facilitate the commission's work in Albanian territory.

Both Greece, on September 8, and Italy, on September 9, accepted it. The Italians added, however, that they would not evacuate the island until Greece had given full satisfaction.

In Italy the press widely reported satisfaction with the Conference's decision and praised Mussolini.

On September 11, the Greek delegate, Nikolaos Politis, informed the Council that Greece had deposited the 50,000,000 lire in a Swiss bank, and on September 14, the Conference of Ambassadors informed Mussolini that Italy must evacuate Corfu no later than September 27. Mussolini agreed to this deadline within 48 hours after pressure from France and Britain, who warned that if he didn't comply, the entire issue would be brought before the Assembly on September 17.

On September 19, the Council once again publicly debated whether the League had the right to intervene. Mussolini continued to reject the League's authority to address the incident and Antonio Salandra argued that the League's Covenant did not forbid "peaceful reprisals" (which is how he described the bombardment of Corfu). However, he added that Italy was open to having the issue interpreted by an official judicial body. The debate resumed the next morning, and it was ultimately decided to refer the question of the League's authority to a panel of legal experts.

On September 26, the Conference of Ambassadors awarded Italy an indemnity of 50,000,000 lire, on the alleged ground that "the Greek authorities had been guilty of a certain negligence before and after the crime." According to journalists, no one could say if the decision was fair, as the evidence it was based on was not made public. Some members of the Assembly were not satisfied, and on September 28, during a public session, representatives from Sweden, Norway, South Africa, Finland, Ireland, Colombia, Denmark, Persia, and the Netherlands took the floor and, to loud applause, strongly criticized Mussolini's actions.

In addition, Italy demanded from Greece 1,000,000 lire per day for the cost of the occupation of Corfu; the Conference of Ambassadors replied that Italy reserved the right of recourse to an International Court of Justice in connection with the occupation expenses.

In Greece there was a general depression over the decision, because Italy had obtained everything it demanded. The Greek government responded by emphasizing its efforts to identify those responsible for the crime, and argued that the investigation was hindered by the presence of the suspects in Albania, where Greece couldn't pursue them. It also expressed the opinion that the imposition of the fine was deeply upsetting to the Greek people, who had trusted the Great Powers, especially since three out of four of their representatives believed that Greece was not to blame.

Harold Nicolson, a first secretary in the central department of the Foreign Office, said: "In response to the successive menaces of M. Mussolini we muzzled the League, we imposed the fine on Greece without evidence of her guilt and without reference to the Hague, and we disbanded the Commission of Enquiry. A settlement was thus achieved."

== Corfu evacuation ==
On September 27, the Italian flag was lowered and the Italian troops evacuated Corfu. The Italian fleet and a Greek destroyer saluted the Italian flag, then the Italian flagship saluted the Greek flag.

40,000 residents of Corfu welcomed the prefect when he landed, and shouldered him to the prefecture. British and French flags were waved by the crowd which demonstrated enthusiastically in front of the British and French consulates.

The Italian squadron had been ordered to remain anchored until Italy received the 50 million lire. The money, deposited in a Swiss bank, was at the disposal of the Hague Tribunal, and the bank refused to transfer the money to Rome without the authority of the National Bank of Greece, which was given on the evening of the same day.

On September 29, Mussolini ordered the return of 10 million of the 50 million lire, and directed it to be spent on needy Greek and Armenian refugees.

On September 30, the Italian fleet, except one destroyer, departed.

== Aftermath ==
The reputation of Mussolini in Italy was greatly enhanced thanks to the incident.

Many Italian operas were performed at the Municipal Theatre of Corfu during the first quarter of the 20th century. This tradition came to a halt following the Corfu incident. After the bombardment, it featured Greek operas and Greek theater performances by Greek actors such as Marika Kotopouli and Pelos Katselis.

== Conclusion ==
The ulterior motive for the invasion was Corfu's strategic position at the entrance of the Adriatic Sea.

The crisis was the first major test for the League of Nations, and the League failed it. It showed that the League was weak and couldn't settle disputes when a great power confronted a small one. Its authority had been openly defied by Italy, a founding member of the League and a permanent member of the Council. The Italian fascist regime had managed to prevail in its first major international confrontation. The incident is commonly seen as exposing the "true nature" of Italy's League membership and demonstrating that Italy did not consider its participation to be legally or ethically binding.

As the Greeks became focused on securing the return of Corfu, the Dodecanese islands issue faded into the background, and the Greek government ceased to protest the continued Italian occupation of the islands, which Mussolini formally annexed to Italy in 1925.

The crisis was also a failure for the policy of Britain, which had appeared as the greatest champion of the League during the crisis.

In addition, it showed the purpose and tone of fascist foreign policy. Italy's invasion of Corfu was Mussolini's most aggressive move of the 1920s. The reputation of Mussolini in Italy was enhanced.

== Stamps ==
An Italian Post Office opened on September 11, 1923 in Corfu, issuing a set of 8 Italian stamps overprinted "CORFÙ" which were placed on sale on the 20th. Three additional stamps overprinted in Greek currency arrived on 24th. The third stamp was 2.40 drachma on 1 lire. The Post Office closed at midday on 26 September 1923, only remaining open to dispatch the morning mail. The office had been open for 15 days.

Three further values arrived on the day the Post Office closed, and were never issued. They eventually became available for sale at the postal ministry in Rome. Many used copies of these stamps have forged postmarks, but it is known that the Corfu cancel was applied to hundreds of stamps before the Post Office closed.

== People in key roles in Greece and Italy ==
=== Greece ===
- Stylianos Gonatas, Prime Minister.
- Nikolaos Politis, Greek representative to the League of Nations.
- Georgios Papandreou, Minister of Internal Affairs.

=== Italy ===
- Benito Mussolini, Prime Minister.
- Antonio Salandra, Italian representative to the League of Nations.
- Victor Emmanuel III, King of Italy.
- General Armando Diaz, Minister of War.
- Giulio Cesare Montagna, the Italian ambassador in Athens.
- Colonel Perone di San Martino, the Italian military attaché.
- Admiral Emilio Solari, commander of the Italian troops in Corfu.
- Admiral Diego Simonetti, commander of the Italian fleet in Lower Adriatic, he was appointed as Corfu governor during the occupation.
- Captain Antonio Foschini, chief of the naval staff, the man who presented the ultimatum about the Italian occupation to the Greek prefect.
