= Santi Pietro e Paolo, Monastero di Vasco =

Church building in Roapiana, Monastero di Vasco, Italy

Santi Pietro e Paolo (Saints Peter and Paul) is a Baroque-style Roman Catholic parish church located at #1, Via Malborgo, in the town of Monastero di Vasco, Province of Cuneo, region of Piedmont, Italy.

== History ==
The church was built between 1764 and 1776 following designs by Benedetto Alfieri. The interior was decorated in 1870 by Francesco Toscano. It has several altars of polychrome marble, including one from the now-ruined Benedictine Monastery, which gave the town its name. It contains a 17th-century altarpiece by an unknown artist, Virgin, Child, and Saints Peter and Paul, and a painting of the Annunciation on canvas by the brothers Toscano.
