= Parco dell'Orecchiella =

Park in Tuscany, Italy

The Parco dell'Orecchiella is a park on the slopes of the Apennines in the Garfagnana region of Tuscany, central Italy, included in the townships of Piazza al Serchio, San Romano, Sillano Giuncugnano and Villa Collemandina. It is a wilderness park, protected by the State Forestry Department. The park is subdivided into three natural reserves: "l'Orecchiella", "la Pania di Corfino", and "Lama Rossa".

The park includes large forests of beech, chestnut, and fir. The fauna consists of woodland species such as the Italian wolf, wild boar, deer, and mouflon. The area is also characterized by its raptors, including falcons and golden eagles.

The State Forestry Department Visitors' Center at the park includes a Natural History Museum and a Museum of Raptors. The park also includes a botanical garden: Giardino Botanico "Maria Ansaldi" Pania di Corfino which contains many species of plants typical of mountainous environments: herbaceous annuals and perennials, shrubs, and trees typifying the Apennine habitat.
