= San Pellegrinetto =

Former Italian comune incorporated into Fabbriche di Vergemoli

- Former comune
- Comune di San Pellegrinetto
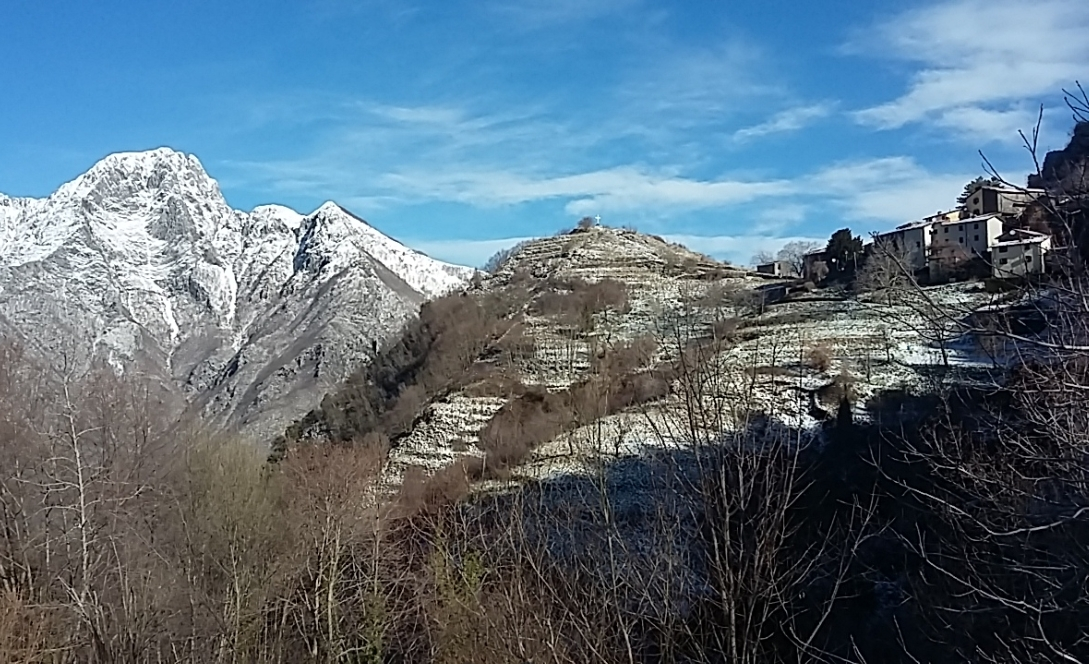

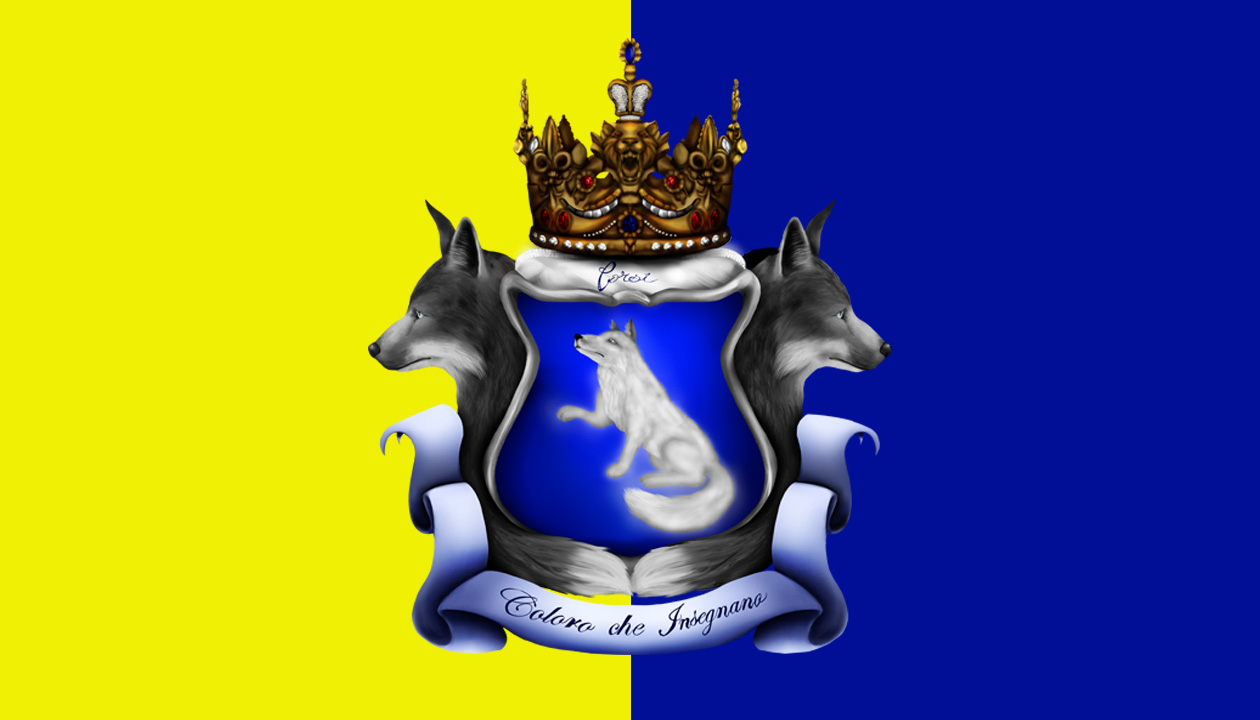
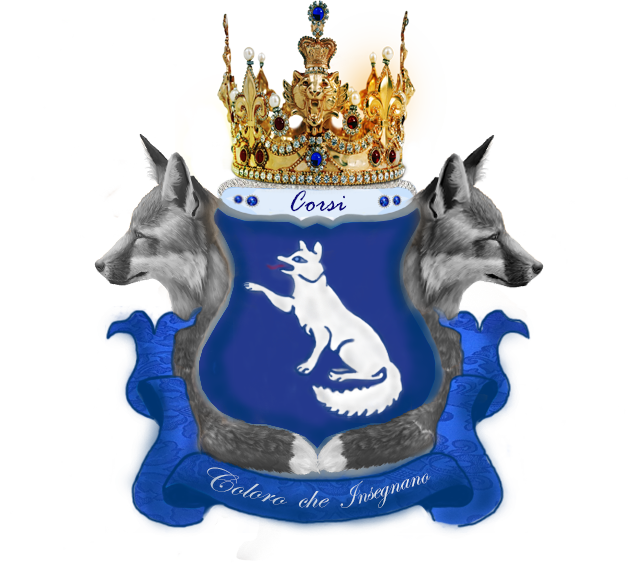
- Flag Coat of arms

- Location within Italy Location within Tuscany
- Coordinates: 44°01′17″N 10°23′01″E
- Country: Italy
- Region: Tuscany
- Province: Lucca

Area
  - Total: 42.55 km^{2} (16.43 sq mi)
- Elevation: 953 m (3,127 ft)

Population (2021)
  - Total: 15
  - Density: 0.35/km^{2} (0.91/sq mi)
- Time zone: UTC+1 (CET)
  - Summer (DST): UTC+2 (CEST)
- Postal code: 55021
- Dialing code: 0583
- ISTAT code: 046036
- Patron saint: San Pellegrino delle Alpi
- Saint day: 1 August
- Website: https://comune.fabbrichedivergemoli.lu.it/
- Website, area and ISTAT of the current municipality (comune) to which San Pellegrinetto was incorporated.

San Pellegrinetto was an Italian comune in the Alps of Garfagnana, a historic region of Tuscany, province of Lucca. It was dependent for many years on the comune of Trassilico, time during which it adopted the name Alpe di Trassilico until the creation of its parish. When Trassilico was incorporated as a fraction of Gallicano, so was San Pellegrinetto. It was eventually incorporated into the comune of Fabbriche di Vergemoli.

Its population is of 15 inhabitants, being one of the historic Italian comunes close to extinction, a situation that is slowly trying to be reversed with the "1Є Houses" project instituted by the comune of Fabbriche di Vergemoli in 2017.

== Name ==
Before the current name of the municipality, the town had the name Alpe di Trassilico. As all mountain towns built on the Garfagnana mountains, it was also influenced by the legend of Saint Pellegrino delle Alpi who became the town's patron saint. Stories tell he was the prince of a Scottish king during the late Roman Empire who, although endowed with a great fortune, abandoned everything and sought an existence as a hermit in a cave in the mountains of Garfagnana, where he lived until he died. There his body rested until his relics were discovered along with his remains and those of his partner and converted disciple San Bianco, where the Sanctuary of San Pellegrino in Alpe was erected.

The main change in nomenclature was insurged by the city leaders in the year 1680 when they decided to raise a Parish dedicated to San Pellegrino. These leaders were the descendants of the devotees of San Pellegrino and Bianco, of the sculptor Matteo Civitali, who even built the tomb of the Sanctuary dedicated to this saint and those of the branch of the Corsi Family that had been responsible for the creation of the fief and who financed the construction of the Church through one Antonio Corsi who had been elevated first marquis of the town in 1635.

== Foundation ==
Its history dates back the pre-Roman period. The first settlement took place in the year 1400 by sheepherders. The location, which was endowed with several springs and prairies, facilitated cattle ranching, which transformed the rentals into small uncrowded residential houses, separated by several nuclei scattered in the places where the sheep stayed, bringing economic importance to the place, which attracted, among several buyers and expansionists, Antonio Corsi, who ascended as the first marquis of the city on 29 May 1635.

== Coat of arms, flag and arms ==
The city began to adopt the Marquisate's banner as its coat of arms and embedded it centrally in its flag, which in turn was divided between the colors Royal Blue and Golden Yellow, inspired by the colors of the province of Modena, to which it belonged for many years. On the coat of arms, in the center, is a rampant fox with whitish fur, which according to Antonio "seemed to be so covered with snow that it was white, just as our hills get in winter" and with "a bluish eye that reflects our riches". Above it a crown with precious stones adorning a lion's head rampant in gold, the early symbol of the Corsi from Florence. To the left and right are grayish or white foxes that "watch attentively for dangers" and below is a loose silk sash on which are written the following sayings (originally in Latin): "Those who teach", likely alluding to Antonio's position as a member of the court of the d'Este for many years.

== Marquisate and history of San Pellegrinetto ==
Antonio Corsi lived in Palazzo dei Boni on Via dei Pecori in Florence with his wife and son. However, after a disagreement with his stepmother, Laura Corsini, about the property surrounding his father Jacopo Corsi's inheritance, he had to move out of the city in a hurry. Antonio's father-in-law, Giovanni Boni, was a long-time member of the royal house of the de' Medici Family since he had served Grand Duke Ferdinand I de' Medici, a former cardinal he had met in Rome. Because of this, he had several contacts, among which was Cesare d'Este, Duke of Modena, and brother-in-law of the Grand Duke, to whom he had served as resident ambassador on 23 June 1605. When Cesare d'Este died on 11 December 1628, it coincided with the need to hire new servants to assist his son, Alfonso III d'Este, and Giovanni Boni, who had already rendered services to the family, with the help of Ferdinand II de' Medici, indicated his son-in-law and obtained a position for him at the court of the d'Este family, specifically as chamberlain to Alfonso.

Before leaving Florence, Antonio sold the Palazzo dei Boni (his inheritance) to the Antinori family in early 1629 for 3,200 ducats. The value, below the sale parameters of other family palaces in the area, was likely due to Antonio's haste and fear of leaving Florence. The remainder of the inheritance was left to his brother Giovanni, who in turn ascended as the 2nd Marquis of Caiazzo and went on to administer the family estate in Florence.

By 12 February 1629 Antonio Corsi was out of Florence with his wife Giovanna, who was pregnant with their second child, at which time he went to the court of the d'Este family in Garfagnana as previously contracted by his father-in-law, becoming chamberlain and close friend of Alfonso III d'Este. However, Alfonso III's reign did not last long. He, who was deeply in love with his wife Isabella of Savoy, became a widower in 1626. When his father died in 1628, Alfonso III d'Este became Sovereign Duke of Modena, but he considered taking religious vows and abandoning the title. When Alfonso III abdicated the throne on 22 July 1629 at the Castle of Sassuolo - or Rocca de Sassuolo - Antonio was still present in his court and serving him. Months later, on September 8 of that same year, Alfonso III entered the Capuchin Order, wearing the habit and changing his name to Fra' Giambattista da' Modena, at which time Antonio went on to serve Alfonso III's son, the Duke of Modena Francesco I d'Este.

It is at this time that an apogee intensified and a series of improvements began to be demanded by Ferdinand II, Emperor of the Holy Roman Empire, in the castles of Modena as preparation and consequence of the Thirty Years War, but also by the intensification of border fights against the Republic of Lucca. Among these castles, one stands out, the Castle of Trassilico - located in the municipality of Gallicano, on a hill 720 meters above sea level, behind the Apuan Alps, and which was in an advanced state of decay since the end of the 15th century. In 1524, Ludovico Ariosto, comissary of the Estesis in Garfagnana denounced the poor state of the garrison in a letter to the Duke of Este Alfonso I. Even with orders from Francesco I d'Este, the castle had too many problems and the renovation did not materialize.

Francesco I, who admired Antonio, whose family had already lived with the castle court of the d'Este family for some years, thought it a good idea to send Antonio, who was trusted, to lead the renovations in Trassilico as Podestà on 4 March 1631. He was able to concentrate his forces on rebuilding the ruins of the ancient Castle of Fiorano, which would come to fruition in 1634 with a project by the architect Bartolomeo Avanzini, who transformed the place into the Sanctuary of the Blessed Virgine del Castello.

The third child of Antonio and Giovanna Boni was born in Trassilico on 8 July 1631, and as they had small children, it was appropriate for them to live in the area during Antonio's retirement when he acquired many sheep farms. Trassilico was wealthy: There were numerous mineral deposits that could be used to provide components for weapons, large watercourses that provided a source of energy for several flour and chestnut milling, and fertile land for animal husbandry and pasture. Antonio lived there until the completion of the works on 12 February 1635, when he informed Francesco I d'Este that the renovations were finished:

"Most worthy Lord Sovereign Duke of Modena, esteemed and dear Francesco, I confirm that on the current day just before sunset, we completed the reconstruction of the new walls and made the castle more secure as a fortress. I confirm the expenses as equivalent to 2,700 that I have spent out of my own pocket in honor of your name and your house, whom I have always and with great honor loved and will serve. I wait in the tower where I await further directions." - Antonio Corsi

The letter, that can be found in the historical archives of the d'Este family, indicates that although Antonio had been buying property in the area, he had been living in the Castle where he had served as Podestà (medieval Italian equivalent to mayor) since 1631. Shortly thereafter, on 29 May 1635, Duke Francesco I of Modena arranged for Antonio to be declared Marquis of San Pellegrinetto by Ferdinand II of the Holy Roman Empire, and Antonio sought the document signed by both in mid-June, which was delivered by Francesco himself, on which occasion a great banquet was celebrated. This evidences an affection for Antonio, who had taken care of the family for many years. Upon his return to Trassilico, Antonio continued to serve as Podestà of the city, and on behalf of Francesco I, he invested in the creation of a convent with contributions from the d'Este family in Castelnuovo di Garfagnana, a neighboring town from where he also served as Podestà. Antonio oversaw its construction until completion, which took place around 1639. Shortly thereafter, Alfonso III - for whom Antonio was also chamberlain - became ill and was transferred to this convent, coming under the constant observation of Antonio and his family.

Alfonso III died in 1644 and shortly thereafter, in 1646, Antonio ended his activities as Podestà of Trassilico and headed to San Pellegrinetto, a locality where he had property and from where he ascended as Marquis. There he had the last of his daughters, Giulia, who was born on 20 May 1650. Francesco I d'Este died on 14 October 1658, and Antonio attended his funeral's cortège. It is worth noting that by this time Antonio was already 67 years old and an elderly man, but he knew Francesco's successor, Alfonso IV d'Este from his birth, having also helped him in his short reign, which lasted until his death on 16 June 1662.

Gradually moving away from the Este's court, Antonio began to focus on his villa, which was also in need of repair. It was made up of many families, but there were also noble ones, such as the Benelli, Mancini, Battaglia, Magri, and Rossini, who were originally from Florence, like Antonio, and of equally noble backgrounds. It was the Corsi, together with these families, but essentially in the figure of Antonio, who in 1680 built the church of San Pellegrinetto and other structures crucial to the expansion of the town, such as an archive room located to the left of the parish and a cemetery centered near it, where Antonio likely already envisioned being buried in the future. It is, also at this time, that some of the city's baptismal books were inaugurated and stopped being subscribed to neighboring parishes such as Trassilico, Gallicano, and Campolemisi, on whom San Pellegrinetto seemed to be dependent when it was founded in the 14th century.

It is also worth noting that before the Marquisate was granted the town, the latter was also named Alpe de Trassilico, and that when Trassilico was incorporated as a fraction of Gallicano, so was San Pellegrinetto. It is in this core that Antonio died on 16 June 1692, at the age of 100, and his wife Giovanna Boni soon after, on 13 December 1693, at the age of 89. He was buried in the town's newly erected parish, San Pellegrino, Antonio being one of his first burials, succeeded thereafter by his four children: Maria, Antonio, Giulia, and Giovanni, the latter ascending as 2nd Marquis of San Pellegrinetto upon the death of his father.

Since Antonio had a long life, by the time his son Giovanni assumed a leading position in the town the latter was 66 years old. He, who no longer inhabited San Pellegrinetto, as in 1679 he appeared among the largest land investors in the town of Stazzema, returned to the town after the death of his father, being welcomed by his siblings who had started a family there. One of Giovanni's siblings, Giulia, had married Giovanni de Stefano Rossini in 1679, the second most prominent and wealthy family of San Pellegrinetto, whose descendants came into conflict with the Corsi generations ahead.

After his ascension as marquis in 1692, in 1694, Giovanni built houses in the village using stone and wood, focusing essentially on recruiting new families for the expansion of the region, which attracted some branches of the Baldi, Battaglia, Benelli, Celeri, Frati, Galanti, Pelletti and Pierotti, who list as accepted at this time to practice sheep farming on the land granted to him near Via alla Fontana.

As he was already old, Giovanni was unable to do much else before his death, which took place on 11 March 1701, at the age of 75. Of Giovanni's children, the only known lineage is that of his first-born son Antonio, who rose as the 3rd Marquis of San Pellegrinetto after the death of his father. He assumed the leadership of the village at the age of 33, continued the work begun by his father of popularizing the place. It was through Antonio that the village began to exert influence in the region and became notable, as it expanded the formerly small community into the regions called Vetriceto and Ruderi di Vispereglia, now famous for being ghost towns. In addition, Antonio also built a large conglomeration of structures and new houses in Monte Tre, closer to the Gallicano River. He was also known as an investor and traveler, maintaining business contacts and possessions in several Tuscan towns, such as Pietrasanta, Lucca, and Florence, where he commissioned a painting of himself from Cristofano Allori in 1694, son of the painter Alessandro Allori, and grandson of the famous painter Cristofano Allori, from whom the family had been commissioning paintings since at least the early 17th century.

While the Corsi ventured into the acquisition of works of art and properties in other regions and cities, focusing on the expansion of wealth that returned to San Pellegrinetto indirectly with the spread of their prestige, the Rossini family focused on the acquisition and expansion of their properties dedicated to livestock in the town and the construction of several family homes. The Rossini were therefore, in this contest, more numerous, popular, and influential, and had more employees than the Corsi, bringing immediate wealth to the inhabitants. The Rossini's longed for the Marquisate and leadership of the city. All these points of distress were listed several times by Antonio in his letters, who often highlighted and compared his wealth with that of the Rossini family.

By this time the city had already grown in number of people and was no longer a village. This added to the fact that Antonio had to finance an expensive expansion of the church of San Pellegrino to accommodate and support the growing demand. It was at this time that the new neighborhoods of Gallatoio and Col di Luco were born. When Antonio died on 2 May 1744, at the age of 76, he was succeeded by his son, named Giovanni II, 4th Marquis of San Pellegrinetto, who was married to Maria Maddalena Rossini. He died, however, two years later, on 25 May 1746, when the Rossini family regency began through his widow Maria Maddalena (since his three children were still very young).

Under the administration of her son's family assets, Maria Maddalena was responsible for disposing of artwork and family property from 1747 to 1749, which was sold at low prices to her brother, Stefano Rossini, and then resold by him, as recorded in the family administration book. Although Giovanni's children were raised in the Rossini family, the young Corsi still lived with their uncle Stefano Corsi, who accused the Rossini family of appropriating and destroying the family patrimony. Among other reasons, Stefano's arguments were inflamed by the sale in 1748 of one of the Corsi family's oldest sheep farms in San Pellegrinetto to another of Maria Maddalena's brothers, Giovanni Rossini, for 45% less than expected. The constant rivalry was reflected in the sons as well; when Marco began to administer the remaining family property in 1753 at the age of 25 and to ascend de facto as the 5th marquis of the city, he had two of his mother's brothers, Antonio and Felice Rossini, expelled at once.

Since much of the family's profitable local assets had been sold to the Rossini family, Marco focused on expanding his investments in the remaining properties in other towns, such as in the San Martino region of Pietrasanta and Pruno in the town of Stazzema, turning the latter into a profitable farm, which resources he resold to Pietrasanta. Likely in reprisal for the acts committed against the Rossini family, Marco's younger brother Andrea, who ratified his brother's behavior and encouraged it, was found dead on 2 November 1757, after a quarrel with a stranger. Andrea's uncle, Stefano Corsi, and some witnesses, such as Matteo di Luca Mancini, accused Felice Rossini as the author of the murder, which, however, was denied by him, his relatives, and Andrea's mother, Maria Maddalena Rossini. Without any proof beyond the conflicting witness statements, Andrea's tormentor went free, but it was the spark for a conflict between the two families, who began to boycott each other. On 17 November 1762 Marco married Pellegrina of Girolamo Bertone, and in 1769, under the influence of his mother Maria Maddalena, his brother Jacopo married Maria Angiola of Stefano Rossini, his first cousin. As Marco seemed reluctant to yield to the Rossini's ever-increasing demands, the Rossini saw an opportunity to perpetuate their influence through their other son, who seemed to incline to them at an early age. It was in this context that Jacopo promoted an unsuccessful action against his brother Marco about an allegedly undivided property at the Court of Lucca in 1771.

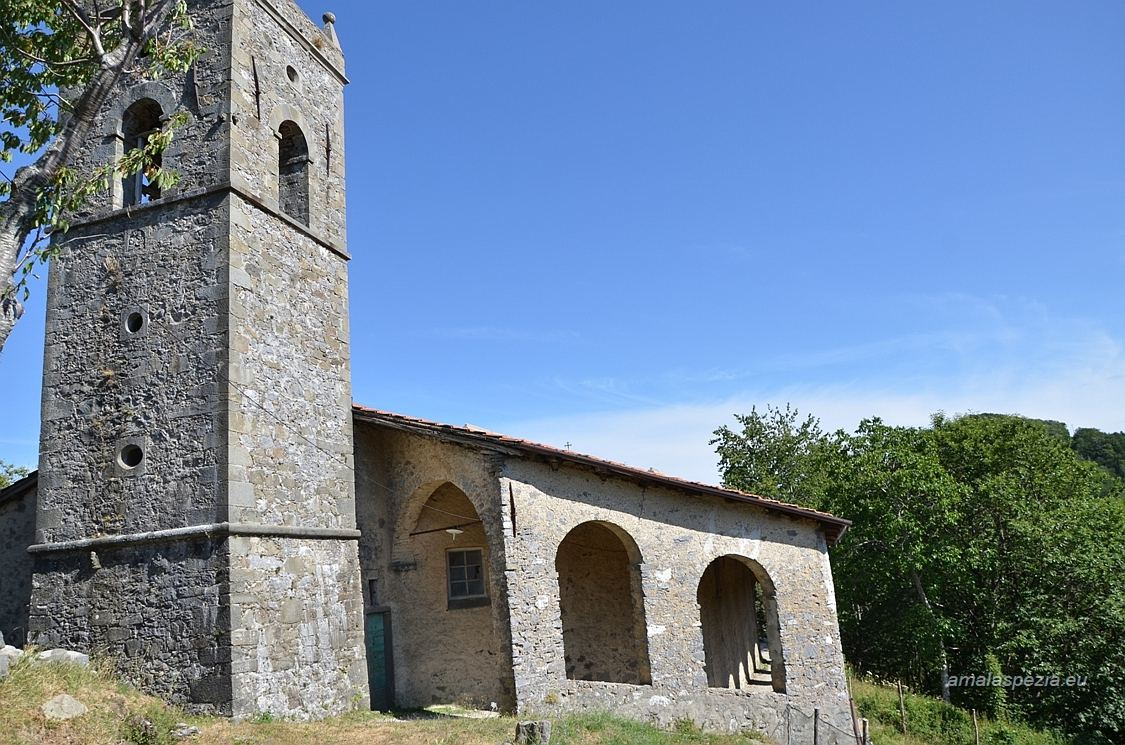
The Chiesa de San Pellegrino today remains with the bell tower that was financed by Marquis Marco Corsi and built in 1786.

As the leader of the town of San Pellegrinetto, Marco doubled down on funding, adding a baptismal font to the parish in 1772 and a bell tower at the rear of the church in 1786. On 16 October 1782 Maria Maddalena Rossini died, but the rivalry between the Corsi and Rossini families continued over the family property until Jacopo Corsi died on 4 January 1804, as he had only one daughter, Maria Giovanna, who had married Marcantonio de Marco Magri. Upon Jacopo's death, the estate reverted to his brother Marco, and litigation over it was settled. Domenico Antonio, born 9 October 1778, whose lineage was extensive, became the last remaining in San Pellegrinetto after the family's immigration to other localities.

Upon Marco's death, his first-born son became Giovanni III, the 6th Marquis of San Pellegrinetto. When Giovanni ascended as marquis, he had already raised offspring and was widowed by his first wife, Maria Domenica Fini, who had been married on 18 March 1788, and was widowed in 1815. As a representative of the city, Giovanni followed in his father's footsteps and sought to expand San Pellegrinetto's relations and commerce. However, unlike Marco, because he no longer felt secure in the locality, he moved to Seravezza, and later to the properties in Pietrasanta that had been in the family since the 17th century.

In Pietrasanta he expanded resources with commerce, especially of animals, and expanded the farm of Pruno in Stazzema, which was dedicated to agriculture, having reverted much of these investments for the development of San Pellegrinetto. On 4 April 1837, already in old age, Giovanni remarried. He and his wife Elisabetta were murdered by apparent poisoning and received honors from the Pieve of Santa Maria Assunta in Stazzema, where they were benefactors and financial backers. The death impacted the family, since, preceded by family wars and intrigues, it resurfaced the idea that they might again be suffering reprisals, even if they were from distant relatives of the Rossini who still inhabited San Pellegrinetto. Giovanni III's firstborn, who ascended as 7th Marquis of San Pellegrinetto, Arcangiolo, born on 10 June 1795, was responsible for disposing of much of the family property surrounding the town of San Pellegrinetto, among which was the farm in Pruno, accumulating wealth that Arcangiolo used to grant loans to former Florentine patricians acting in the field of foreign exchange.

After the main branch of the Corsi family left San Pellegrinetto, the town then came under the exclusive administration of the clergy of the church of San Pellegrino, but it went through difficulties because there was no longer the economic support of the Corsi who financed renovations and the building of new houses, causing a recession from which it never recovered. Of all the older properties, Arcangiolo lived in the only one that remained, located near the parish of San Martino in Pietrasanta, which had been in the family business for many generations. He married Giuditta de Jacopo Pancetti in the San Salvatore Parish in Pietrasanta on 15 September 1819, at the age of 24. Arcangiolo, who was reintegrating himself back into the city of his ancestors, came into contact with a cadet branch whose blood he shared, who were also marquises, but from the town of Caiazzo and recently of Montepescali, a title that had been granted by Grand Duke Ferdinand III in 1819 to Amerigo Corsi, who was a Knight of Malta. He remained in contact with these cadets until at least the late 1830s, having on 25 November 1837 bought one of the titles, the Marquisate of Caiazzo, for 65,000,000 ducats from Francesco and his father Amerigo.

From then on the Marquis Arcangiolo, who was already the 7th of San Pellegrinetto, became also the 10th of Caiazzo. The purchase, however, was likely a matter of rivalry, since both branches of the family had fought for this same title at the beginning of the 17th century when the Arcangiolo branch had at first been defeated. Arcangiolo was not careful in making the purchase, as he used much of the disposable income for his loans. Thus, in 1844, Arcangiolo was declared bankrupt at the age of 49 and accumulated several garnishment actions. His children enlisted as settlers two years later, with the advent of the great Italian diaspora. This phenomenon, which began in the early 19th century, took on even greater force in its final decades, driven mainly by the poverty that was spreading throughout Italy. The Corsi, who had recently gone bankrupt, saw in emigration an opportunity to start over since at that moment their titles lacked buyers. However, although they were enlisted, they had to wait for a summons before they could leave. Arcangiolo did not live long enough to see this departure, as he died on 8 July 1879 in the town of Pietrasanta at the age of 84. He was succeeded by one his five children, Angiolo, 8th Marquis of San Pellegrinetto and 11th Marquis of Caiazzo, born on 22 April 1828.

The signature of Marquis Angiolo Corsi

Angiolo witnessed the beginning of the family decline at a young age, with his father's bankruptcy in 1844 when he was only 16. Three years later he was enlisted along with his family as a settler, and, likely for the benefit of immigration requirements, which favored families over individuals, he married Maria Carolina de Antonio Giovannini on 24 January 1847, at the age of 18. He went on to attend music and art cycles in Florence, where he stood out for his beauty and talent. Numerous painters used Angiolo in their sketches for the improvement of their paintings, among which was the one done in 1862 by Giovanni Boldini, who became a close friend of Angiolo.

It is Angiolo who in 1882 at the age of 54 and having many descendants, changed the inheritance rules of the Marquisate, which had previously been an agnatic primogeniture, to an agnatic ultimogeniture. Since his older sons Oreste, Jacopo, and Giuseppe were already married, with children, and had lost interest in emigrating, Angiolo's solution was to rest his hopes on the younger ones, Lorenzo and Pietro. In 1890, Pietro, who was already the father of four children received permission and the invitation to emigrate where they would be welcomed on a farm called Emboaba, in the city of Ribeirão Preto, in the interior of the state of São Paulo in Brazil.

The signature of Marquis Pietro Corsi

Pietro sold his properties and when his father Angiolo died the following year on 5 October 1891 in the town of Pietrasanta, he asked permission to postpone his departure, which was granted. After Angiolo's burial and Pietro's ascension as 9th Marquis of San Pellegrinetto and 12th of Caiazzo, in early 1896, he left for Genoa with his family, from where the ship would depart to its final destination. The following marquises were all descendants of Pietro, living in Brazil, the current one being Gislaine, 13th Marquise of San Pellegrinetto and 16th of Caiazzo.

=== Modern history ===
A document stating the birth of Maria Annunziata in 1790 shows San Pellegrinetto as Alpe di Trassilico, and another stating the death of Andrea Corsi reveals San Pellegrinetto as dependent on Gallicano in 1807. When Trassilico was incorporated as a fraction of Gallicano, so was San Pellegrinetto. Fabbriche di Vergemoli was established on 1 January 2014 from the merger of the comunes of Fabbriche di Vallico and Vergemoli.

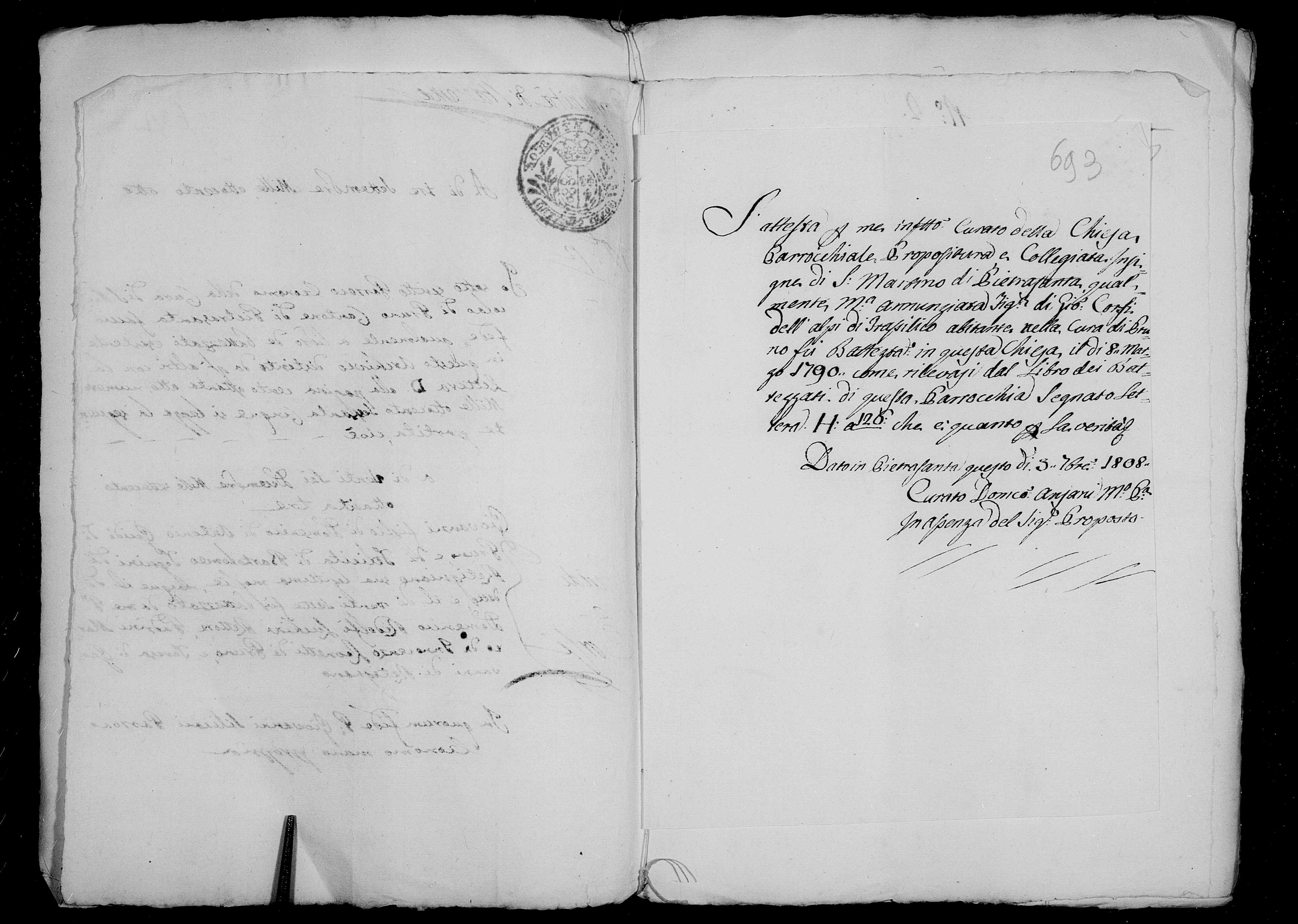
Document mentioning the birth of Maria Annunziata

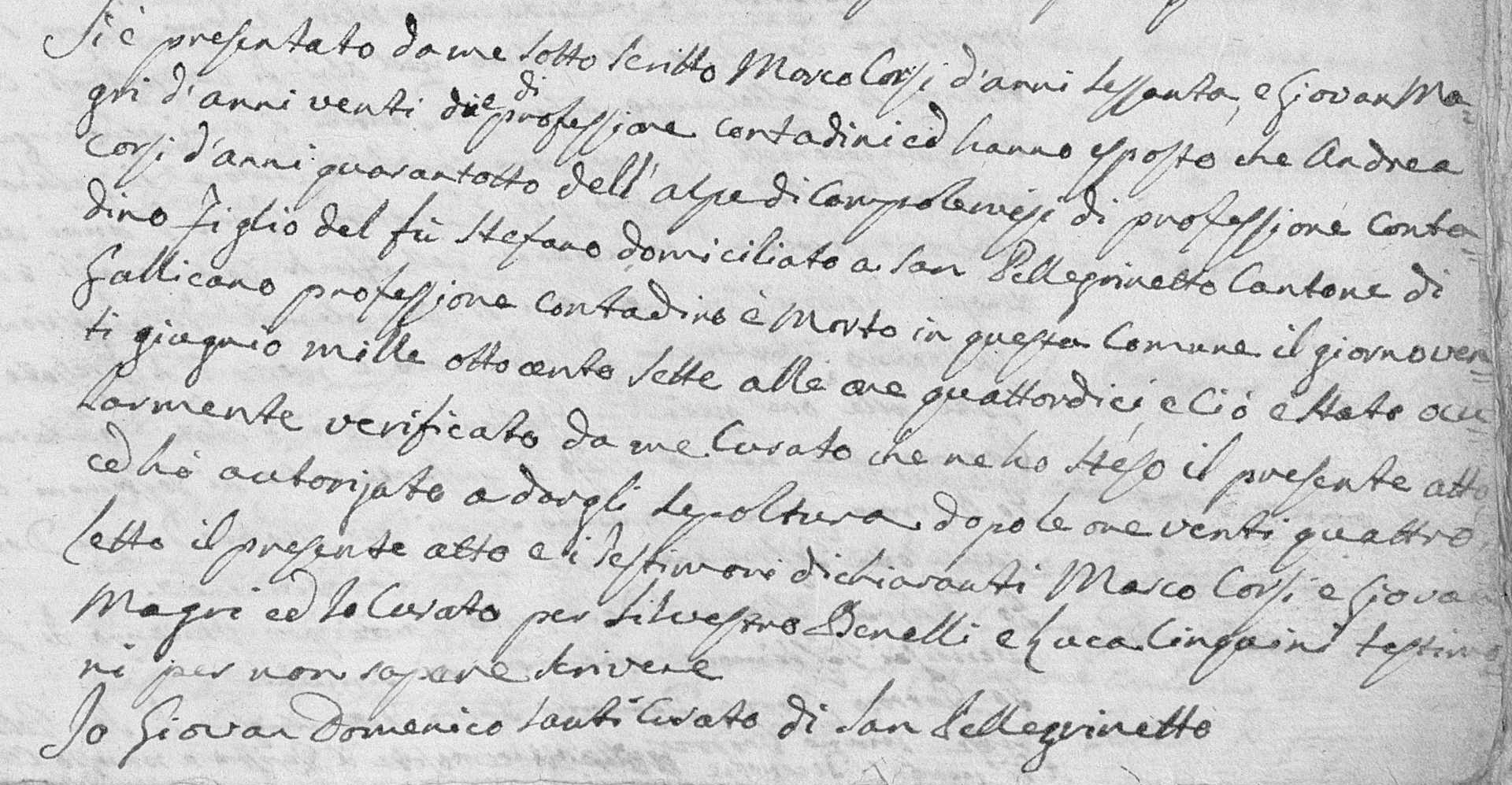
Document stating the death of Andrea Corsi

Since the 1950s, the region, as well as many other regions of Italy, experienced depopulation (due to emigration and a low birth rate), leading the government to launch in 2017 the project “1€ Houses” to encourage immigration through the sale of cheap houses in need of renovation (€1 being a symbolic value).

== General references ==
- Barducci, Roberto; Klapish-Zuber, Christiane; Litchfield, R. Burr; Molho, Anthony; Herlihy, David (2002). Census and Property Survey of Florentine Dominions in the Province of Tuscany, 1427-1480. Rhode Island: Brown University.
- Bonaiuti, Baldassare. Istoria Fiorentina (in Italian).
- Cambi, Giovanni (1785). Istorie di Giovanni Cambi (in Italian). Florence.
- Connell, William J. (2002). Society and Individual in Renaissance Florence. University of California Press.
- De' Courcey-Bayley, Crispin (1998). House and Household: A study of families and property in the Quarter of Santa Croce Florence during the fifteenth century (in Italian). New York: The University of New York.
- Pegazzano, Donatella (2010). Committenza e collezionismo nel cinquecento: La famiglia Corsi a Firenze tra musica e scultura (in Italian).
- Fantoni, Gabrielle (1866). Nuovo durimo italiano ossia compedio di storia d'Italia ne'suoi martire: dalla battaglia di legnano, 1176, fino ai giorni del risorgimento italiano a tutto l'anno 1863 (in Italian).
- Horne, Herbert Percy; Preyer, Brenda (1993). Il Palazzo Corsi-Horne: dal diário di restauro di H.P. Horne (in Italian). Instituto Poligrafico e Zecca dello Stato.
- Kent, Dale V. (1978). The Rise of the Medici: Faction in Florence, 1426-1434. Oxford: Oxford University Press.
- Luzzati, Michele (1971). "BONI, Giovanni". Dizionario Biografico degli Italiani (in Italian).
- Passerini, Luigi (1872). Collezione Passerini – Indice delle famiglie nobili: Sala Manoscritti e Rari, Cataloghi 8 (in Italian). Florence: Biblioteca Nazionale Centrale di Firenze.
- Passerini, Luigi; Tribilli-Giuliani, Demostene (1862). Sommario storico delle famiglia celebri toscane compilato da D. Tiribilli-Giuliani (F. Galvani) riveduto dal cav. L. Passerini (in Italian).
- Passerini, Luigi. Gli Alberti di Firenze: genealogia, storia e documenti (in Italian). Tipi di M. Cellini.
- Rastrelli, Modesto (1783). Priorista fiorentino istorico pubblicato e illustrato (in Italian). Vol. II.
- Razzi, Silvano (1737). Vita di Piero Soderini Gonfaloniere perpetuo della repubblica fiorentina scritta dall'abbate D. Silvano Razzi, monaco camaldolense (in Italian). Stamperia del Seminario.

== Bibliography ==
- Ariosto, Ludovico (1866). Lettere tratte dall'archivio di Stato in Modena com prefazione, documenti e note per cura di Antonio Cappelli (in Italian).
- Concioni, Graziano (2001). Matteo Civitali nei documenti d'archivio (in Italian). Lucca: Accademia lucchese di scienze, lettere e arti.
- Corsi, Vinci (2022). Corsi (in Brazilian Portuguese). Ribeirão Preto: UICLAP. ISBN 978-65-00-51077-5.
- Ferri, Claudio (1988). I Pittori Rinascimentali a Lucca. Vita, Opere, Committenza (in Italian). Lucca: Cassa di Risparmio di Lucca.
