= Magri =

Magri is an Italian and Maltese surname. It may refer to:

- Alberto Magri (1896–1972), Judge, Lawyer, Politician, and Philanthropist.
- Carlo Magri (1617–1693), Priest, Scholar, and Dramatist
- Charlie Magri (b. 1956), English boxer
- Count Primo Magri (1849–1920), American entertainer
- Domenico Magri (1604–1672), Roman Catholic priest and Scholar
- Edoardo Magri (1908–1998), Judge, Olympian, Author
- John Magri (b. 1941), Maltese cyclist
- Jonathan Magri Overend (b. 1970), Maltese footballer
- Kevin Magri (b. 1995), Italian footballer
- Lucio Magri (1932–2011), Italian journalist
- Maher Magri (b. 1986), Tunisian footballer
- Manuel Magri (1851–1907), Maltese ethnographer
- Mayara Magri (b. 1994), Brazilian ballet dancer
- Pierluigi Magri (b. 1940), Italian footballer
- Sam Magri (b. 1994), footballer

== See also ==
- 9541 Magri, asteroid
- Claudio Magris, Italian scholar
- Moti Magri, Indian city
- mAgri an abbreviation for Mobile agriculture
