= Gallicano =

- Comune
- Comune di Gallicano
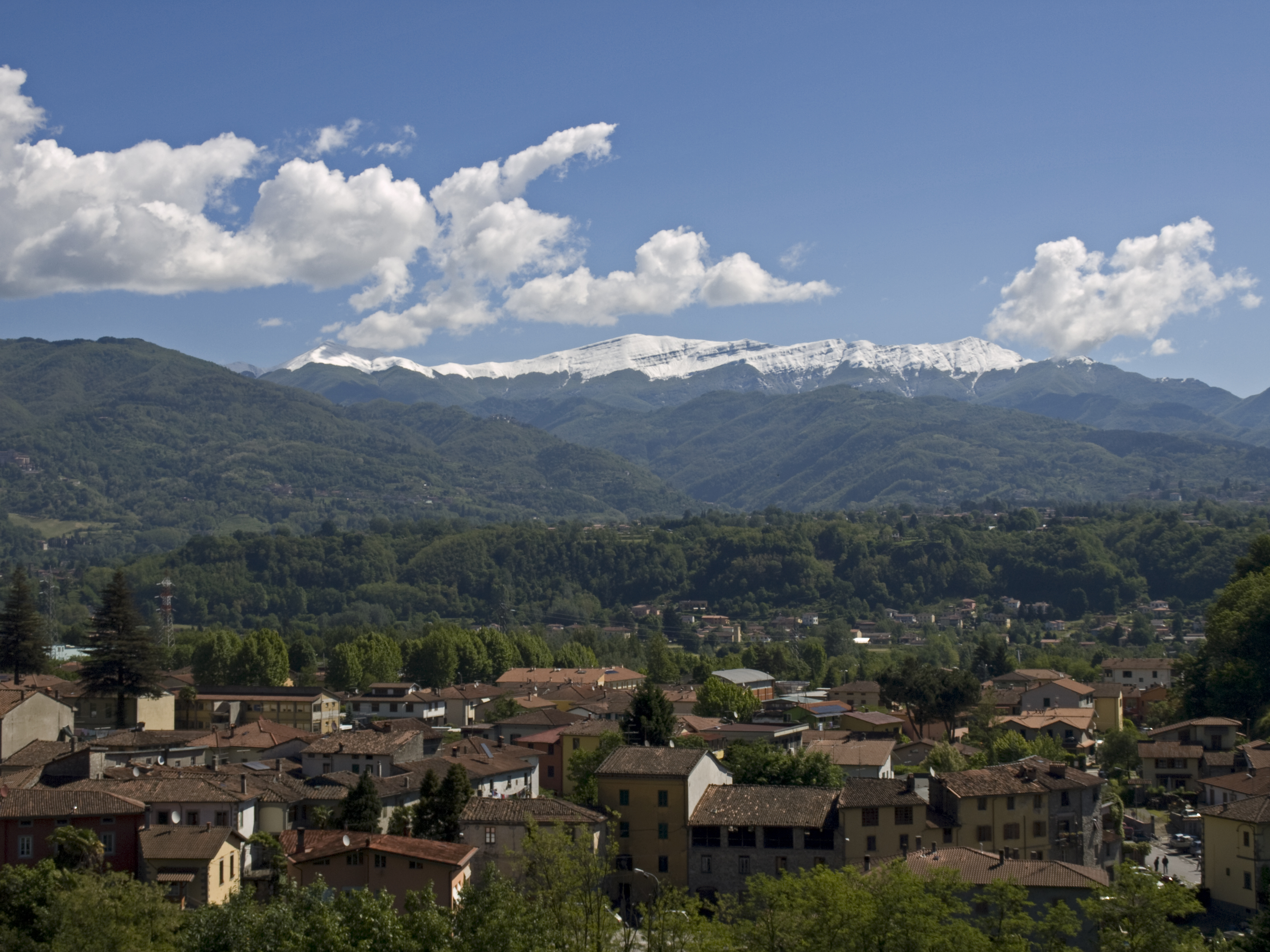
- Panorama of Gallicano from the cathedral

- Coat of arms

- Location within Italy Location within Tuscany
- Coordinates: 44°4′N 10°26′E
- Country: Italy
- Region: Tuscany
- Province: Lucca (LU)
- Frazioni: Trassilico

Government
  - Mayor: David Saisi

Area
  - Total: 30.5 km^{2} (11.8 sq mi)
- Elevation: 186 m (610 ft)

Population (31 March 2017)
  - Total: 3,774
  - Density: 124/km^{2} (320/sq mi)
- Demonym: Gallicanesi
- Time zone: UTC+1 (CET)
  - Summer (DST): UTC+2 (CEST)
- Postal code: 55027
- Dialing code: 0583
- Website: Official website

Gallicano is a comune (municipality) in the Province of Lucca in the Italian region Tuscany, located about 70 kilometres (43 mi) northwest of Florence and about 25 kilometres (16 mi) northwest of Lucca.

The municipality is located in Serchio Valley, on the west bank of the Serchio river. It is served by Barga-Gallicano railway station located on the opposite side of the river, accessible by a bridge built in 1923.

Gallicano borders the following municipalities: Barga, Borgo a Mozzano, Castelnuovo di Garfagnana, Coreglia Antelminelli, Fabbriche di Vallico, Fosciandora, Molazzana, Fabbriche di Vergemoli.

== Main sights ==
- The Rocca (Castle) of Trassilico.
- Church of San Giovanni Battista
- Church of Sant'Andrea
- Church of San Jacopo Apostolo
- Church of Santa Lucia
