= Latino Latini =

Italian scholar and humanist

Latino Latini (Latinus Latinius) (Viterbo, ca. 1513 – 21 January 1593) was an Italian scholar and humanist. Latini was a member of the commission for the revision of the Corpus Juris canonici. He is known for his lifelong research into the texts of the Fathers of the church and his critical editions of their works, including those of Cyprian. He published notes on Tertullian and worked on the text of Quintilian.

== Life ==
Latini studied jurisprudence and belles-lettres at Siena. In 1552, he took holy orders at Rome. A poor man, he was obliged to find a patron and entered the service of Cardinal Pozzo, for whom he was Latin secretary. He then became librarian to Cardinal Rudolfo Pio. Pio died in 1564, leaving his extensive library to Latini. He then worked for Cardinals Farnese and Colonna.

He superintended the production of the classic Roman edition of the Septuagint version of the Bible, which appeared in 1587. He reformed the decretal of Gratian, at the wish of Pope Pius IV, which was published under Gregory XIII.

After his death, the chapter of the Cathedral of Viterbo acquired Latini's important library, which contained many annotated copies. His letters and papers are still there today.

He published nothing under his own name in his lifetime. Two works appeared posthumously. The first was a volume of letters (Epistolæ...). The other was Bibliotheca sacra et profana, sive observationes, correctiones, conjecturae, et variae lectiones. This book contains his collected philological and critical remarks to textual editions of various classical authors in an edition edited by Domenico Magri (1604–1672). The work contains a biography of Latini by Malgri.

He knew John Annius, the forger of classical texts and artefacts. His letters were published and include many of the humanists of his day, including Andreas Masius. One of those to Masius, written in January 1559 deplores the potential effect of the new Roman Index of prohibited books (1559), issued by Pope Paul IV, on scholarship:

"Why should you be planning for the publication of any new works at a time when nearly all the books which have thus far appeared (qui adhuc sunt editi) are being taken away from us? It seems to me that at least for some years to come, no one among us will dare to write anything but letters. There has just been published an Index of the books which, under penalty of excommunication, we are no longer permitted to possess. The number of those prohibited (particularly of works originating in Germany) is so great that there will remain but few. On this ground, I advise you to put to one side your variants of the Bible and the translation of Demosthenes. Faernus has been devoting some days to the 'purifying' of his library; I shall begin to-morrow going over my own collection so that nothing may be found in it which is not authorised. Should I describe the process as a shipwreck or a holocaust of literature? In any case this [censorship] must have the result of deterring many of your group from the production of books, and will serve as a warning to the printers to be cautious in making selections for their presses."

However, the death of Paul IV later in the same year lifted the threat.

== Bibliography ==
- Epistolæ, Coniecturæ, & Obseruationes Sacra, Profanaque Eruditione Ornatæ. Ex Bibliotheca Cathedralis Vterbienses a Dominico Magro Melitensi eiusdem ecclesiæ Canonico Theologo. Studio, ac triennali labore collectæ, prodeunt in lucem publicæ studiforum utilitati ... D. Francicu Mariæ cardinalis Brancacchi. (Part 1). Rome, Nicolai Angeli Tinassi, 1659, 396 p.. A second part was published in Wittemberg 1667.

== Sources ==
- Joseph Robertson, The Parian Chronicle, Or The Chronicle of the Arundelian Marbles (1788), p.210-11. online here
- John Platts, A Universal Biography: Containing Interesting Accounts..., vol. 5, (1826) p. 559. Online here
- Pierre Petitmengin, Latino Latini, une longue vie au service des Pères de l'Eglise, In: Humanisme et Église en Italie et en France méridionale : 15. siècle-milieu du 16. siècle Series: Collection de l'École française de Rome vol. 330 (2004) pages 381–407
