= Vergemoli =

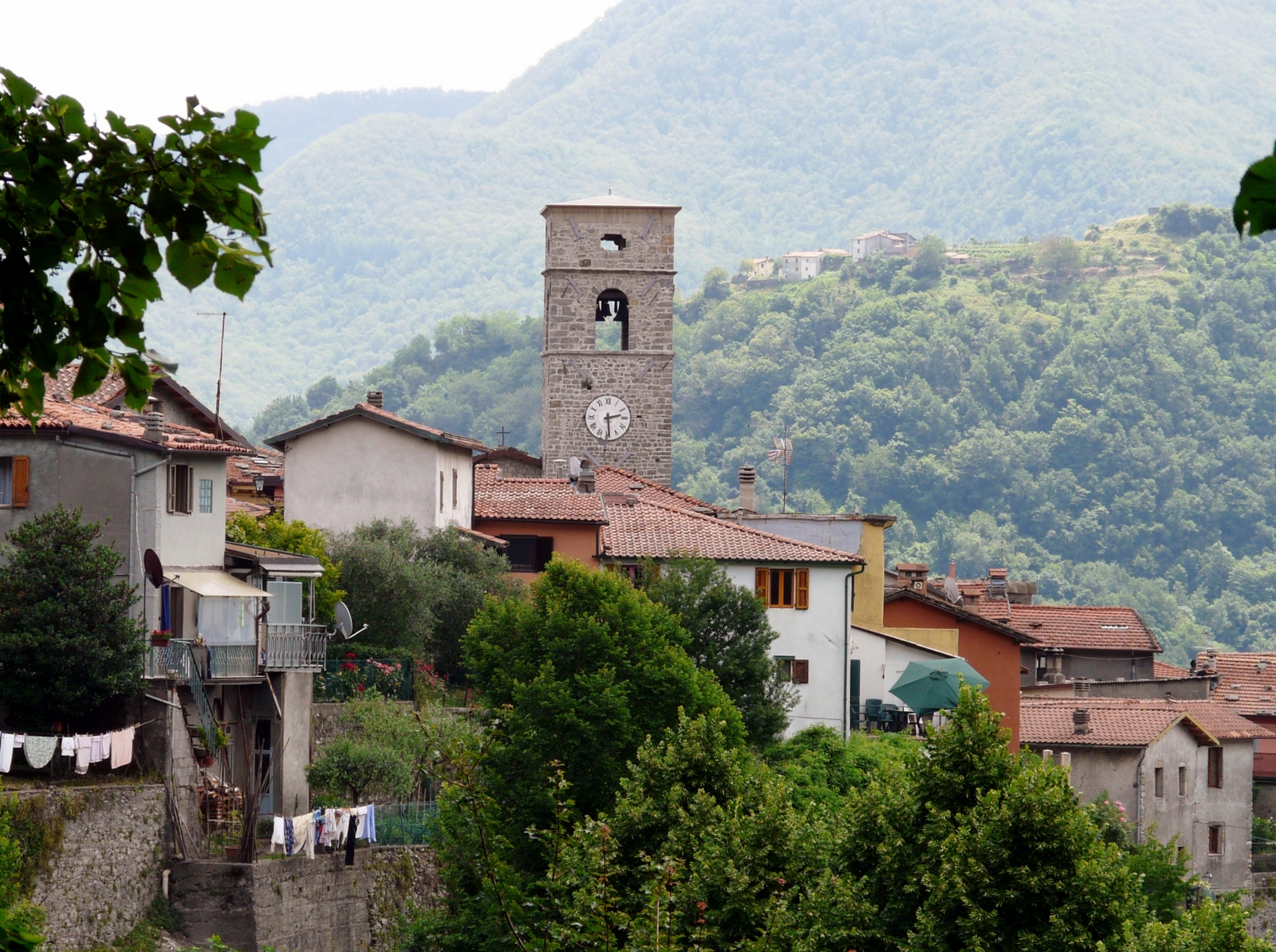
Vergemoli

Vergemoli was a comune (municipality) in the Province of Lucca in the Italian region Tuscany, located about 80 kilometres (50 mi) northwest of Florence and about 25 kilometres (16 mi) northwest of Lucca. On 1 January 2014 it was merged with Fabbriche di Vallico in the new comune of Fabbriche di Vergemoli.
