= San Giovanni Battista, Gallicano =

Church in Gallicano, Italy

Coordinates: 44.0608°N 10.4355°E

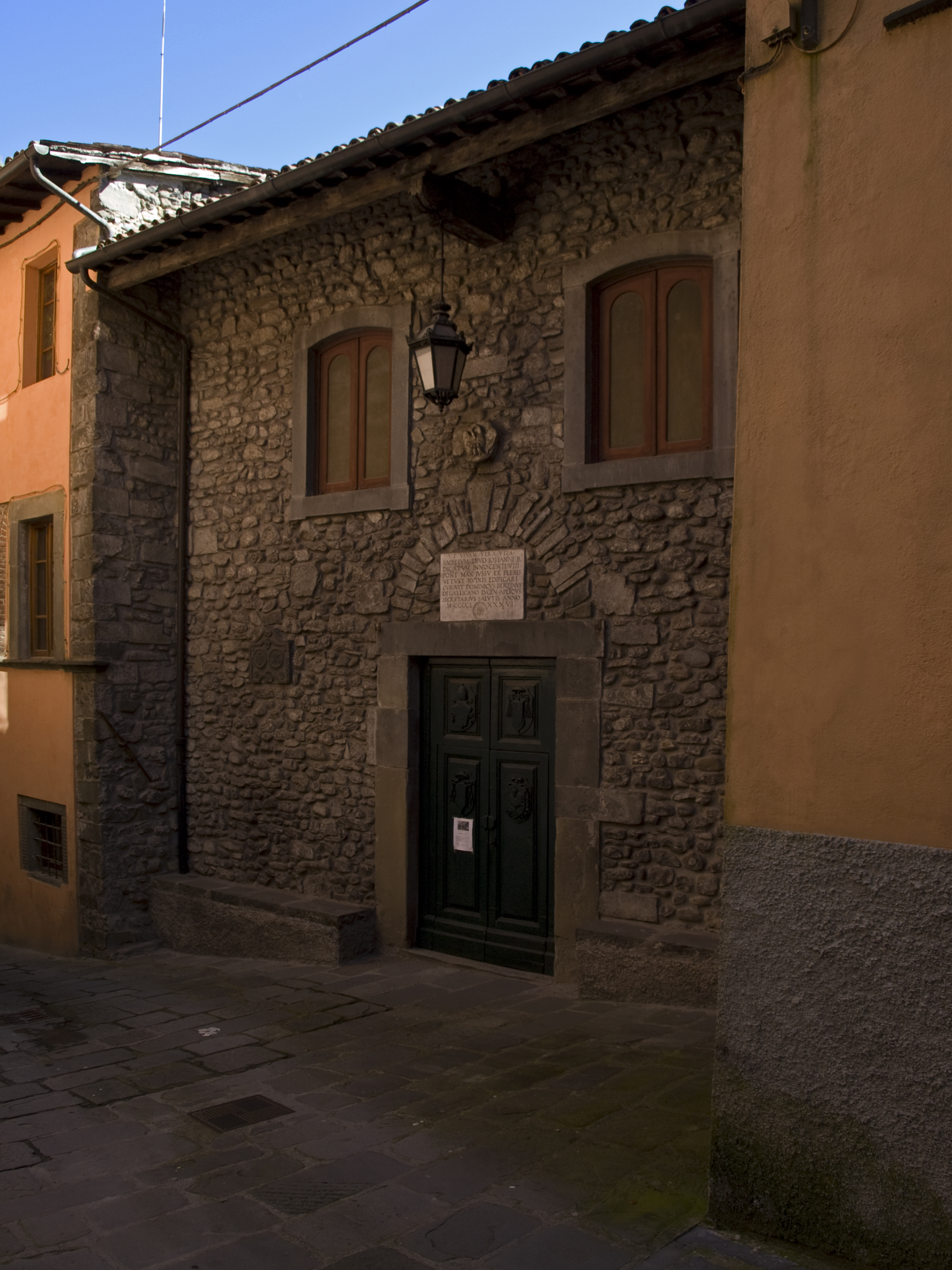
The entrance

San Giovanni Battista is a 15th-century Roman Catholic church building in the town of Gallicano, province of Lucca, region of Tuscany, Italy.

Construction began in 1486, using material from the former parish church. The site had once had a small oratory commissioned by Domenico Bertini, a papal diplomat.
