= Girolamo Brusoni =

Italian Baroque writer

Girolamo Brusoni (1614 – after 1686) was an Italian Baroque writer. He was originally a Carthusian monk, but ran away from the order and was imprisoned.

== Biography ==
Girolamo Brusoni was born in Badia Polesine in 1614. He studied the humanities at Ferrara and graduated in philosophy at the University of Padua. Having entered the Carthusians, he ran away from the convent no less than three times. Forgiven for the first evasion, he was arrested after the second. Whilst a prisoner in Venice, he received from a friend a manuscript copy of a satire, entitled, La Maschera Scoperta, written by the father Angelico Aprosio of Ventimiglia against Arcangela Tarabotti. Brusoni, who was in great distress, copied the work and sent it to her. Thanks to powerful and influential friends, Tarabotti was able to block the publication of the text. This fact brought to an end the friendship between Brusoni and Aprosio. Aprosio wrote a defence of his work which contained the most bitter charges against Brusoni; and it seems that others, too, published still more violent satires against him, amongst which is a volume of about 200 pages, entitled Il Rovescio di Girolamo Brusoni. After recovering his liberty, he lived for a long time in Venice, where he became a member of the Accademia degli Incogniti with the pseudonym of Aggirato and befriended Ferrante Pallavicino. Later, Brusoni wrote a short biography of his friend, which was included in the latter's posthumous edition of selected works.

From 1676 to 1686, he served the House of Savoy as a historiographer. The year of his death is not known.

== Works ==
He wrote a wide variety of literary, historical, and political works, mostly during his time in the Accademia degli Incogniti. Of the large number of his works, of which Mazzucchelli gives the catalogue, fifty-one have been printed. Amongst them there are:

- La Fuggitiva, Venice, 1640. This is a novel in four books, in which, under feigned names, are related the adventures of Pellegrina Bonaventuri, daughter of the famous Bianca Cappello, and wife of Count Ulisse Bentivoglio Manzoli, a nobleman of Bologna.
- II Camerotto, Venice, 1645, a collection of prose and verse, of facetious nature, divided into three parts, written by him during his imprisonment at Venice, where the prisons are so-called.
- II perfetto Elucidario Poetico, Lovisa, 1712.
- Historia dell'ultima guerra tra Veneziani e Turchi, nella quale si contengono i successi delle passate guerre nei regni di Candia e Dalmazia, dall'anno 1644 fino al 1671, Venice, 1673. It has passed, with additions, through several editions. Against the work, in which Brusoni had spoken ill of the knights of Malta, Carlo Magri wrote a work, entitled, Il Valor Maltese difeso contro le Calunnie di Girolamo Brusoni, Roma, 1667.
- Lettera sopra un Libello infame, intitolato, L'Onore Riparato dalla Verità, a Difesa d'Angelo Tarachia già Segretario di Stato e di presente carcerato ed inquisito di materie atroci di Maestà lesa, Mantua, without any date. In this letter, Brusoni tried to contradict the charge of having been one of the calumniators of Angelo Tarachia, secretary of state of the Duke of Mantua Charles II Gonzaga, who, though innocent, had been imprisoned and accused of high treason.
- La Vita di Ferrante Pallavicini, published in Venice, 1651, under Brusoni's academic name of Aggirato.
- La gondola a tre remi (The Three-Oared Gondola, 1657); Il carozzino alla moda (The Fashionable Carriage, 1658); and La peota smarrita (The Lost Boat, 1662). This trilogy of novels, whose protagonist, the Venetian patrician Glisomiro, is an autobiographical projection of the author, is considered Brusoni's masterpiece.

== Bibliography ==
- Rose, Hugh James (1848). "Brusoni (Girolamo)". A new general biographical dictionary. Vol. 5. Fellowes. p. 162.
- De Caro, Gaspare (1972). "BRUSONI, Girolamo". Dizionario Biografico degli Italiani (in Italian). Vol. 14: Branchi–Buffetti. Rome: Istituto dell'Enciclopedia Italiana. ISBN 978-88-12-00032-6.
- Capucci, M. (2002). "Brusoni, Girolamo". The Oxford Companion to Italian Literature. Oxford University Press.
