= San Jacopo Apostolo, Gallicano =

Church in Gallicano, Italy

Coordinates: 44°3′35″N 10°26′11″E

San Jacopo Apostolo is a Romanesque-style Roman Catholic parish church located on via Domenico Bertini # 26 in the town of Gallicano, Province of Lucca, region of Tuscany, Italy.

A church at the site was documented in 771. By the tenth century it was recognized as a collegiate church. The church layout of today was built in the 11th century. The church was initially linked to the mountaintop castle, but it moved to being a parish church. In 1485, it was reconstructed using material form the abandoned church of San Giovanni.
