= Santa Lucia, Gallicano =

Roman Catholic Church in Gallicano, Italy

Coordinates: 44°3′20.8″N 10°27′3.7″E

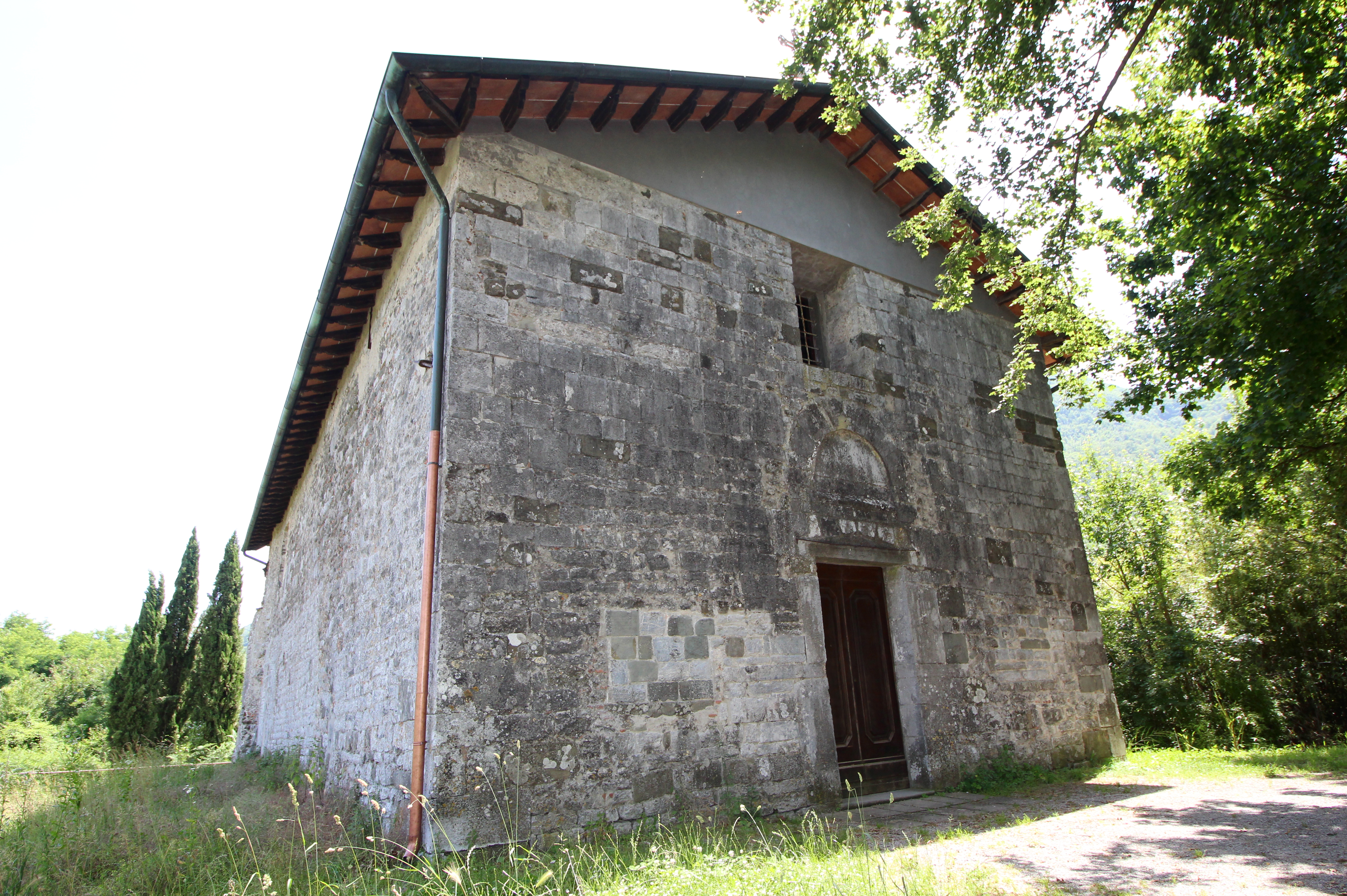
The church of Santa Lucia in Gallicano

Santa Lucia is a Roman Catholic church in the town of Gallicano, region of Tuscany, Italy.

The church is documented in the 12th century as being under the control of the Abbey of Frassinoro. It was located near the castle and close to the ancient parish church of Santi Giovanni e Cassiano. An earthquake in 1721 compelled reconstruction. The interior has a 16th-century wooden icon of St Lucy.
