= Ferrante Pallavicino =

Italian writer (1615–1644)

- Born: 23 March 1615; Piacenza, Duchy of Parma
- Died: 5 March 1644 (aged 28); Avignon, Papal States
- Occupations: Writer, novelist
- Family: Pallavicini family
- Writing career
- Pen name: Sinifacio Spironcini

Ferrante Pallavicino (23 March 1615 – 5 March 1644) was an Italian writer of numerous antisocial and obscene stories and novels with biblical and profane themes, lampoons and satires in Venice which, according to Edward Muir, "were so popular that booksellers and printers bought them from him at a premium." Pallavicino's scandalous satires, which cost him his head at the age of twenty-eight, were all published under pseudonyms or anonymously.

== Early life ==
Pallavicino was born in Piacenza, a member of the old Italian family of the Pallavicini. He received a good education at Padua and elsewhere, and early in life entered the Augustinian order, residing chiefly in Venice. For a year he accompanied the general Ottavio Piccolomini in his German campaigns as field chaplain, and in 1641, shortly after his return, he published a number of clever but exceedingly scurrilous satires on the Roman Curia and on the powerful house of the Barberini, held together by the frame story expressed in its title, Il Corriero svaligiato ("The Post-boy Robbed of his Bag"). In this novella published in 1641, four courtiers read and comment on a post-bag of letters that their noble master has ordered stolen from a courier, which include some political ones written by the Spanish governor of Milan. The basis of his story allowed Pallavicino to express a number of divergent opinions, which included those critical of contemporary rulers in Italy, who included Pope Urban VIII Barberini, "the barber who cut the beard of Christ"; the Jesuits, who were attempting to monopolize all education and intellectual life; the Roman Inquisition, which ruined publishers through its prosecutions; and the Spanish, who at the time occupied parts of Italy. "The only powers to escape condemnation in the letters", according to Muir, "were the valiant republics, Genoa, Lucca, and especially Venice, which had managed to maintain political independence."

The reaction to this work was immediate: the papal nuncio to Venice, Francesco Vitelli, demanded Pallavicino's arrest; although the writer spent six months in prison, his allies kept him from being tried. In March 1642, the pro-papal party in the Venetian Senate proposed legislation to banish Pallavicino and forbid the sale of Il Corriero, but despite receiving four votes the measure failed to pass. In spite of these successes, after his release from prison Pallavicini was persecuted by the papal nuncio and Francesco Barberini, Pope Urban's nephew. "Twice Pallavicino was forced to leave his monastery and take refuge with Loredan," writes Muir, "and during the summer of 1642 he escaped Venice, traveling home to Parma, to Friuli, and back to Parma, only to return in August to see a woman."

== Later career ==
Despite these travails, Pallavicino continued his satiric attacks on the Pope. In the 18 months following the publication of Il Corriero, he wrote four more books. In 1642 appeared his Baccinata ouero battarella per le api barberine, a "Drumming against the Barberini bees, on the occasion of Our Lord Pope Urban the Eighth taking up arms against Parma" in the First War of Castro against Odoardo Farnese, duke of Parma and Castro. It was the country folk's practice to make a racket on pots and pans (baccinata) in order to disperse a swarm of bees — the heraldic emblem of the Barberini — that were settling in an undesirable place. The Baccinata took the form of a letter to Francesco Vitelli, papal nuncio at Venice, comparing the papal actions unfavourably with those of Christ:

Christ shed his own blood, and Our Lord sheds the blood of others and promises eternal life to those who shed the most Christian blood... and if the shepherd is only permitted a thin rod with which to control the sheepfold, or better still, nothing at all, as Christ said to the Apostles, 'Do not carry any rod with you on the way', what can be said of Our Lord and Pastor, who scatters the herd of the Church with swords, guns, arquebuses and cannons?"

Even more notorious was La Retorica delle puttane ("The Rhetoric of Whores"), which Muir describes as a "scandalous anti-Jesuit work", which "demonstrates why Pallavicino was the only Italian author of his epoch capable of a coherent vision that integrated satire, skepticism, and naturalistic morality." La Retorica is written in the form of a dialogue between an aged prostitute and her naive apprentice. The older woman is sick, poor, and miserable because, she explains, she "did not know to stop at rhetoric, wanting to go on to learn philosophy." Muir explains, "By 'rhetoric,' she means the arts of simulation and dissimulation, which would have brought her pleasure and riches, without danger, while philosophy, with its pretension to discovering truth, has brought her the ruin of emotional authenticity." The fifteen lessons of the old whore were based on Cypriano de Soarez's De arte rhetorica, the manual used in Jesuit schools. Muir pointedly notes, "By systematically pursuing the parallels between rhetorical persuasion and erotic seduction, Pallavicino demonstrates how the high art of rhetoric has the same instrumental character as the lowly deceptions of the prostitute."

La Retorica delle puttane (1643) proved to be a step too far, and in the autumn of 1643 Pallavicino had to flee Venice for Bergamo, where he completed the first volume of his last work, Il Divortio celeste ("The Celestial Divorce"), published in 1643, which Muir reports "came to be known, in the words of a contemporary, as 'superior to all others in impiety and blasphemies against the Roman Church.'" In this proposed trilogy, Pallavicino had portrayed Jesus Christ as seeking to divorce himself from the Roman Catholic Church (widely known then as the "bride of Christ"), for committing intolerable adulteries and for living a sinful life. God then sends Saint Paul to investigate these claims, and based on his findings, he recommends that Christ's request be granted. Although the only completed volume of the series ends at this point, according to Muir the story was continued "with an account of how Luther, Calvin, and Mark of Ephesus (the 15th-century Greek theologian who had opposed the unification of the Greek and Roman churches) offered their own churches as the new bride of Christ. After considering their suitability for matrimony, Christ was to have demurred, stating that he did not intend to wed any of the existing churches." A copy of Pallavicino's manuscript found its way to Geneva, where it was published. Il Divortio became a sensation in Italy (where Muir notes it was sold "under the counter"), and was plagiarized in Protestant countries, where German, Swedish, French, Dutch and English translations appeared.

== Death and legacy ==
It was in Bergamo that the son of an Italian bookseller in Paris, Charles de Breche – who, as a paid agent of the Barberini had befriended Pallavicino a few years before – convinced him that Cardinal Richelieu greatly admired his works and wanted to commission Pallavicino to serve as the cardinal's official historian if he were to come to France. Despite the fact that Richelieu died while the two were en route to Paris, de Breche convinced Pallavicino to continue the journey, and as they were crossing one of the bridges at Orange in the neighborhood of Avignon, a papal enclave within France, there de Breche betrayed him to the local papal authorities. After fourteen months' imprisonment, during which time he wrote a letter to Francesco Barberini, begging for clemency but also during which his Il Divortio was also published in Geneva, with unlucky timing, Pallavicino was beheaded at Avignon.

His enemies did not long survive Pallavicino. Five months later, Pope Urban was dead; within two years de Breche was stabbed to death in Paris by a certain Ganducci, but as Muir comments, "whether or not in revenge for Pallavicino's death is unknown." When a brief life was appended to a selection of his works that included a continuation of the Corriero, the author, Girolamo Brusoni, remained discreetly anonymous. Pallavicino's scandalous reputation continued until the end of the century and inspired satires of Antonio Lupis, Carlo Moscheni, Gregorio Leti and Alain René Lesage. Often a free-thinking individual named "Ferrante" appears in their satiric dialogues.

== Other writings ==
Pallavicino was a prolific writer in his truncated career. A bibliography of his scattered works and ephemera and a rigorous chronology of their numerous reprints and translations was compiled by Laura Coci, "Bibliografia di Ferrante Pallavicino", Studi secenteschi 24 (1983:221-306).

- Le due Agrippine
- La taliclea
- La Rete di Vulcano
- Le bellezze dell'anima
- Il Giuseppe
- La Susanna
- Il principe hermafrodito
- La Bersabea
