= Sant'Andrea, Gallicano =

Church in Gallicano, in Tuscany, Italy

Coordinates: 44°03′28″N 10°25′43″E

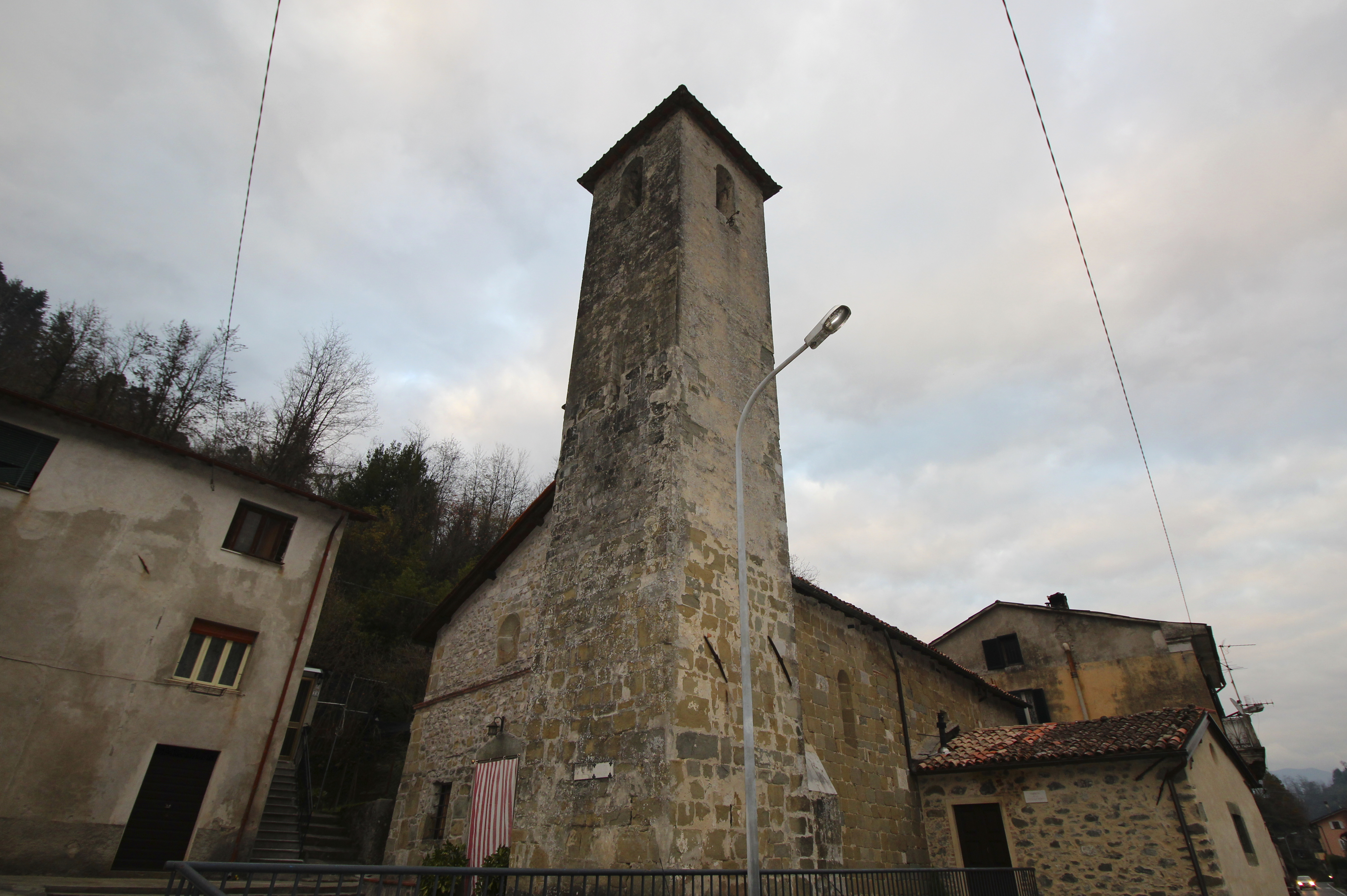
The church of Sant'Andrea in Gallicano

Sant'Andrea is a 12th-century Roman Catholic church building in the town of Gallicano, province of Lucca, region of Tuscany, Italy.

== History ==
The church was initially built outside the city walls, on a road towards the valley. Subsequent reconstructions have altered the medieval structure, but not the layout.
