= Carlo Magri =

17th-century Maltese priest and writer (1617-1693)

- Born: 1617
- Died: October 25, 1693 (aged 75–76); Gozo
- Resting place: Cathedral of the Assumption, Victoria
- Parents: Luigi Magri (father); Susanna née Casauro (mother)

Carlo Magri (c. 1617 – 25 October 1693) (nom-de-plume Marco Largi) was a Maltese priest, scholar, and dramatist. He served as the Archpriest of the Cathedral of the Assumption, Victoria and spearheaded its reconstruction after a major earthquake. He published dramatic works in Italy under a pseudonym, and was also appointed as the first Primo Custode (Head Librarian or Prefect) of the Biblioteca Alessandrina.

== Early life and education ==
Carlo Magri is believed to have been born around 1617 to Luigi Magri and Susanna née Casauro. Records indicate he had a Maltese father and an Italian mother. He began his education at the Jesuit College in Valletta (Collegium Melitense) before moving to Rome to continue his studies.

== Ecclesiastical career in Rome ==
Magri continued his studies at the Pontifical Urban College (Pontificio Collegio Urbano de Propaganda Fide) in Rome, he was ordained a priest on 5 July 1643. He furthered his education at the same university, where he earned a Doctorate in utroque iure (in both civil and canon law). During this period, he was also appointed a Protonotario Apostolico (Apostolic Protonotary) and was elected as a prelate to the Roman Curia (Curia romana).

In 1667, he was appointed as the first Primo Custode (Head Librarian or Prefect) of the Biblioteca Alessandrina, the main library of the Sapienza University of Rome, founded by Pope Alexander VII.

== Return to Gozo and archpriesthood ==
Magri returned to Malta around 1680–1681, reportedly due to declining eyesight. He was appointed Archpriest of the Gozo Matrice (Cathedral of the Assumption, Victoria), the primary church on the island of Gozo, by Apostolic Letters dated 10 February 1681.

Upon his appointment, the church building was in a state of disrepair. Magri proposed constructing a new church and engaged the architect Lorenzo Gafà for its design. The project gained the support of Bishop Davide Cocco Palmieri.

Before construction began, the old church structure was severely damaged in an earthquake on 11 January 1693. Magri died before the new building project advanced. The foundation stone for the new church was laid on 21 September 1697 by his successor, Fr. Nicolò-Natale Cassia-Magri, and it was officially opened on 14 August 1711. The building was consecrated on 11 October 1716.

== Literary works and pseudonym ==
Magri is recognised as the first Maltese author to have his plays published in Italy. Among Magri's most important works are two comedies, both written under the anagrammatic pseudonym Marco Largi: the first in 1672, titled La regia e un sogno, ovvero La Costanza; the second in 1674, titled Chi la dura la vince, ovvero Teodolinda. The first of the two achieved greater success, not only in Italy but also in other European countries.

Beyond his dramatic work, his output also includes a Latin translation and expansion of Hierolexicon (1677), a theological dictionary written by his brother, Domenico Magri; a pamphlet defending Maltese valour - specifically the Knights of Jerusalem based in Valletta - against the criticisms of Girolamo Brusoni; and a letter to Abbot Cornelio Margarini concerning paintings from the seventh century onward.

== Death and legacy ==
Carlo Magri died in Gozo on 25 October 1693, his remains are interred in the Cathedral of the Assumption, Victoria. His initiatives led to the construction of the current Gozo Cathedral, and his dramatic works are considered examples of Maltese literary activity in the 17th century.
