= Pierluigi Magri =

Italian footballer

Pierluigi Magri (born 14 March 1940 in Brescia) is a retired Italian footballer that played in the role of central midfielder. After playing in Aurora Travagliato youth teams he began his professional career in Serie B with Brescia. After two seasons with them he was loaned to teams in lower series.

== Career ==
1959–1961 Brescia 30 (2)
1961–1962 → Varese 22 (?)
1962–1963 → Lecce 17 (?)
1963–1964 Rizzoli Milano 25 (?)
1964–1969 Marzotto Valdagno ? (?)
1969–1972 Alessandria 101 (3)
