= Mobile agriculture =

Mobile Agriculture (mAgri) supports actors along the agriculture value chain through the use of mobile technology. Mobile technology covers a broad range of devices and the sub-categories include voice, data, network and connectivity technologies. mAgri is a subset of e-agriculture.

The introduction of mobile technology and portable, wireless devices has led to the creation of innovative services and applications that are used within the agricultural value chain in developed and developing countries. In developed markets where mechanization is more advanced and the agricultural labour force is significantly smaller than that of many developing countries, mobile agriculture applications tend to be implemented further up the value chain, for example with processors or consumers. In developing countries where a large proportion of the workforce is employed in agriculture, mobile technology is more commonly used to deliver services for producers and traders.

== Applications ==
The GSMA's Mobile and Development Impact (MDI), an open data portal on mobile and development, has created a standard set of categories that cover applications of mobile technology in agriculture. The MDI categories were created to provide an overview of the mAgri industry and the range of mobile applications in agriculture across the world, with a focus on emerging markets. The categories listed below serve a role in the mAgri industry by providing a common framework and a standardized naming system.

=== Examples ===
Instances of the technology include:

- Market intelligence/information: applications that use mobile technology to deliver or retrieve market information including prices.
- Trading facilities
- Weather information
- Peer to peer learning
- Data collection
- Financial services- payments
- Financial services- loans
- Financial services- insurance
- Learning/ advisory/ extension services: applications that use mobile technology to deliver or retrieve agricultural/agronomy information and advice.
- Geospatial applications: Applications enabling data and information related to geography and space to be managed, processed, and visualized. They contribute to land and water use planning, natural resources utilization, agricultural input supply and commodity marketing, poverty and hunger mapping, etc.
- Embedded ICT in farm equipment & processes: Applications that enable greater efficiencies in farm equipment and agricultural processes, and traceability in agricultural products’ transport and marketing through mobile technologies such as RFID, wireless Internet, and cellular telephony for labelling, traceability and identity preservation
  - Operations monitoring, quality control, and product tracking
  - Logistics and business processes
- Agricultural news: applications that provide news on agriculture-related subjects
