= Fabbriche di Vergemoli =

- Comune
- Comune di Fabbriche di Vergemoli
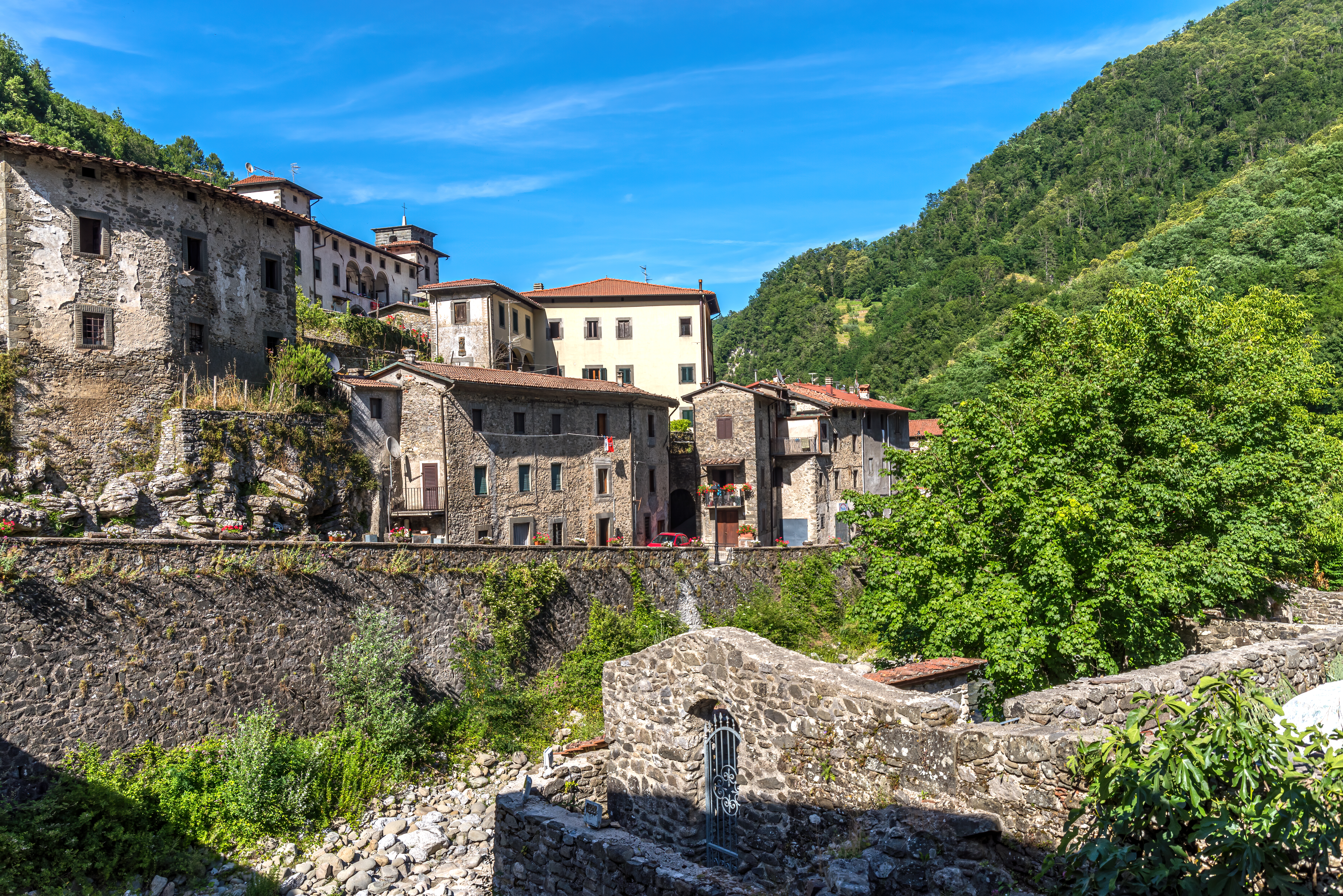
- Vergemoli

- Location within Italy Location within Tuscany
- Coordinates: 43°59′55″N 10°25′44″E
- Country: Italy
- Region: Tuscany
- Province: Lucca (LU)

Government
  - Mayor: Michele Giannini

Area
  - Total: 42.55 km^{2} (16.43 sq mi)
- Elevation: 349 m (1,145 ft)

Population (31 July 2017)
  - Total: 798
  - Density: 18.8/km^{2} (48.6/sq mi)
- Time zone: UTC+1 (CET)
  - Summer (DST): UTC+2 (CEST)
- Postal code: 55021
- Dialing code: 0583
- Patron saint: St. James
- Website: Official website

Fabbriche di Vergemoli is a comune (municipality) in the Province of Lucca in the Italian region of Tuscany. It was created on 1 January 2014 from the merger of Fabbriche di Vallico and Vergemoli.

== See also ==
- San Pellegrinetto (former comune now integrated into Fabbriche di Vergemoli).
