= Domenico Magri =

Italian scholar and humanist

Joannes Domenico Magri
- Born: March 28, 1604; Valletta, Malta
- Died: March 4, 1672 (aged 67); Viterbo, Lazio region, Italy
- Resting place: Viterbo Cathedral
- Parents: Luigi Magri (father); Susanna née Casauro (mother)

Joannes Domenico Magri (Valletta, 28 March 1604 – Viterbo, 4 March 1672) (nom-de-plume Nicodemo Grima) was an Italian Roman Catholic priest and scholar. He was active in various roles in service of the Catholic church, including ambassadorial roles, professorial roles, parish priest, Protonotary Apostolic and secretary of the Congregation for the Propagation of Faith. He wrote a scholarly volume on ecclesiastical terms, which was well received in his time; however, today he is perhaps best known for his short book on the Virtues of Coffee published in 1671.

== Early life and ordination ==
Magri was born in Valletta to Luigi Magri and Susanna née Casauro, originating from Italy. He received his tonsure and the first four minor orders in September 1620 at Monte Cagliaresio (a country estate of Bishop Cagliares near Mdina). At 16, he was ordained by the bishop. He then proceeded to study law in Palermo under his maternal uncle, Professor Luigi Casauro, before continuing his education in Rome.

Magri was inducted as a priest in Malta as a 16 year old. In 1628 he was living at the Collegio Romano where he studied philosophy and theology. He moved back to Malta in 1640 and joined the community of Collegium Melitense. Between 1641 and 1642 Magri was preaching as a priest both in Maltese and Arabic.

He returned to Malta in 1648, but appears to have been involved in a dispute regarding his appointment as parish priest of Vittoriosa by Bishop Balaguer. By 1651 he had lost that appointment, although in 1648, he had been appointed parish priest of St Paul's parish in Valletta. Magri then left Malta for Rome in 1651, where he was named to various posts, including Catechumens’ College, Consultor of the Congregation of the Index of Prohibited Books, and Secretary of the Congregation for the Propagation of Faith.

Magri was knighted into papal Order of the Golden Spur and appointed protonotary apostolic. He was in the service of Cardinal Francesco Maria Brancaccio, Bishop of Viterbo, where he was appointed canon theologian of his cathedral chapter. Magri would die in Viterbo.

== Diplomatic mission ==
At the age of 19, Domenico Magri was chosen to accompany Cardinal Orsini and others, for a critical diplomatic mission to Syria, intended to recruit students for the Pontifical Maronite College, recently founded by Pope Gregory XIII. The Maronites, is an Eastern Christian community in communion with Rome. Magri's selection for this task likely stemmed from his fluency in Semitic languages—a skill that enabled direct communication with Levantine clergy and deepened his understanding of local customs.

Notably, he returned to Rome with twelve Maronite students, who enrolled at the College of the Propaganda Fide—a gesture symbolising renewed collaboration between the communities.

== Literary Works ==
Magri's most enduring legacy lies in his pioneering lexicographical and theological writings. His Notitia de’ Vocaboli Ecclesiastici (1644), an Italian-language encyclopedia of ecclesiastical terms, revolutionised religious lexicography by bridging Latin scholarship with vernacular accessibility. Structured around Latin lemmas paired with detailed Italian explanations, the work blended definitions with historical context, regional rituals (e.g., Maltese practices like coccia, a seasoned wheat dish), and personal observations. Magri expanded it significantly across editions, growing from 909 entries in 1644 to 1,379 by 1650. Unlike the literary focus of the Accademia della Crusca's Vocabolario, Magri emphasised specialised religious terminology—such as Abside (apse), Catacombe (catacombs), and Catechismo (catechism)—filling a gap in Italian lexicography. The Notitia became a Baroque-era bestseller, reprinted nine times by 1751.

A noteworthy facet of his literary activity is his use of the anagrammatic pseudonym "Nicodemo Grima," under which he published works such as the Dichiaratione litterale degl' hinni sacri: secondo la corettione di Vrbano VIII (c. 1658), which is a scholarly tool and a document of a specific historical moment in Catholic liturgy.

After Magri's death, his brother Carlo Magri, a priest and librarian, posthumously translated and expanded the work into Latin as the Hierolexicon (1677). This edition, targeting a pan-European audience, ballooned to over 8,000 entries and saw ten printings, including three in Germany. It underscored the Catholic Church's linguistic influence during the post-Tridentine era and cemented Magri's role in shaping ecclesiastical scholarship.

Beyond lexicography, Magri authored Virtù del Kafé (1671), an 18-page treatise extolling coffee's health benefits. The work is regarded as one of Italy's earliest popular studies on coffee and a landmark in European culinary literature. It was dedicated to his patron Cardinal Brancaccio (1592–1675), who had published a treatise on the beverage chocolate.

His journey to Mount Lebanon, the heart of Maronite ecclesiastical authority, resulted in the Breve racconto del viaggio al Monte Libano (Brief Account of the Journey to Mount Lebanon), published in 1655. A second edition was published in Viterbo in 1664. Magri was, at the time of publication, professor of theology and linguistics in Rome. The work blends travelogue with ethnographic observation, detailing Maronite liturgical practices, regional traditions, and the socio-political landscape of Ottoman Syria.

Though overlooked in 20th-century linguistic histories due to his Latin-centric approach, modern scholars now recognise Magri's contributions to documenting religious vernacular and bridging Maltese, Sicilian, and Tuscan linguistic traditions. His works remain critical to understanding the interplay of language, faith, and culture in early modern Europe.

== Death and legacy ==
Domenico Magri died on 4 March 1672 in Viterbo, his remains are interred in the Viterbo Cathedral. His legacy is that of a polymath whose diverse works contributed to Catholic scholarship, linguistic history, and cultural exchange during the Baroque period. Today, he is also noted for his early treatise on coffee, which reflects the period's growing engagement with global commodities.

== Bibliography ==
- Epistolæ, Coniecturæ, & Obseruationes Sacra, Profanaque Eruditione Ornatæ. Ex Bibliotheca Cathedralis Vterbienses a Dominico Magro Melitensi eiusdem ecclesiæ Canonico Theologo. Studio, ac triennali labore collectæ, prodeunt in lucem publicæ studiforum utilitati ... D. Francicu Mariæ cardinalis Brancacchi. (Part 1). Rome, Nicolai Angeli Tinassi, 1659, 396 p.. A second part was published in Wittemberg 1667.
- Virtu del kafe, bevanda introdotta nuovamente nell'Italia con alcune osservationi per conservar la sanita nella vecchiaia. All'eminentissimo signor cardinal Brancacci, Domenico Magri per Michele Hercole, 1671, 16 pages. (translates as Virtues of coffee, a drink reintroduced into Italy with some observations to preserve health in old age.)
