= Fabbriche di Vallico =

Commune in Tuscany, Italy

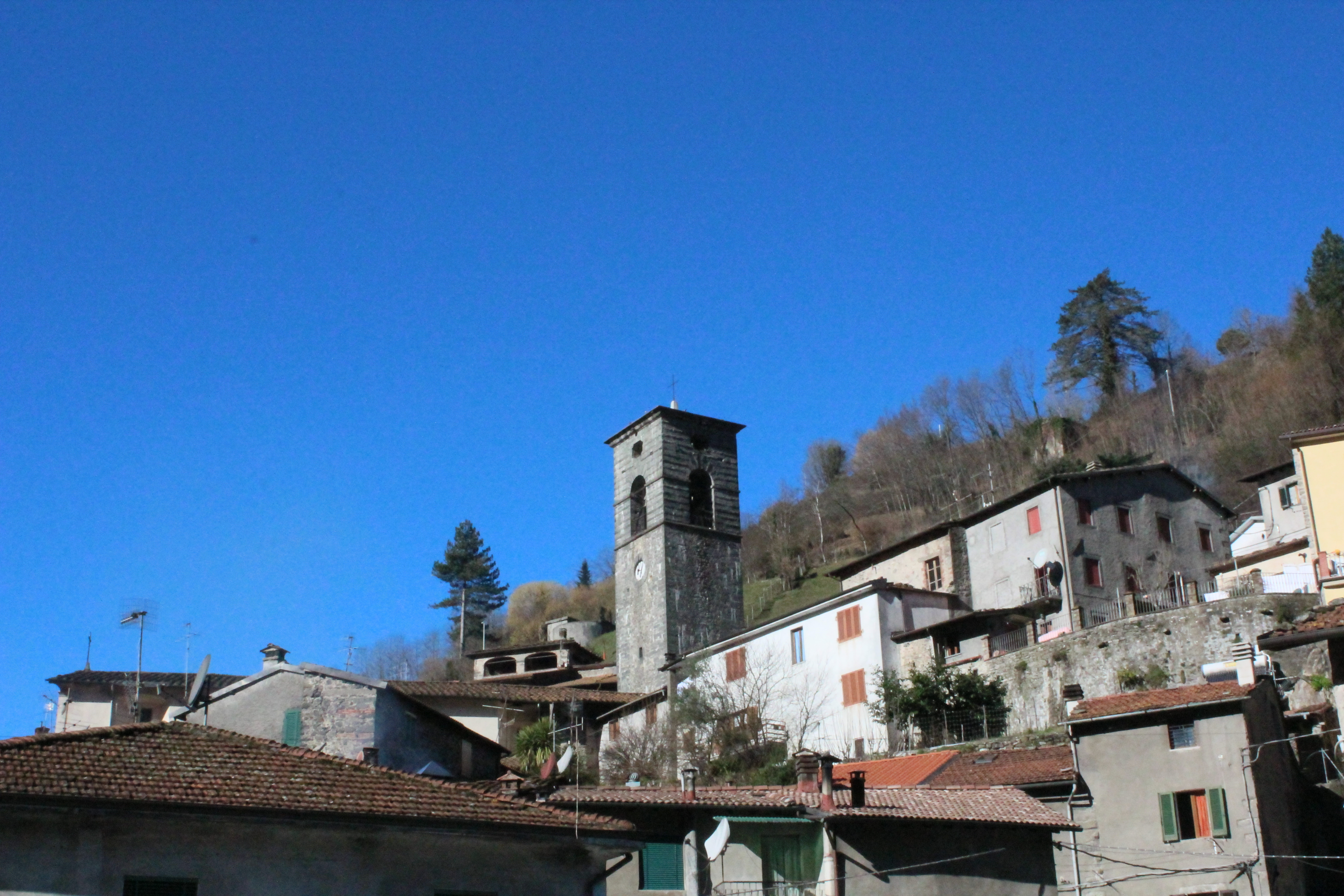
Fabbriche di Vallico, panorama con campanile di San Giacomo

Fabbriche di Vallico was a comune (municipality) in the Province of Lucca in the Italian region Tuscany, located about 70 kilometres (43 mi) northwest of Florence and about 20 kilometres (12 mi) northwest of Lucca. On 1 January 2014 it was merged with Vergemoli in the new comune of Fabbriche di Vergemoli.

The main village of the comune, Fabbriche, was founded by ironworkers from Bergamo in the 14th century. The lesser villages of Vallico di Sopra and Vallico di Sotto are centuries older with surviving records going back to the eighth century. Originally called Vallivo or Vallibo, Vallico di Sopra (Upper Vallico) was the primary settlement but Vallico di Sotto (Lower Vallico) appeared in the 11th century.

By the 19th century Fabbriche had attracted families from Vallico and from neighbouring parts of the Versilia mountains, the Middle Serchio valley and the Modenese Apennines. The population has steadily decreased since the late 19th century and is only about one quarter of what it was at that time.

At the dawn of the 21st Century, there were still water wheels in Fabbriche di Vallico from the 10th Century.
